= Muckhart =

Two villages in Clackmannanshire, Scotland

Coordinates: 56.18841°N 3.61125°W

Muckhart: Scottish Gaelic: Muc-Àird
- Location within Clackmannanshire
- Population: 2,877 (Dollar area including Muckhart)
- OS grid reference: NO001007
- Council area: Clackmannanshire
- Lieutenancy area: Clackmannanshire
- Country: Scotland
- Sovereign state: United Kingdom
- Post town: Dollar
- Postcode district: FK14
- Dialling code: 01259
- Police: Scotland
- Fire: Scottish
- Ambulance: Scottish
- UK Parliament: Dunfermline and Dollar
- Scottish Parliament: Clackmannanshire and Dunblane

Muckhart (Scottish Gaelic: Muc-Àird) commonly refers to two small villages in Clackmannanshire, Scotland, Pool of Muckhart (Scottish Gaelic: Poll Mhuc-Àird) and Yetts o' Muckhart. Muckhart is one of the Hillfoots Villages, situated on the A91 around 3 miles (5 kilometres) northeast of Dollar. The Gaelic name, Muc-àird, comes from muc ("pig") + àird ("height"), and may derive from the fact that the surrounding fields may once have been used for pig farming.

Previously Muckhart, together with Glendevon, formed the southernmost tip of Perthshire. It was transferred to Clackmannanshire in a reorganisation of boundaries in 1971.

The parish boundary is somewhat eccentric and extends to the outer edge of Dollar, some three miles (five kilometres) west. Due to this fact, the primary school is somewhat oddly located (the 1876 Act required the school to be at the centre of the parish) and lies over 1/2 mile (800 metres) west of the outer edge of the main village. It is also some considerable distance from the main road. This can be explained in that it lies on the old coach road to Dollar. This is now just a dirt track to the school (locally known as the Cinder Path). West of the school the old coach route is very hard to follow.

The famed, historic Rumbling Bridge across Rumbling Bridge Gorge of the River Devon in Kinrosshire is about 300 metres (1,000 feet) south of the Muckhart Golf Course on the A823.

== Pool of Muckhart ==
The Inn at Muckhart

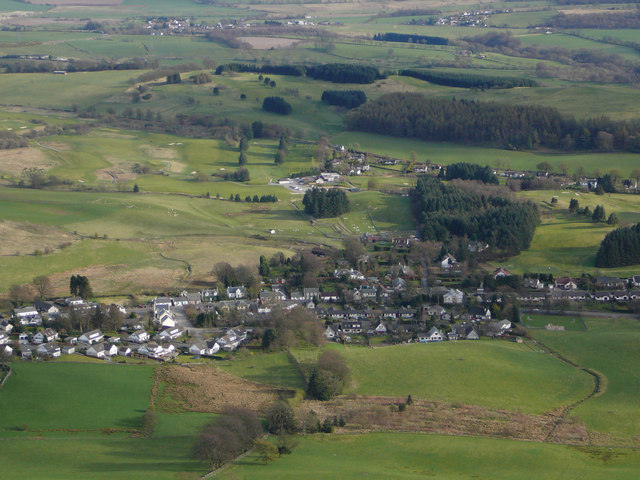
Pool of Muckhart viewed from the top of Seamab (439 m or 1,440 ft), northwest of Muckhart

Pool of Muckhart (Scottish Gaelic: Poll Mhuc-àird) lies slightly east of the centre of the parish of Muckhart (see above). Pool of Muckhart lies in the strath of the River Devon, near the entrance to Glen Devon.

The village lies at the eastern end of the "Hillfoot towns" which skirt the southern edge of the Ochil Hills. The last in the range, standing as a backdrop to the village to its north side is "Seamab".

Of note in the village is the Muckhart Inn, an early 18th-century coaching inn, lying at the point where the old coach road and modern road unite. Whilst the building was always low, this effect has been emphasised due to the raising of the road level (normal when ancient routes were macadamed in the early 19th century).

The main mansion in the parish is Ballilisk, which lies north of the A91 between the Pool and the Yetts. In pre-Reformation times it served as a rectory to the adjacent chapel. It was birthplace and home of Bishop Paton in the 16th century. It was replaced by a new manse (to its west) around 1750 and then went into secular use. Rebuilt around 1800 it was home to the Izatt family for almost two centuries.

The war memorial, on the western edge of the village by the main road, is by local sculptor George Henry Paulin, son of Muckhart's then minister, Rev George Paulin.

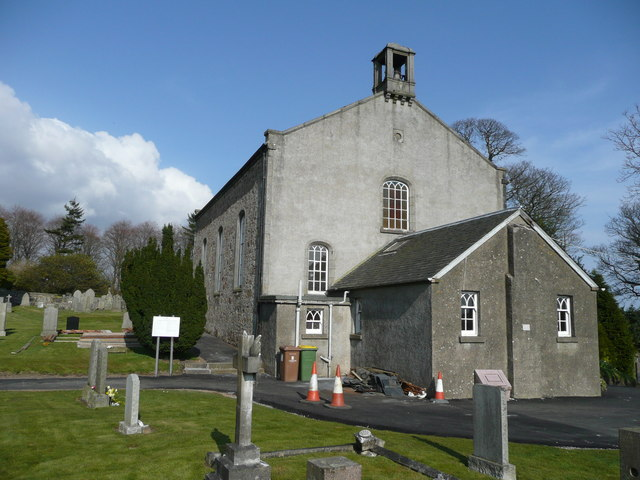
Muckhart Parish Church

A church in Muckhart is mentioned as early as 1470, when its "rector" is listed as John Andrew under the Diocese of St Andrews Cathedral. The final pre-Reformation priest seems to have survived without replacement, John Sempill being in place from 1555 to 1565, being then replaced by James Paton of Ballilisk who later went on to be Bishop of Dunkeld. Henry (Harry) Colville took over from Paton in 1579 and was the first person termed "minister". Colville stayed less than a year before being translated to Orphir in Orkney.

Rev Robert Sharp served 1677 until 1697 and is noteworthy for having had his property robbed in 1679 and for being removed from his position in 1697 for "contumacy" (disobedience). He was succeeded by Rev John Gib (father of Adam Gib). Andrew Ure served 1703 to 1717 before translating to Fossoway. In 1734 Rev Archibald Rennie of Easter Ballilisk began a very controversial tenure during which he rarely appeared. He died in 1786 and was replaced by Rev Andrew Gibson who served until 1830. Rev James Thomson served the Church of Scotland 1832 to 1843 then served the Free Church of Scotland from 1843 to 1863. From 1843 to 1864 the Free Church was located at Shelterhall, midway between Muckhart and Dollar (possibly in a timber building) before moving to a permanent structure in Dollar.

The post Disruption church was served by Rev Alexander Moorhead 1843 to 1869 and was replaced by Rev George Paulin. He was replaced by Rev John Edgar Cairns of County Mayo in 1907.

The ruins of the pro-Reformation church lie to the north-east of the current church. The Post-Reformation church was run by the Presbytery of Auchterarder until 1856.

The current parish church dates from the 18th century but is a plain Scots box chapel in style. In the churchyard is the family monument to the Christies of Cowden (a large estate 1 mi or 1.5 km west, see below).

The Japanese garden at Cowden, part of the Cowden Castle estate, was designed in 1908 by Japanese horticulturalist Taki Handa at the instigation of Ella Christie. The garden was abandoned in the early 1960s but reopened after renovation in 2019. Its Japanese gardener from 1923–1937, Shinzaburo Matsuo, is buried in Muckhart Churchyard.

== Muckhart Golf Club ==
Muckhart Golf Club lies on the School Road (Drumbum Road) south of the village. Set on a series of low rocky hills it includes several challenging holes. There are three nine-hole courses, named Arndean, Cowden, and Naemoor. The nine-hole Cowden course was opened by Miss Ella Christie, who provided 55 acres (22 hectares) of land, on 28 May 1908. The course fell into disrepair during World War II, when it was used for the grazing of sheep. The course was restored after the war. A second nine-hole course, the Ardean course was added in the late 1960s on land leased from Colonel (later Sir) Robert Christie Stewart, then Lord-Lieutenant of the county. A third nine-hole course named Naemoor was opened on 25 July 1998.

== Yetts o' Muckhart ==
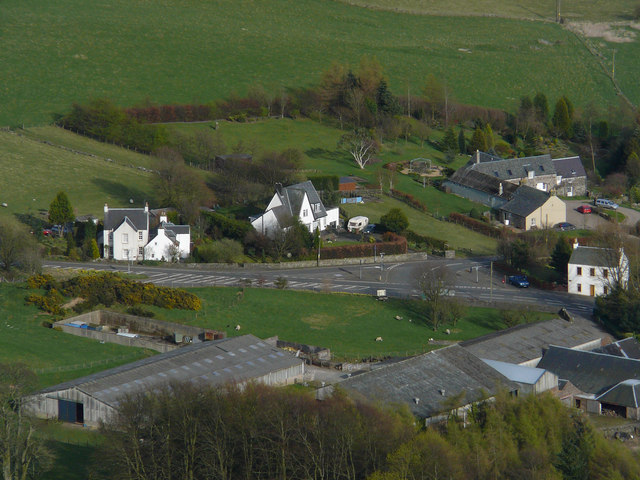
Yetts o Muckhart

This hamlet lies around 1/4 mile (400 metres) further east of Pool of Muckhart. A tollhouse was established here in the early 19th century on a road used by cattle drovers and coaches. Yett is a Scots word for "gate", also used in reference to hill passes.

For various reasons, the name of this hamlet causes some amusement. Its name comes up in several comedy programmes, supposedly used for "comic effect", notably Channel 4's production Absolutely.

== Lees of Muckhart ==
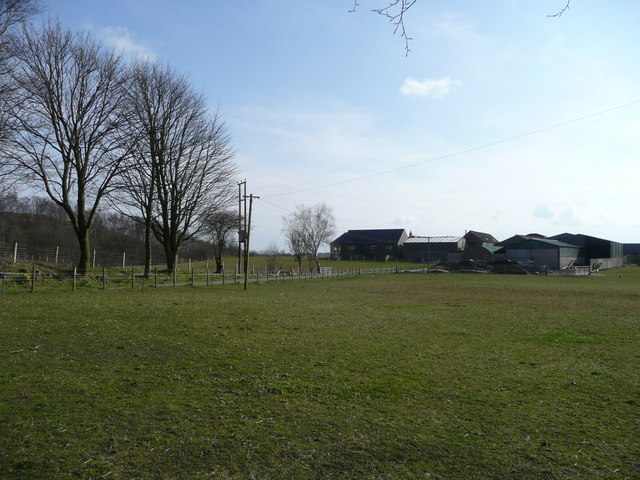
Lees or Leys of Muckhart

Not always recognised as the third and final part of the village group, this area is now in single use as a farm. It lies just west of Muckhart Primary School on the old coach road to Dollar (the southern section of this road is barely discernible).

== Baldiesburn ==
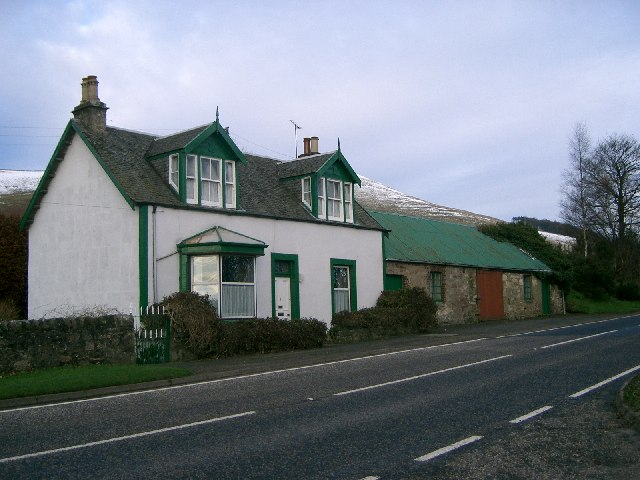
Hillcrest at Baldiesburn

Somewhat depleted in size, this small hamlet on the main road west of the Pool of Muckhart now has only two houses. It has lost several buildings but was previously a small industrial centre. Of interest, the sheds still attaching the eastern building were built as a blacksmith's c. 1700. The building to the west was a carpenter's, but most of its sheds are now gone. The buildings on the south side of the road were removed when the main road was straightened c.1970. Also obliterated by this roadworks, the village curling pond stood some 1/4 mile (400 metres) further west.

== Cowden estate ==
=== Early history ===
The Cowden estate lies just to the south of the higher ground known as the Ochil Hills, on the main road (A91) just over 1 mile (1.5 kilometres) west of the Pool of Muckhart. The estate formerly focussed around Cowden Castle, a traditional Scottish stone-built castle of various dates, originating around 1500. This was demolished in 1950. Some of the early outbuildings, such as the sawmill range and bell-tower from the 17th century, still survive.

Archbishop Lambert built a house named "Castleton" on the property in 1320. The Bruces of Clackmannanshire owned the estate from 1758.

=== John Christie era ===
John Christie FRSE (b. 4 July 1822, d. 19 August 1902) was the only son of Alexander Christie (born 1789, died 1859) and Isabella Robertson (b. about 1792) of Struan and the nephew of Mrs Isabella Christie (Hill). Alexander Christie was laird of Milnwood in Lanarkshire, where he operated three coal mines, . and possessed of a considerable fortune from industry, which descended to John Christie. In addition, John Christie had two collieries in Edinburghshire.

John Christie purchased Cowden (then known as Castleton), which contained about 524 acres (212 hectares), in 1865. Mrs. Bruce sold the Cowden estate, a property of about 524 acres (212 hectares), which contained a large three-storey, rambling, sandstone house, to Mr. John Christie in 1866 who renamed the property "Cowden Castle". Traditionally the estate focused upon woodland management and the raising of deer and pheasants. Cowden Castle became the seat of the Christie family. Mr. Christie later had a coat-of-arms created and placed over the entrance door. John Christie was reported to own 616 acres (249 hectares) in 1873.

Mr. Christie collected a wide variety of artefacts during his many trips to the European continent. He filled Cowden Castle with many unrelated objects, which resulted in a very eclectic style.

John married Alison Philp (b. about 1817), daughter of Alison Coldwells and William Philp, of Stobsmills, Midlothian (the home of her uncle John Coldwells) on 27 April 1859. John and Alison Philp Christie had three children. The first, a boy, John Coldwells Christie, (born 1860) died before he was twelve. Isabella (Ella) Robertson Christie was born 21 April 1861 at Millbank, Cockpen, Edinburgh (John Christie's home near Edinburgh). The third-born child was Alice Margaret Christie (b. about 1863). The girls' mother, Alison Philp Christie, was in poor health and Isabella Thornburn, an elderly woman, was their nurse. Later Miss Townsend served as the governess of the two teenage girls. John Christie believed that travel was the best education for girls so he took the girls on many trips to Europe. Ella was taken to Paris at the age of twelve.

Alice Christie married Robert King Stewart, KBE, of Murdostoun in 1881, when she was seventeen and left to live at Murdostoun Castle in Lanarkshire. After Alice married, only Ella accompanied her father on trips.

Mr Christie had an attack of pernicious anæmia about 1887. Although he recovered his health, his illness caused him to become difficult, secretive, and eccentric for the remainder of his life.

In 1893 the castle was extended by the prodigious Glasgow architects Honeyman and Keppie, probably at the request of Ella, given her father's health.

Mr Christie founded Christie Homes (later Lothian Homes Trust) in 1889, a charity which opened several orphanages for girls in and around East Lothian. A Christie Home was opened at Portobello in 1892. Tenterfield, in Haddington, was opened in 1898. Mr Christie caused an orphanage to be created at Catlaw Head. He concealed his support of orphanages from his family.

Mrs Christie, who was a bit older than her husband, died in 1894 at the age of about 76. Mr Christie refused to purchase a casket for his wife's burial, so Ella had to use her funds to purchase a casket for her mother.

As Mr Christie's illness progressed he became increasing secretive and paranoid. In 1895, medical doctors advised Mr. Christie to take a trip to Egypt for health reasons. His daughter, Ella, as caretaker to her father, accompanied him on his trip. While in Egypt he suddenly decided to return home and abandoned his daughter in Egypt. When in his late seventies, Mr. Christie dyed his moustache and proposed marriage to a woman fifty years younger.

Ella Christie found Mr. Christie dead at the age of 80 years in his townhouse at 19 Buckingham Terrace, Edinburgh on 19 August 1902. At the time of his death, he owned estates at Milnwood in Lanarkshire, Arndean now in Perth and Kinross, Glenfarg and Easterton in Perthshire, and Carnbo in the county of Kinross, in addition to his estate at Cowden.

=== Ella Christie era ===
The morning after John Christie died, a stranger arrived at 19 Buckingham Terrace and informed Miss Christie that her father had executed a will that left all his property to his orphanages and she and her sister were to get nothing. Miss Christie would have been homeless and penniless, however, Lady Stewart would have her husband on whom she could depend.

Miss Christie resolved to contest the will. She was told by solicitors that the "dead hand would prevail", however, she eventually located a firm which would take her case.

Miss Christie ordered a stained glass window erected in honour of her father removed from Muckhart Church and she moved to 19 Buckingham Terrace for the duration of the trial.

The trial was held in the Law Courts in Parliament Square in July 1903. Dr T. S. Clouston, president of the college of physicians and an expert in diseases of the brain, introduced medical evidence from the British Medical Journal and gave his expert opinion that pernicious anæmia adversely affected the brain. Several witnesses provided an abundance of testimony regarding Mr. Christie's bizarre behaviour in the years after his illness and the unfairness of the will. All of the evidence supported the conclusion that Mr. Christie was not of sound mind at the time of his execution of his will.

This evidence put the defendants in a state of despair and persuaded them to agree to an out-of-court compromise settlement in which the Christie daughters received the bulk of the estate, while the orphanages received a sum sufficient for their needs. The press gave a value of £250,000 as the value of the estate – a vast sum in the years before the currency inflation of World War I.

Miss Isabella (Ella) Robertson Christie (born 1861, died 1949), daughter of John (born 1822, died 1902) and Alison Philp Christie (died 1894), famed for her foreign travels and accounts thereof., succeeded her father as laird of the Cowden Castle estate. She then preferred to be known as "Miss Christie of Cowden". There were many times when Miss Christie was not in residence because of her extended travels abroad. Miss Christie travelled with a lady's maid and a bearer.

Miss Christie travelled in India, Ceylon, and Tibet in 1904. She arrived first in Bombay, where she was a guest of Lord and Lady Lamington, who provided her with a bungalow at Government House. Miss Christie visited many places, both on and off the beaten path, while in India.

Miss Christie, like other lady travellers, preferred to maintain her independence, by avoiding travelling with a companion. When Miss Christie encountered Miss Jane Ellen Duncan on the plain of Ladakh, they pitched their tents as far apart as possible and agreed to travel on different days so as to avoid travelling together. Nevertheless, Miss Christie and Miss Duncan were friends.

Miss Christie was a skilled photographer with the Kodak camera. She recorded her trips on film. She allowed Miss Duncan to use many of her photographs in her book about her travels.

Miss Christie travelled in China and Japan in 1907.

Cowden Castle received telephone service in 1910.

Miss Christie travelled in Central Asia in 1910 and 1912.

Miss Christie was elected a fellow of the Royal Scottish Geographical Society in 1911. She was elected vice-president of the Society in 1934. She was elected a fellow of the Royal Geographical Society in 1913.

Miss Christie toured America with a side trip to Havana, Cuba in 1914. She sailed on the Carmania in February. While in New York City, she met the Vanderbilts, and lunched with Mrs. Franklin Roosevelt. In Washington, D. C., she toured the White House and Arlington, the former home of Robert E. Lee. In the South, she visited Richmond, Virginia and Charleston, South Carolina before leaving for Havana and Camagüey in Cuba. She then returned to the United States and visited New Orleans before moving on to Baton Rouge, where she was the guest of her second cousin, Miss Katherine Marion Hill (b. 25 December 1856, d. 25 February 1949) at her mansion on Lafayette Street, and met her American cousins, the descendants of John Hill. Moving west, she visited the Grand Canyon, Los Angeles, and Santa Barbara, California, where she met the widow of Robert Louis Stevenson. Starting back to the east, she stopped off at Yellowstone National Park before arriving in Chicago. After Chicago, she stopped at Niagara Falls, and then moved on to Massachusetts, where she visited Plymouth, a community of the Shakers, and the homes and graves of her favourite American authors. After a visit to Yale University, she returned to New York and went up to West Point on 22 June 1914 to attend the graduation of her Louisiana cousin, John Hill Carruth, a cadet who fainted while on parade during her visit. Miss Christie returned home on the Mauretania in June 1914, just in time for the World War.

Miss Christie did her part in the Great War. In 1916, she was offered the Directorship of a canteen in Bar-sur-Aube, France by the French Red Cross Committee, which she accepted. The canteen was called in French, Cantine des Dames Anglaises. She did this for a year and then returned to Cowden. In 1918, she once again went to France to direct a canteen at Mulhouse, Alsace until 1919, when the need for a canteen ended.

Miss Christie published a book about her travels in central Asia, Through Khiva to Golden Samarkand, in 1925.

Miss Christie and her sister, Lady Alice Christie King Stewart, published a reminiscence of their lives entitled A Long Look at Life by Two Victorians in 1940. Miss Christie's sister died at Claghorn House in South Lanarkshire on 5 September of that same year.

Miss Christie died of leucæmia in Edinburgh on 29 January 1949 at the age of 87 years. Funeral services were held at Muckhart Parish Church on Wednesday, 2 February. Miss Christie was the last surviving Christie. She is buried in the family plot, to the east of the church. The estate passed to her great-nephew, Colonel Stewart of Arndean.

==== Miss Christie's Japanese Garden ====
Miss Christie, after her visit to Japan in 1907, caused a Japanese garden, designed by Taki Handa, a student at Doshisha University, Japan who was studying at Studley College, around 1908, to be planted at Cowden on a 7-acre (3-hectare) site, which she named Shah-rak-uenor, meaning place of 'pleasure and delight'. Queen Mary visited the garden in 1932. The garden was maintained by a Japanese man named Matsuo until his death in 1936, after which Miss Christie maintained the garden until her death in 1949. The garden then fell into disrepair and was closed permanently in 1955.

Although the Japanese garden fell into ruin, it supported hundreds of rhododendrons, brought over from the Himalayas to brighten up the estate in the 19th century. In 2013, Christie's great-niece Sara Stewart began restoring the Japanese garden.

=== Recent history ===
Cowden Castle, burned in 1950 and was pulled down in 1952. Much of the valuables from the house survived and were removed to Arndean. Many items of furniture were distributed among the many estate houses. Thereafter the estate was merged into the Arndean Estate, the seat of the Stewart family. (Ardean lies about 1 mi or 1.5 km southwest of the Cowden estate.) Still surviving are Cowden's stables and the east and west lodges (the east lodge is now off the main road due to the straightening). A faded dollar sign painted on a wall near the lodge marks a humorous direction sign to the town of Dollar to the west, but due to the road moving now serves no function.

Of great interest, the estate sawmill buildings still survive amid the woods. These date from the mid 18th century. They had adjacent ponds to float larger logs into the saws to cleverly avoid weight problems. Several modern houses have been built within the estate, many hidden in its wooded grounds.

The Japanese Garden was rebuilt and reopened in 2019. It bears little resemblance to the original garden but is located around the same pond. It is open to the public.

== Muckhart Mill ==
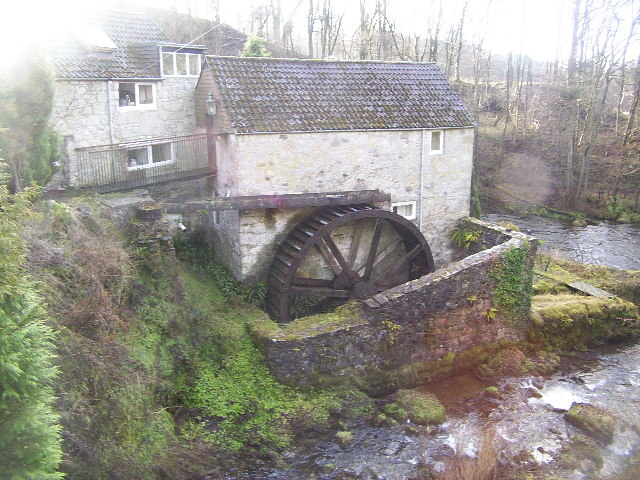
Muckhart Mill

Slightly to the south-west of the Cowden estate, well off the current main road, lies Muckhart Mill at the confluence of Hole Burn, which powered the Mill, and the River Devon. In more recent years this was connected to the Elmhirst family who were directly linked to the Elmhirsts of Dartington Hall, Devon, and to the Haggard family by marriage. Rider Haggard was the author of the infamous novel "She".

Records of Muckhart Mill date back to 16 October 1560 on a deed. as witnessed by "Henry Douglas of Muckhart Mill" for Lady Margaret Douglas of Lochleven (née Lady Margaret Erskine), mistress of King James V of Scotland, widow of Sir Robert Douglas of Lochleven, mother of Sir William Douglas of Lochleven, to whose custody Queen Mary was committed in his castle at Lochleven on 17 June 1567.

Later on, the Douglas family sold the mill to Bishop James Paton text who subsequently passed ownership of the farm to Archibald Campbell, 5th Earl of Argyll in about 1571.

The Mill is category B listed and described as a "complex building of several dates: M.I.M. 1666, 1717, 1727 (internally) 1770 and 19th-century alterations, including ashlar facing of wheel-pit. Comprises three blocks at different angles, all pantiled, disused 20' overshot wheel at N., wooden arms, cast-iron outer frame. Workings and kiln gutted, renovated as children's holiday home 1967."

It is believed to have one of Scotland's largest overshot waterwheels which was renovated into working condition by the current owner several years ago but is no longer in operation. It is even rarer a building as there is evidence of a smaller waterwheel, possibly on the same axle as the main one, but on the other side of the building. There you can find a second water channel running alongside the building which exits under a small bridge and into the River Devon

1666 There is an inscription on the side wall of the Mill house "M.I.M. 1666" as identified by local postie and amateur historian, Alan Ritchie on 6/9/14.

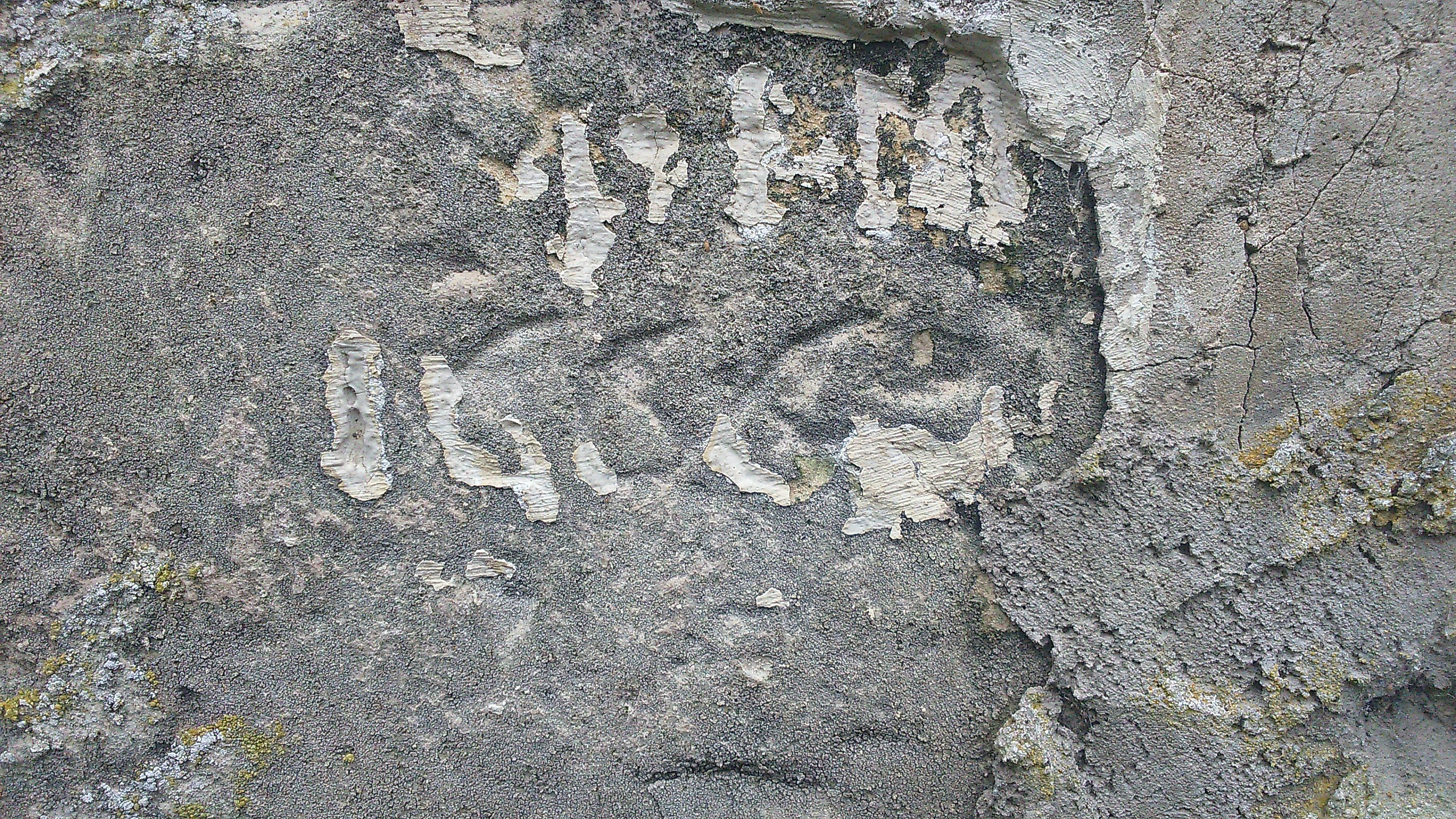
The 1666 date on Muckhart Mill

Masonic Eye A masonic mark is visible downstream of the bridge, facing the bridge.

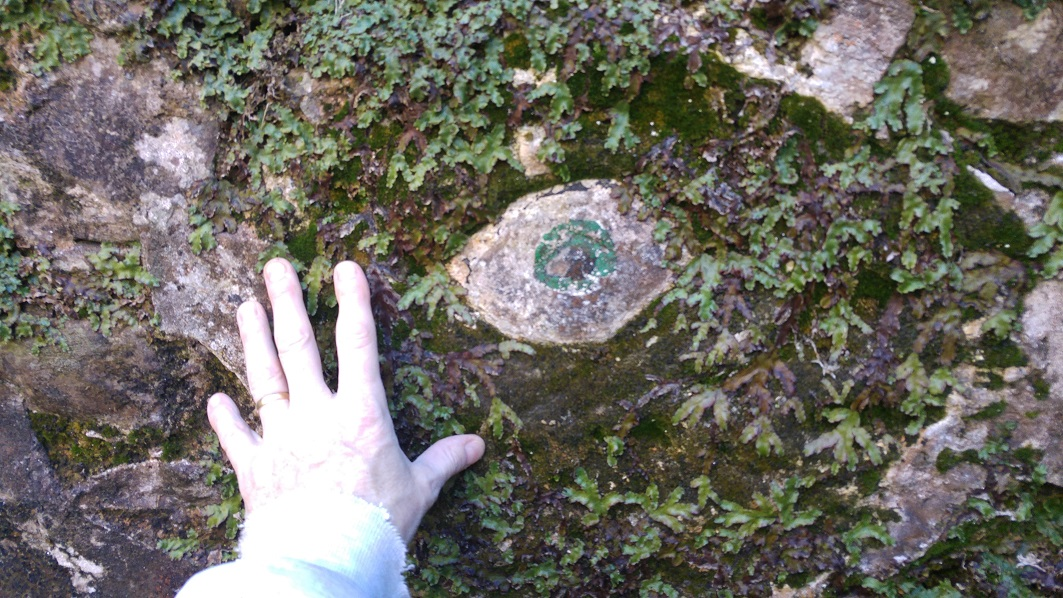
Masonic eye on bridge facing upstream

Mason's markings near one of the windows near the wheel pit

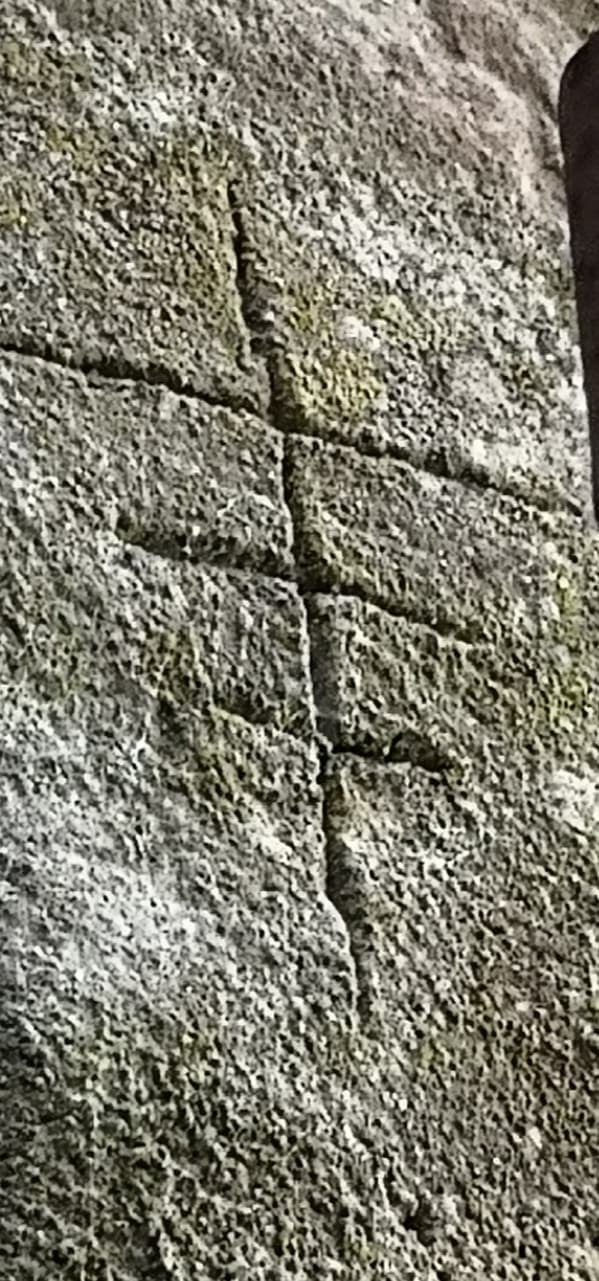

Similar mason's marks (bottom right row) can be found on the records on 22/3/10 at Rosslyn Chapel, when the barrel vaulted ceiling renovated.

These are mentioned in the great BBC documentary "Rosslyn Chapel -A treasure in stone" on youtube (timestamp 38:00).

It is suggested that the son of the mason who worked in Muckhart Mill, worked on the roof renovation at Rosslyn Chapel in 1860-61 by adding the "blind line" possibly by the Carmichael or Brodie families via the architect David Bryce, Grand Architect of the Grand Lodge of Scotland (ref "...19th-century alterations, including ashlar facing of wheel-pit.")

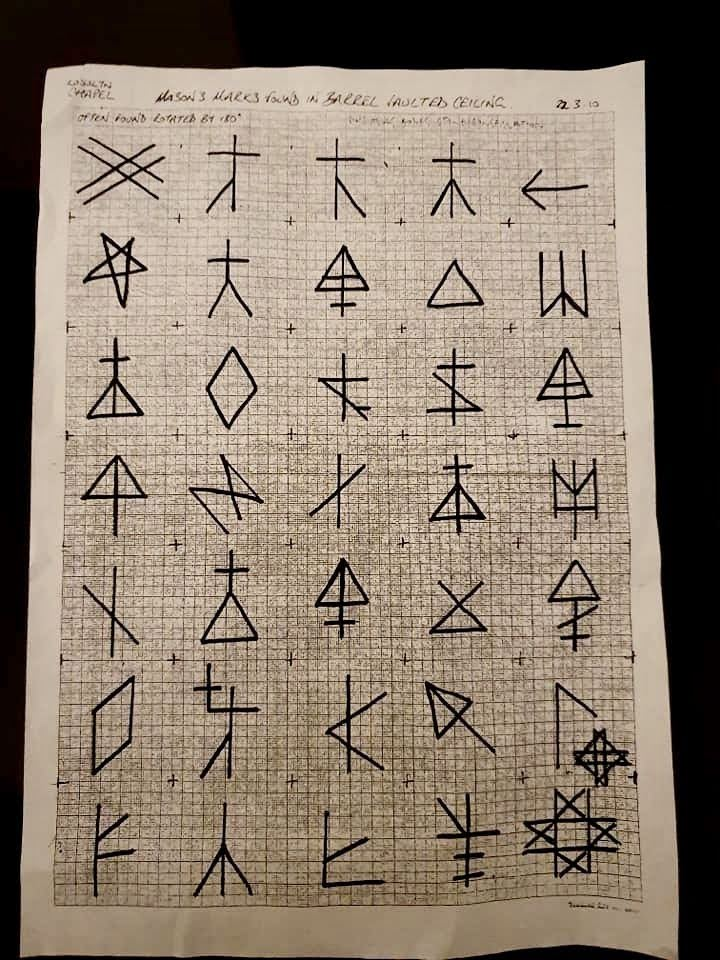
Masonic signs in roof of Rosslyn Chapel

Other photos of the Mill show the wheel without buckets (later restored by Dr Alf Wilde but since rotten away and removed).

Muckhart Mill & Farmhouse showing working cow shed and stone staircase on left for farmhouse (now bedroom and wrought iron staircase) and extended building to the front of Muckhart Mill (since removed).

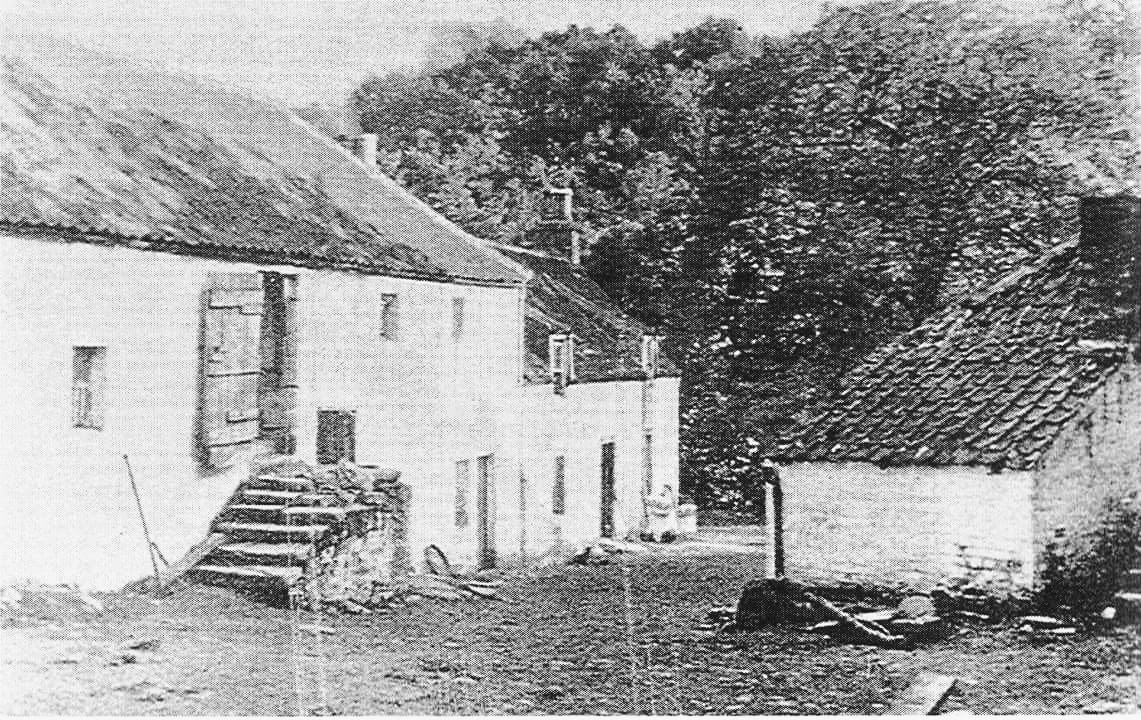
Muckhart Mill

Painting of Muckhart Mill, by George Smith (Scottish artist) in 1914

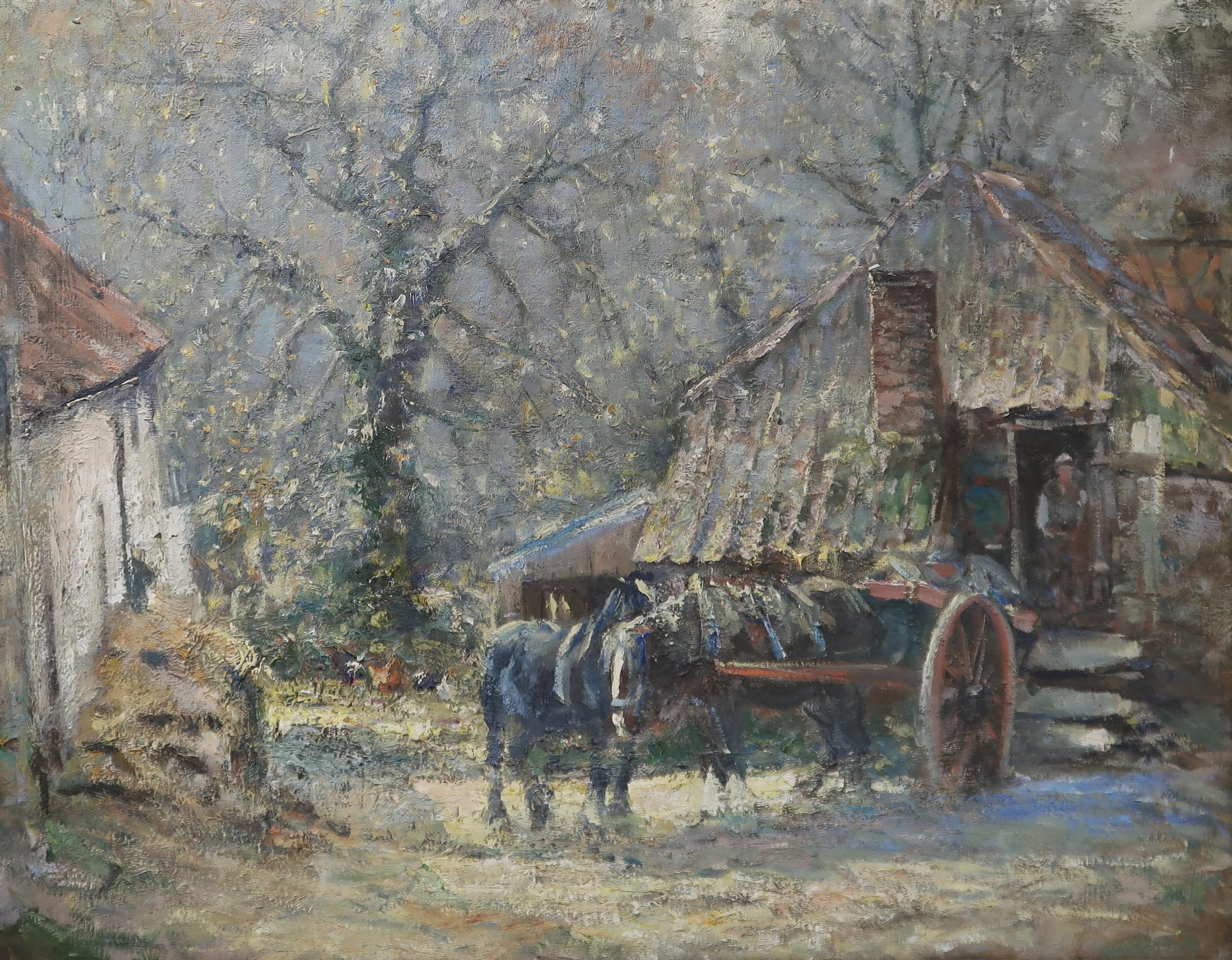
Muckhart Mill by George Smith

=== Elmhirst Era ===
Richard Elmhirst married Morna (nee Gillespie, widow of Stephen Haggard) and had 3 children, Eloise, Francis & Alice with stepsons Piers Haggard and Mark Haggard. Richard & Morna launched the converted Mill buildings as a guest house and children's holiday centre in 1966. Alan Elmhirst married Marion Aitchison and helped his parents manage the home until they died within the year, and Alan died in 1978 at the age of 30 from a tractor accident.

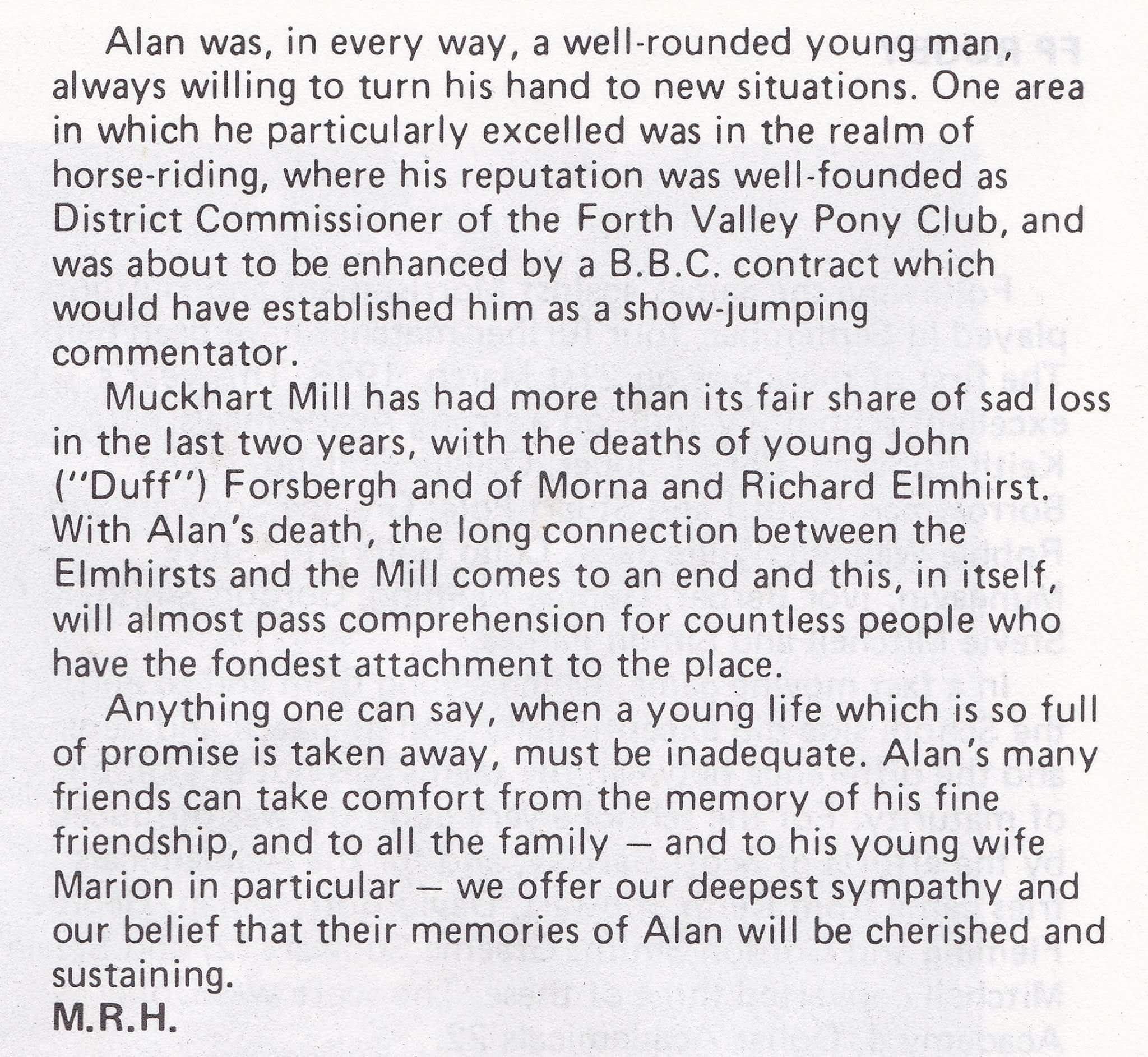

=== Robert Burns ===
It is believed that Robert Burns would have passed by Muckhart Mill on 27 August 1787 while staying at Harvieston as recorded in his diary: "Monday.—Go to Harvieston. Go to see Caudron Linn, and Rumbling Brig, and Deil's Mill Return in the evening."

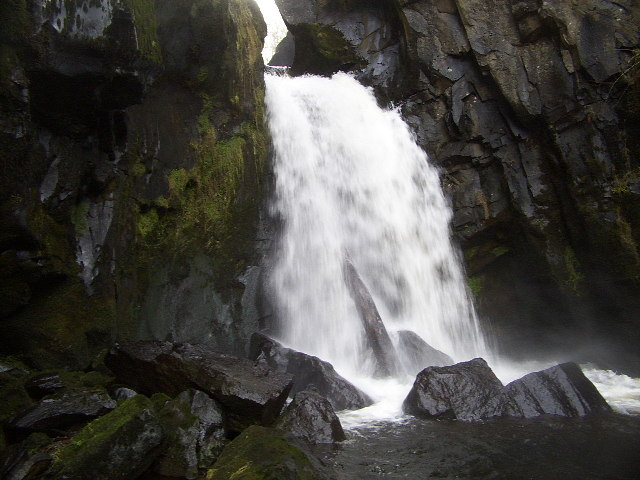
Cauldron Linn

While staying at Harviestoun Burns wrote two poems, "The Banks of the Devon" and "Fairest Maid on Devon Bank". Burns fell for the charm and beauty of Charlotte Hamilton but she was more attracted to Burns' friend, Adair whom she later married.

== Muckhart Mill Farmhouse ==
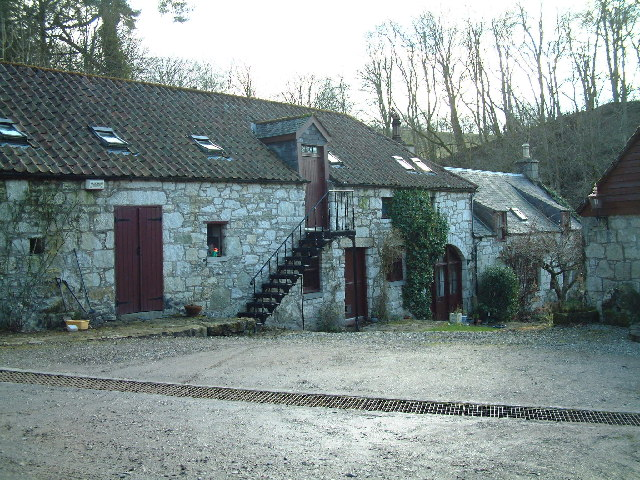
Muckhart Mill Farmhouse

Adjacent to the mill lies Muckhart Mill Farmhouse, a category B listed property described as a house of "single-storey and attic with swept dormers dated (17)80; later wooden porch: steading single-storey, partly with loft, pantiled and white-washed".

Muckhart Mill was a children's holiday home and the owners often get visitors who used to stay here over the summer, riding ponies and swimming in the river.

YouTube has some old film footage from the 1960s of the Forth Valley Pony club and other clips which contain shots of The Mill.

The names of the ponies are still left in chalk above their boxes, Danny, Mr Carter and Pepper.

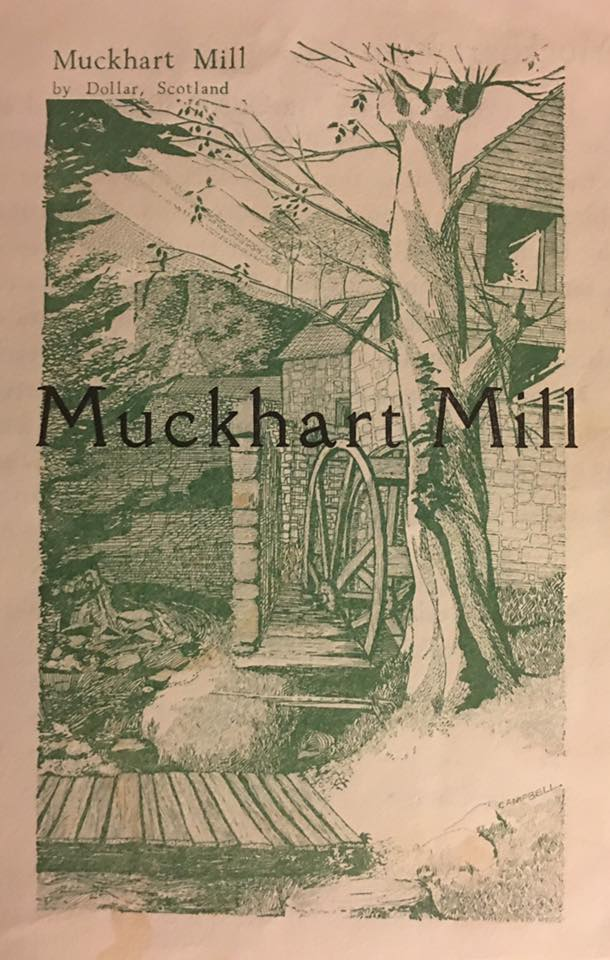
Brochure when MMFH was used as a children's holiday home

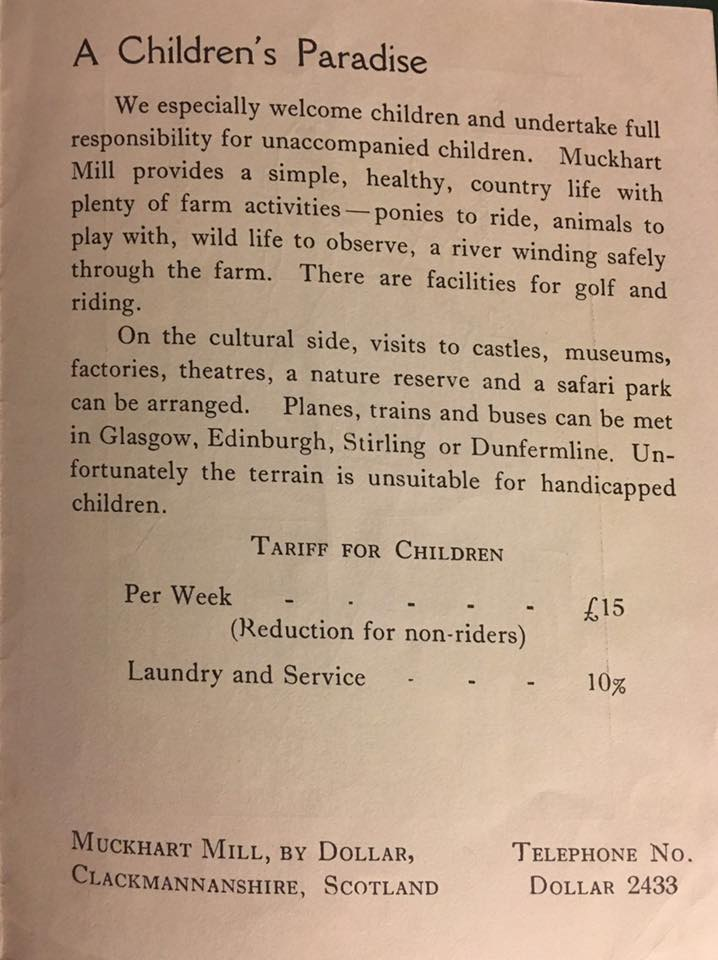
Brochure when MMFH was used as a children's holiday home

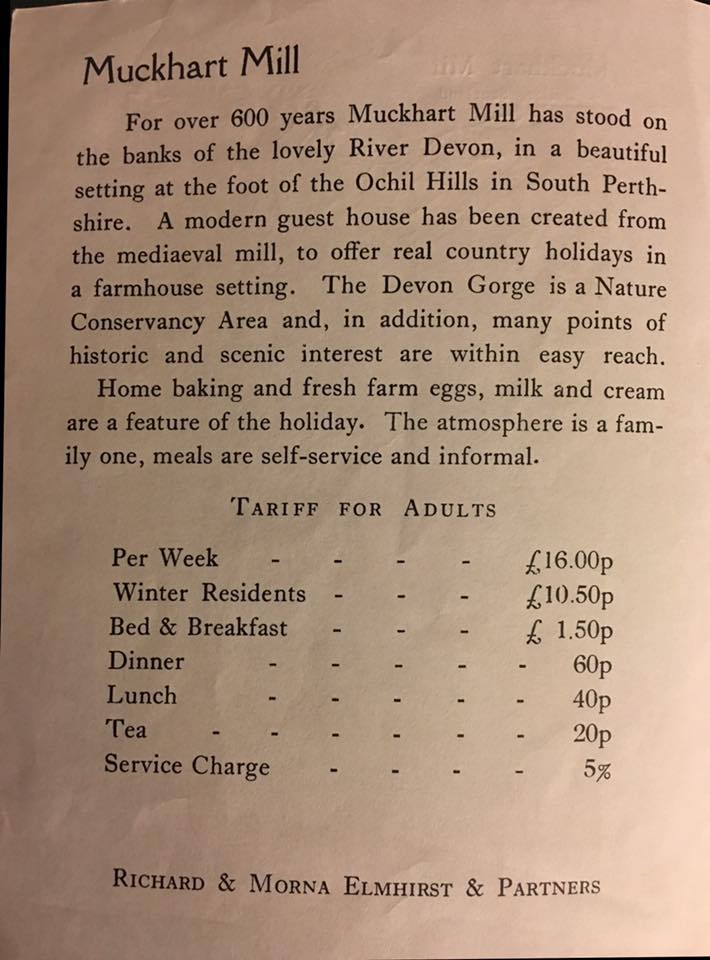
Brochure when MMFH was used as a children's holiday home

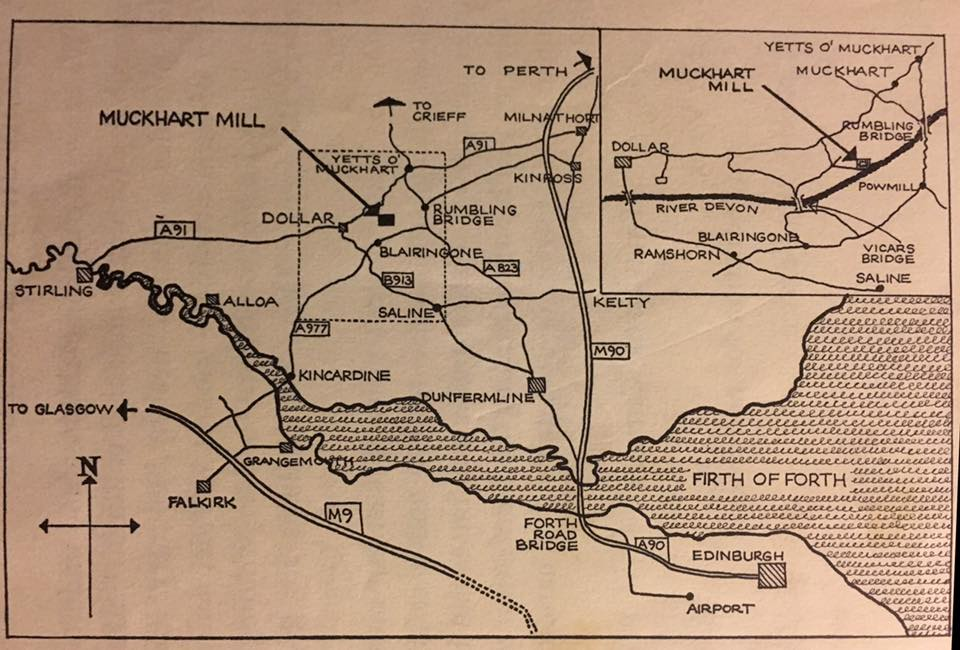
Brochure when MMFH was used as a children's holiday home

=== Muckhart Mill Lime Kiln ===
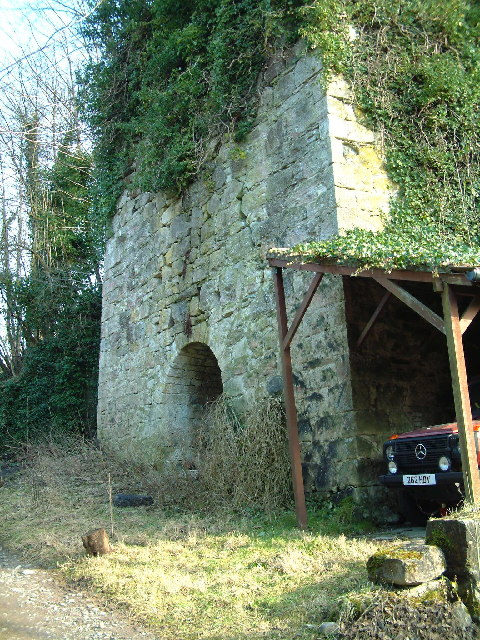
Lime kiln near Muckhart Mill

Further up the farm track lies a category B listed Limekiln. Described as "Mid 19th century. Very large, about 35' high, square plan, stone-built with battered walls, three arched fireholes; operated by the Carron Company." The Carron Company was at the forefront of the Industrial Revolution in the United Kingdom and who built the Carron iron Works in 1759 that Burns attempted to visit on "Sunday, August 26.—Camelon, the ancient metropolis of the Picts, now a small village in the neighbourhood of Falkirk. Cross the Grand Canal to Carron." He attempted to visit the iron works but, being a Sunday, was refused entrance. Both travellers instead withdrew to the Carron Inn opposite. They dined on the second floor of the Inn and Burns later recorded the event briefly in his journal of the tour—Carron-breakfast. However, he also vented his anger, by scoring a few lines of prose on one of the Inn's windows. He used a diamond-tipped stylus which had earlier been presented to him in Edinburgh by James Cunningham, 14th Earl of Glencairn:

At Carron Ironworks
We cam na here to view your warks,
In hopes to be mair wise,
But only, lest we gang to hell,
It may be nae surprise:
But when we tirl'd at your door
Your porter dought na hear us;
Sae may, shou'd we to Hell's yetts come,
Your billy Satan sair us!

The Mill is listed as "Blairbane" in the 1st edition of the OS 6-inch map (Fife and Kinross 1855, sheet xxi

=== Bridge at Muckhart Mill ===
The bridge has a masonic eye painted on the right hand side of the upstream facing part. It is head high, about 6" in width and is clearly visible to this day. It is painted in green.

The bridge is a listed building.

== The Vicar's Bridge murder ==
In the same locale lies Vicar's Bridge. The historic bridge was replaced by a modern structure in the 1960s. Of note here, was a murder in the late 19th century by Joe Bell of a passer-by. A tree known as "Joe Bell's tree" had the letters JB carved on it and allegedly were carved whilst he waited for a victim. This could of course have been added after the event for dramatic purposes. Joe Bell had the unfortunate claim to fame of being the last man publicly hanged in Scotland (in Perth) for shooting a baker

The map on Scotlands People website sites the location of the "Supposed place of murder", "supposed lurking place" and "blood spots". The location is clearly marked not at the bridge but further up the track towards Blairingone.

Utterly destitute, with not a penny in the world to buy a piece of bread, poacher Joseph Bell, 29, borrowed a shotgun and next day turned highwayman, waylaying farmer Alexander McEwan, 40, on his horse and cart at Blairingone in Perthshire. He blasted the farmer to death and then relieved him of his wallet, containing £5 10s.

Bells footprints were found at the scene, and so was the murder weapon. When he was arrested he had exactly £5. 10s. on him. He strongly denied ever having been involved, but was tried at Perth on 24 April and hanged a month later on Tuesday, 22 May 1866, on a gallows brought from Aberdeen and placed outside Perth Prison.

A full account of the trial and execution can be found in an article in The Alloa Advertiser here: Alloa Advertiser: walk past vicars bridge murder

Back on the main road to Dollar the small farm known as Shelterhall was bought in a derelict state by the Longmuir brothers of Bay City Rollers fame in the late 1970s and temporarily became a place of "pilgrimage" for some years during the period of "Rollermania", which was rife at that time. Alan Longmuir owned and ran the "Castle Campbell Hotel" in Dollar to the west.

== Public rights-of-way ==
The Clackmannanshire Council has confirmed the recognition of public rights-of-way in the Muckhart area including the ancient coach road section known as the Cinder Path, linking the village to the primary school.

== Transport ==
Muckhart is situated on the A91. Muckhart has never been served by rail, with the nearest station being Rumbling Bridge. It was served by the 23 Stirling–St Andrews bus route until the withdrawal of that service in 2020; it is now served by the 202 Kinross–Tillicoultry route.

== Notable residents of Muckhart ==
- Dr Grace Cadell (1855–1918), militant suffragette and Scotland's first female surgeon; lived her final years at Mosspark, Yetts of Muckhart
- Isabella (Ella) Robertson Christie (1861–1949), Victorian lady traveller
- John Christie (1822–1902), landowner
- Sholto Johnstone Douglas (1871–1958), artist
- Rev Adam Gib (1714–1788)
- George Alexander Gibson (1854–1913), physician, medical author and amateur geologist, Fellow of the Royal Society of Edinburgh, Chief Physician at Edinburgh Royal Infirmary
- George Henry Paulin (1888–1962), sculptor and artist

== Ministers of Muckhart ==
- James Paton of Ballilisk, later Bishop of Dunkeld, post Reformation until 1580
- Alexander Fotheringhame from 1615 to 1638
- Rev John Govan (1660s)
- Rev James Thomson of Ormiston (1800-1871) minister of the parish from 1832. Left the established church in the Disruption of 1843 and became minister of the Free Church of Dollar and Muckhart (sited in Dollar).
- Rev Alexander M. Ferguson minister from 1843 to 1869.
- Rev George Paulin (1870-1907)

== See also ==
- River Devon, Clackmannanshire
- Rights of way in Scotland
- List of listed buildings in Muckhart, Clackmannanshire
