= X53 (disambiguation) =

X53 may refer to:

- Boeing X-53 Active Aeroelastic Wing
- X53 Stirling–Kinross, a withdrawn bus route
- X53, a Jurassic Coaster route between Weymouth and Axminster
