= Lillias Hamilton =

British medical doctor, writer, educator (1858–1925)

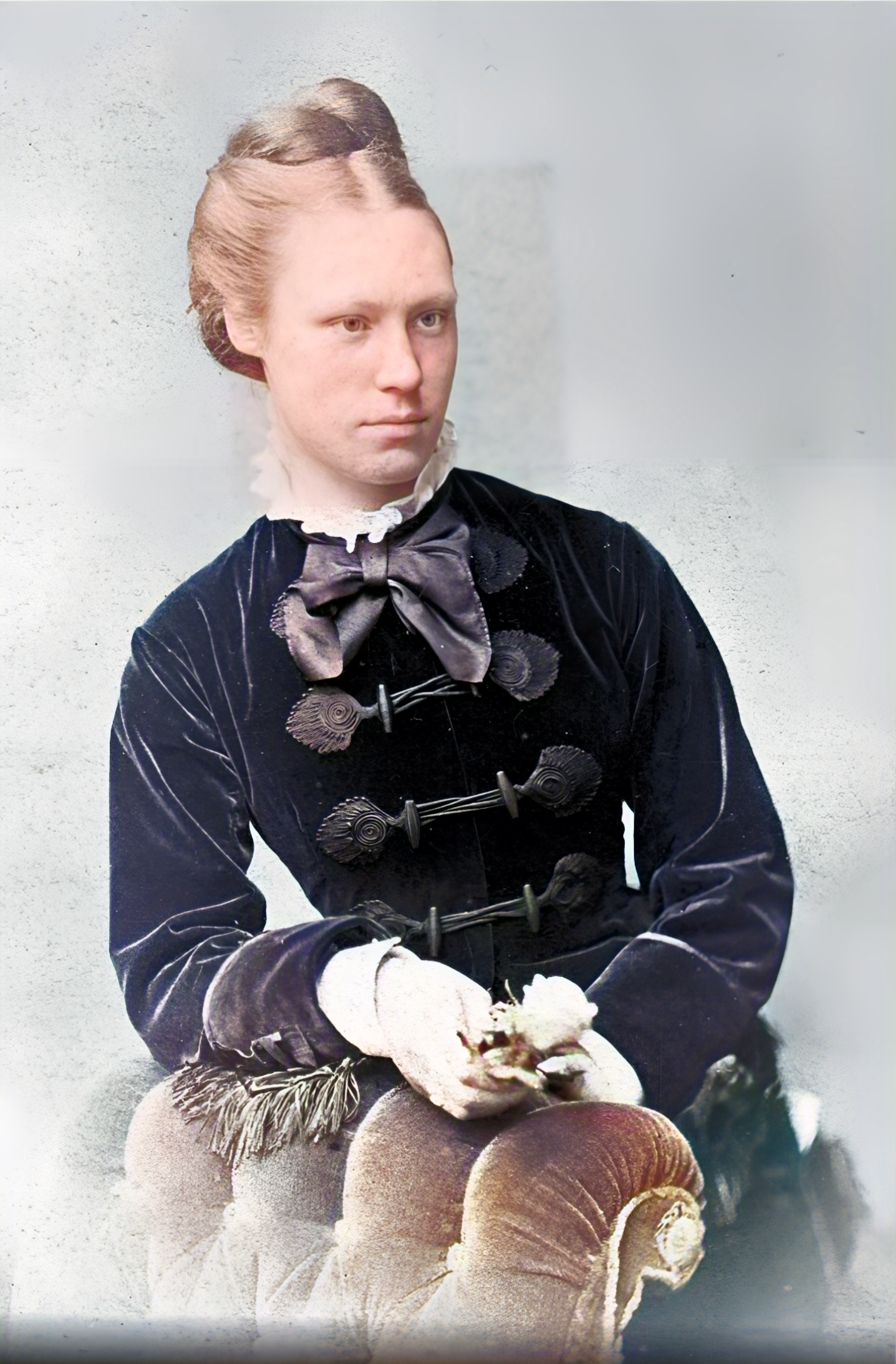
- Born: 7 February 1858; New South Wales, Australia
- Died: 6 January 1925 (aged 66); Nice, France
- Occupations: British medical doctor, writer

Lillias Anna Hamilton (7 February 1858 – 6 January 1925) was a British medical doctor and writer. She was born at Tomabil Station, New South Wales to Hugh Hamilton (1822– 1900) and his wife Margaret Clunes (née Innes). After attending school in Ayr and then Cheltenham Ladies' College, she trained first as a nurse, in Liverpool, before going on to study medicine in Scotland, qualifying as a Doctor of Medicine in 1890.

She was a court physician to Amir Abdur Rahman Khan in Afghanistan in the 1890s, and wrote a fictionalized account of her experiences in her book A Vizier's Daughter: A Tale of the Hazara War, published in 1900.

After a spell in private practice in London, she became Warden of Studley Horticultural College in the years before World War I, taking leave from the College in 1915 to serve in a typhoid hospital in Montenegro under the auspices of the Wounded Allies Relief Committee. Her published works include A Nurse's Bequest, 1907.

== Early life and education ==
Lillias Anna Hamilton was born on 7 February 1858 at Tomabil station, New South Wales, Australia. She was the eldest of four daughters and the third of the eight children of Hugh Hamilton (1822-1900) and Margaret Clunes (1829–1909). Her father was a farmer from Ayrshire, Scotland, and her mother was the daughter of George Innes of Yarrow, New South Wales.

Little is known about Lillias's childhood except that she was two when the family left Australia and settled, nominally, in Ayr, Scotland. The Hamilton's continued to travel until they moved to Cheltenham in 1874. Lillias attended the Ladies' College of Cheltenham for four years. Hamilton began to travel and even worked as a teacher, but in 1883, she began training as a nurse at the Liverpool workhouse infirmary.

In 1886, Hamilton decided to become a doctor, and enrolled at the London School of Medicine for Women. She obtained her LRCP (Licentiate of the Royal College of Physicians) and LRCS (Licentiate of the Royal College of Surgeons) at Edinburgh in 1890.

Hamilton was part of the first European generation of female physicians. Therefore, most of these women faced challenges in establishing private practice in most cities, and it was seemingly impossible through universities. Therefore, many of these female physicians (such as Dorothée Chellier and Françoise Legey) chose to practise overseas to places like Morocco and Algeria (respectively). Overseas, these women were able to take more initiative and demonstrate their talent as in times of war.

Despite much prejudice against female physicians practising in Europe, there was a substantial need for female doctors in India, as religious custom and practice deprived many women of proper medical care. Hamilton had met Colonel Joubert of the Indian Medical Service, and he introduced her to the opportunity of working abroad. Hamilton acquired her medical degree in Brussels and promptly left for Calcutta.

== Career ==
Most other foreign women doctors in the country received help from government appointment or support of any missionary or philanthropic society, but Hamilton established a successful private medical practice with help only from Colonel Joubert. She held the post of medical officer at the Lady Dufferin Zenana [Women's] Hospital in Calcutta. Her career changed drastically in the spring of 1894 when she moved to Kabul, Afghanistan.

=== Afghanistan ===
Hamilton was invited by Abdur Rahman, the then Emir or ruler of Afghanistan, to spend six months in Kabul. He paid for all of her expenses. After she successfully treated Abdur Rahman in October 1894, Hamilton became his personal physician for the next three years. Afghanistan was an inhospitable place for a European, especially a woman, to live.

Hamilton was a prolific journalist and the author of two fiction books. She had an unpublished work titled, The power that walks in darkness, in which she expressed her serious reservations about Abdur Rahman's often muddled reforms and his 'iron rule'. Even with the Emir's protection, her work still posed a threat to her own life, and she knew that a loss of the Emir's protection could result in her execution. Her work, A Vizier's Daughter was a fictional account of her time in Afghanistan in which she challenged "Islamic Stipulations", with sarcasm and perspectives on the Emir, and the male and female roles in this culture of Afghanistan.

In terms of her medical work, Hamilton made a significant impact on the health of the Afghan population. Not only did she establish a hospital in Kabul, but she was also responsible for introducing vaccination into the country. She expanded on techniques of treatment including maintenance of the four humors of the body based on traditional beliefs and treatments in the Qaran.

=== Return to England ===
By late 1896, Hamilton fled Afghanistan due to the threat and danger of her controversial writing and work. Once home in England, she redirected her attention to the predicament of homeless women's treatment, and in 1897, she co-founded the Victoria Women's Settlement in Liverpool. Soon after, she returned to private practice, setting up a nursing home in London.

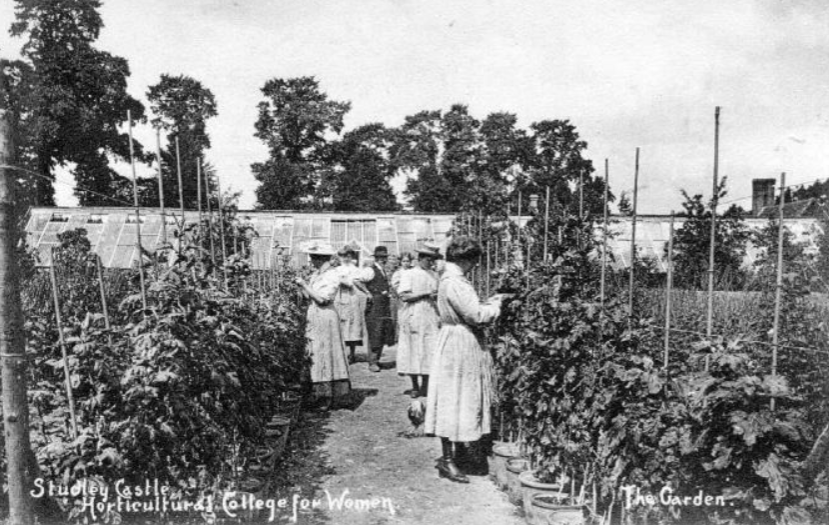
Studley College students in 1910

Hamilton and one of her brothers established a farm in the Transvaal Province. After two trips there, Lillias stopped practising to return to travelling. In 1908, she applied and was accepted as warden of Studley College in Warwick. This college was established in 1898 to train women for careers in agriculture and horticulture. At this time, Hamilton was an active member of the Women's Freedom League, which was founded in 1907, to obtain votes for women under thirty. After the outbreak of war she volunteered her medical services to the Wounded Allies Relief Committee in 1915, and ran a hospital in Podgoritza, Montenegro.

After the war she maintained tenure until she retired due to ill health in 1924. She was succeeded by Helen Ekins, an ex-student, who Hamilton had lauded as the "most highly qualified... in horticulture in England" just four years before when she gained a BSc.

== Personal life and death ==
Hamilton was claimed to be a highly accomplished and talented photographer and needlewoman, and also enjoyed music, painting, and the theatre.

Hamilton never married. She died on 6 January 1925 at the Queen Victoria Memorial Hospital, Nice, France, and was buried in the English cemetery on the Saturday after her death.

== Gallery ==
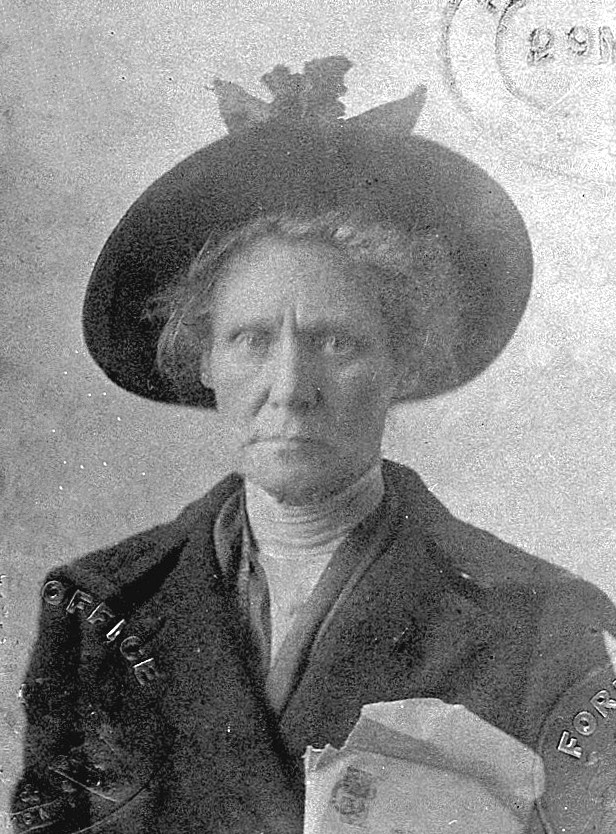
1920 passport photo

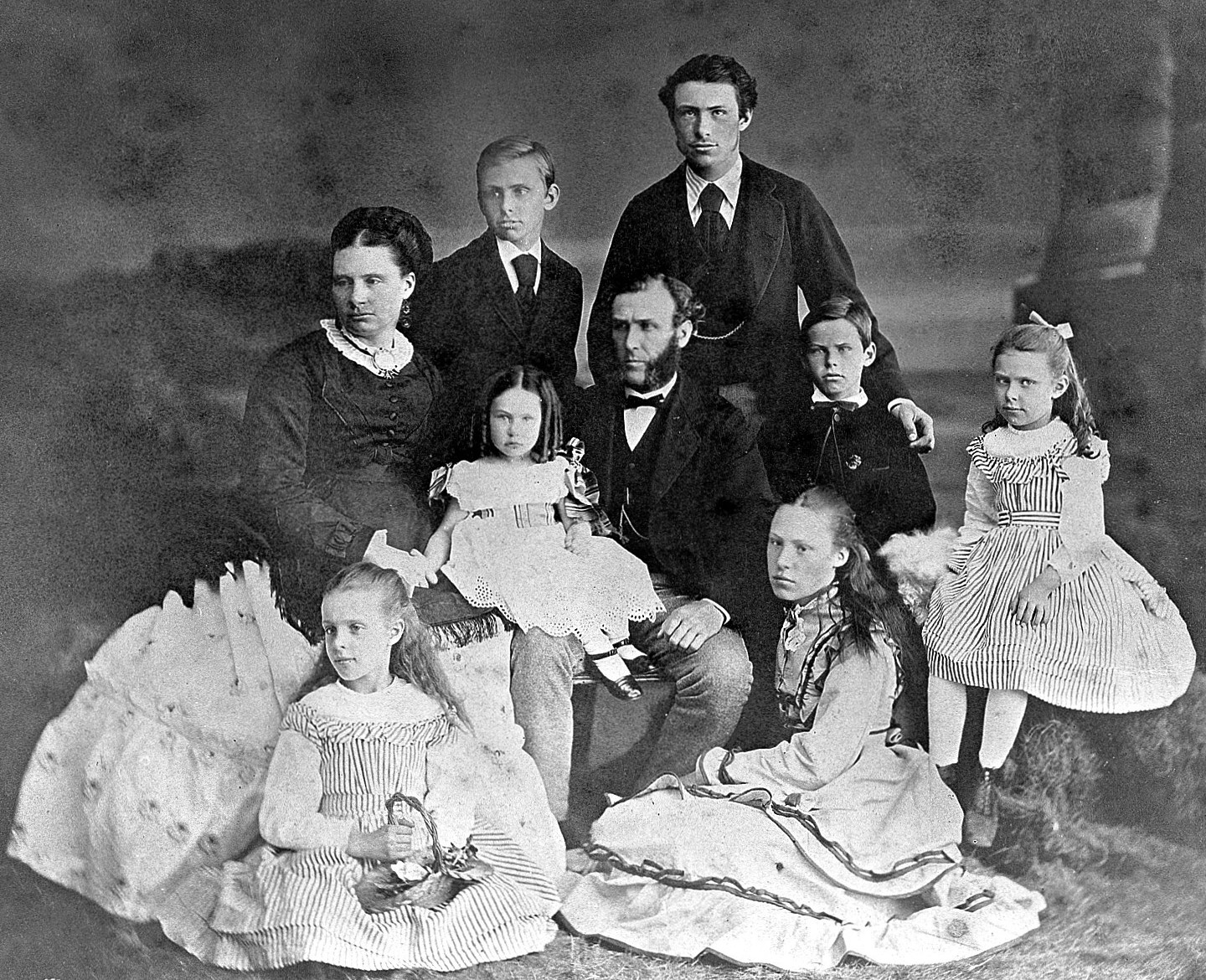
Hamilton with family

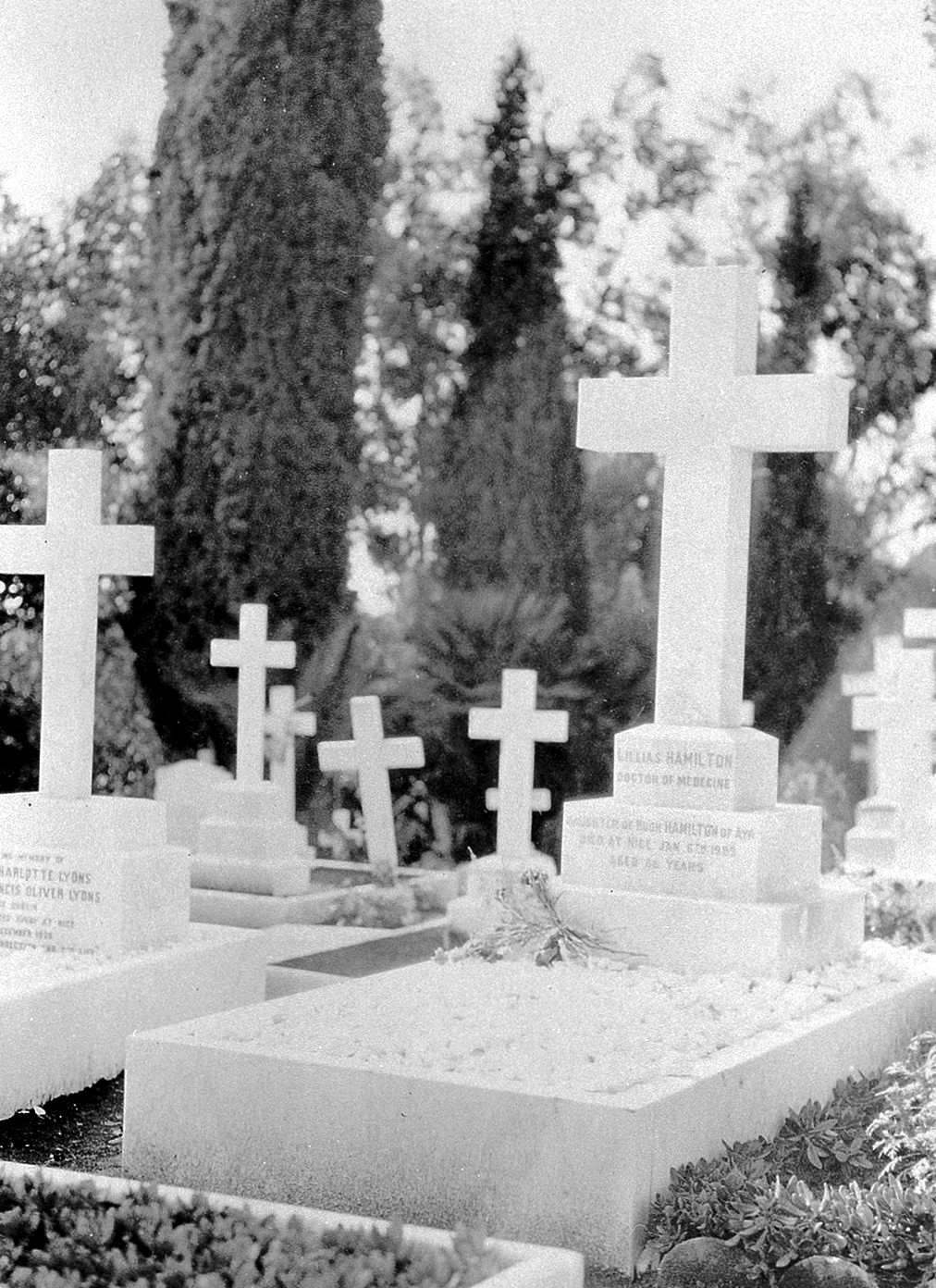
Hamilton's grave

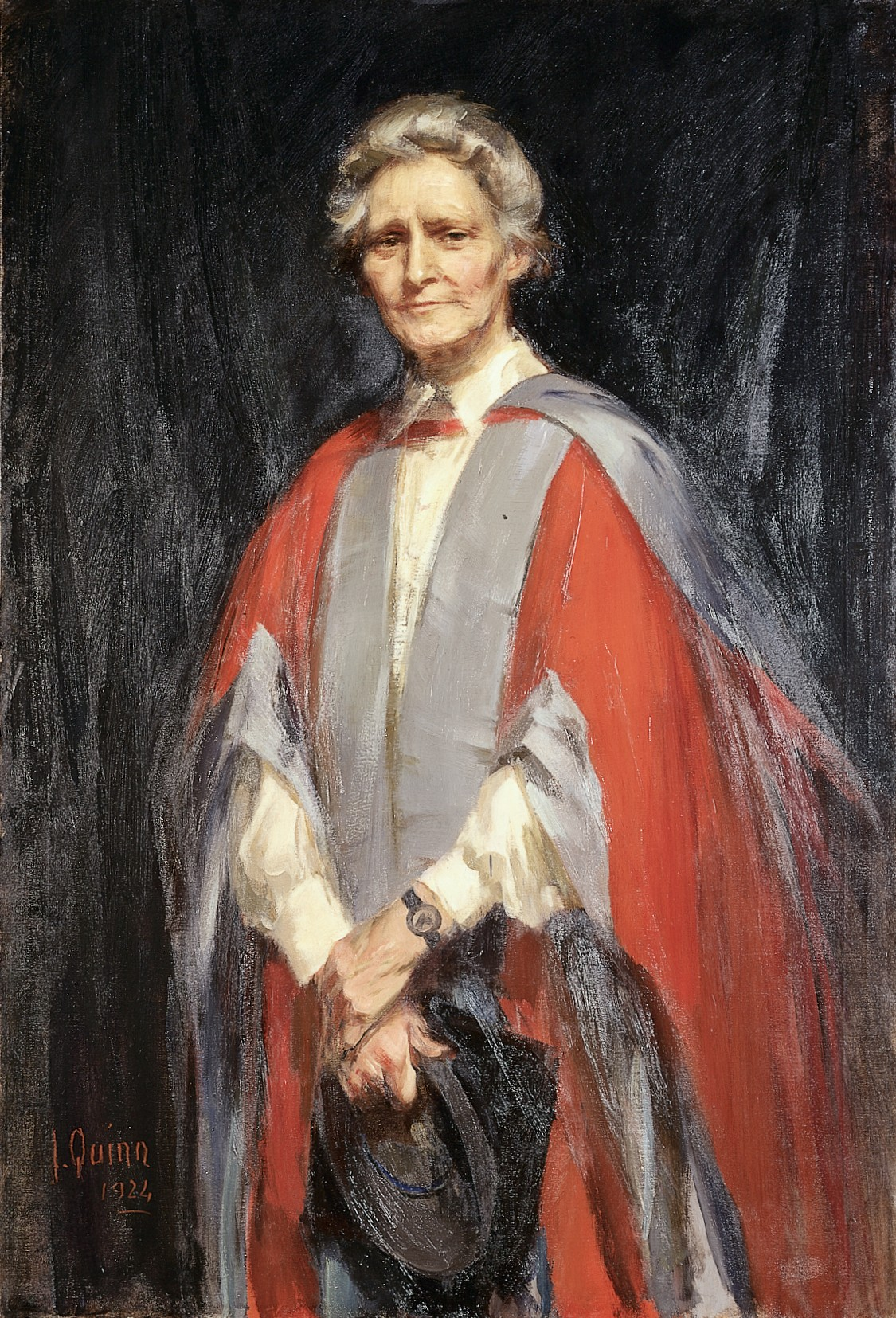
Oil painting of Lillias Hamilton painted by James Peter Quinn

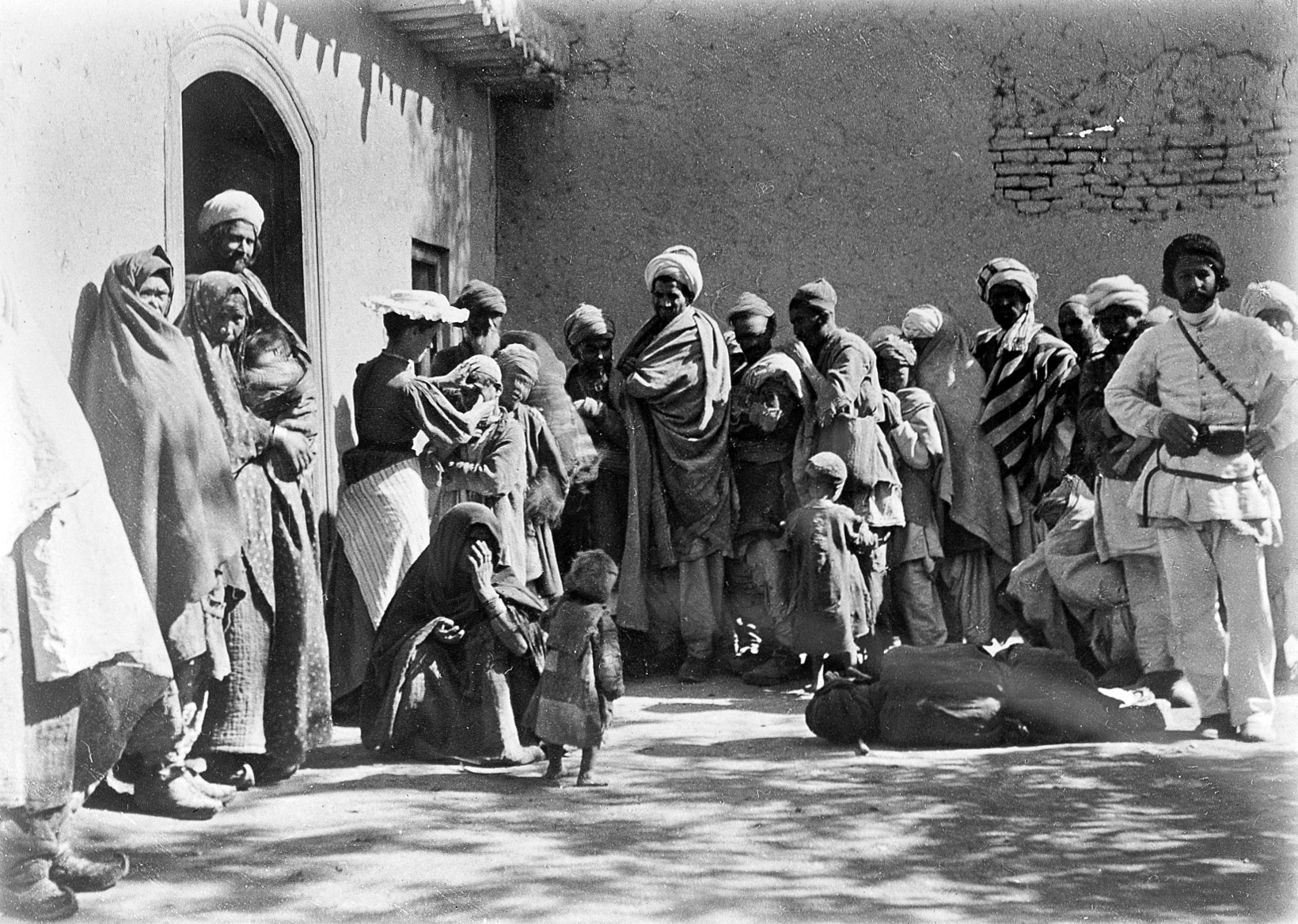
Hamilton examining a child's eyes in Kabul
