= John Christie (landowner) =

Scottish industrialist, arboriculturalist and landowner

John Christie FRSE (1824–1902) was a Scottish industrialist, arboriculturalist and landowner.

== Early life ==
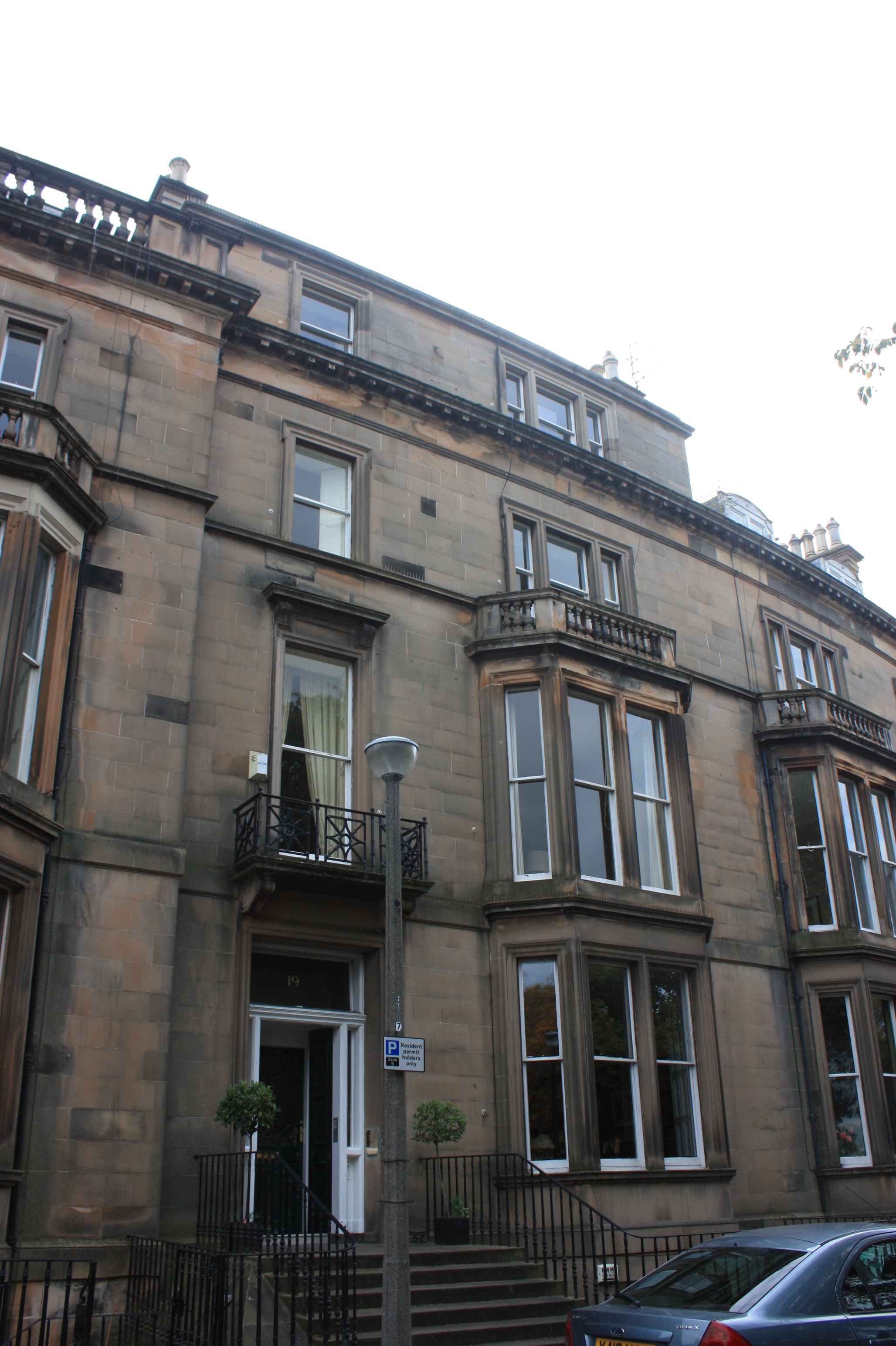
Christie's Edinburgh townhouse at 19 Buckingham Terrace

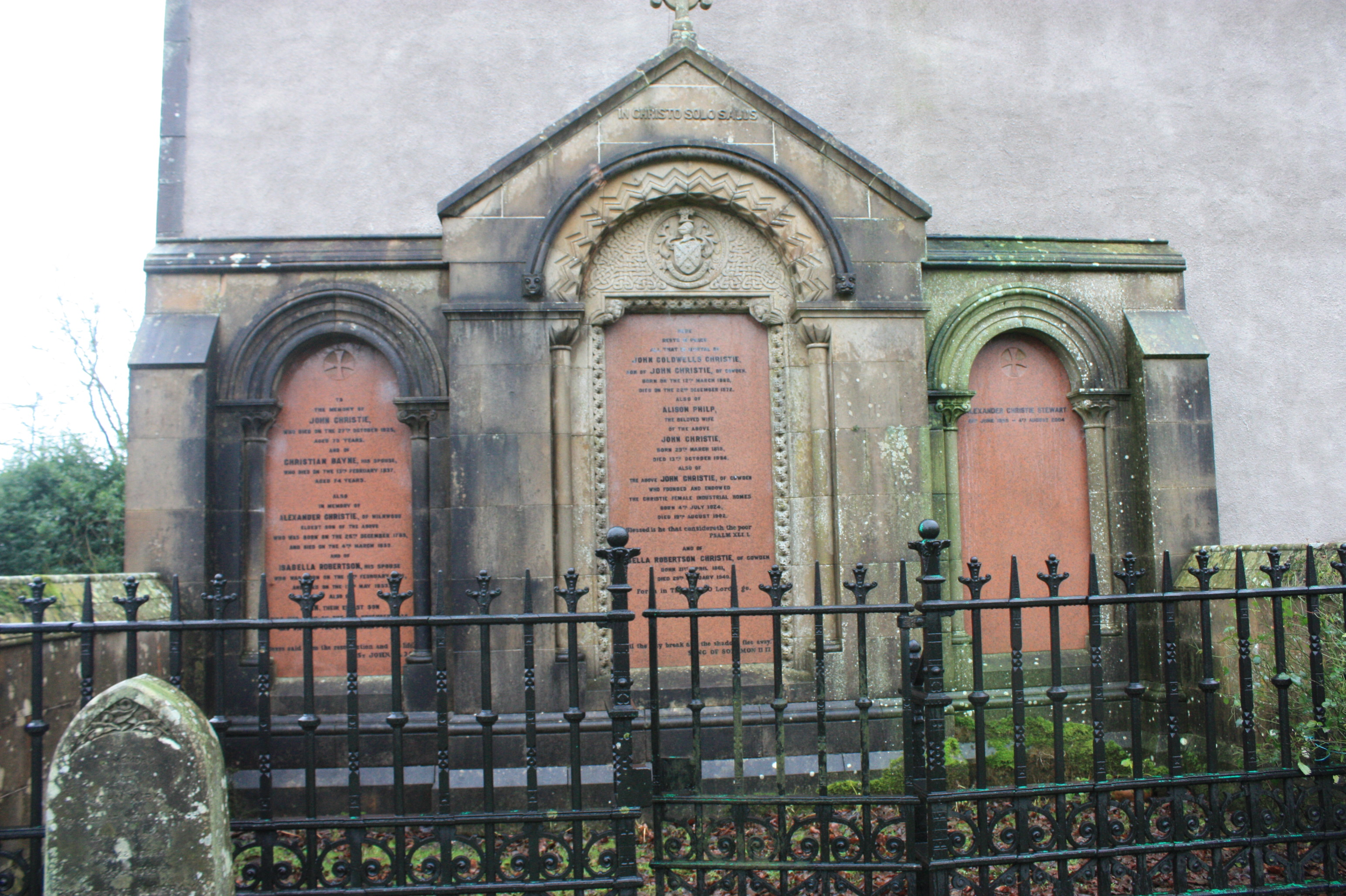
The grave of John Christie in Muckhart churchyard

He was born in Old Monkland on 4 July 1824, the son of Isabella Robertson and Alexander Christie (1789-1859), a colliery-owner and ironfounder. His first cousin, John Hill, lived with him. He attended Grange School in Northumberland and then the University of Glasgow.

== Adult life ==
On his father's death in 1859 he inherited vast lands in Ayrshire, Midlothian and Clackmannanshire, largely focussed upon coal-mining and iron-foundries. In 1865 he purchased a 524-acre estate lying between Dollar and Muckhart, and renamed it from Castleton to Cowden Castle. This estate provided a more rural environment than his other landholdings and focussed on farming, forestry and raising deer and pheasant.

John married Alison Philp (b. about 1817), daughter of Alison Coldwells and William Philp, of Stobsmills, Midlothian (the home of her uncle John Coldwells) on 27 April 1859.

Christie was a keen traveller and filled Cowden Castle with a wide range of artefacts. The estate grounds were replanted with many exotic species from around the world, and it was one of the estates that established the fashion for rhododendrons in the late 19th century.

He was elected a Fellow of the Royal Society of Edinburgh in 1875, his proposers including John Hutton Balfour.

In 1887 he suffered at attack of pernicious anaemia, leaving him in poor health. The illness had a dramatic effect on his character, which became eccentric, insular and argumentative. However, his lifestyle also changed to be more philanthropic (although not known to his family). In 1889 he founded Christie Homes, a series of orphanages for girls in the East Lothian area, later renamed Lothian Homes Trust.

His wife died in 1894. John Christie's eccentricity increased, dyeing his moustache and proposing to a woman 50 years his junior.

On 19 August 1902 Christie died at his home at 19 Buckingham Terrace, Edinburgh (age 78). He is buried in Muckhart Churchyard, against the east gable of the church.

At the time of his death his will demonstrated that, apart from the huge estates inherited from his father, he had acquired further estates in Glenfarg, Carnbo and other lands in Perthshire.

== Family ==
John and Alison Philp Christie had three children; John Coldwells, who died in childhood, Isabella (Ella) Robertson Christie (1861-1949) and Alice Margaret Christie. He encouraged his daughters to travel the world from an early age. Ella was a noted author and world traveller.

Alice Christie married Robert King Stewart, KBE, of Murdostoun at the age of seventeen in 1881. Thereafter she made her home at Murdostoun Castle in Lanarkshire.
