= Studley College =

Horticultural and agricultural college

Coordinates: 52.2747°N 1.8728°W

Studley Horticultural & Agricultural College for Women was a horticultural and agricultural college for women, near Studley in Warwickshire, England, which operated from 1898 until 1969.

== History ==
The college was founded by Daisy Greville, Countess of Warwick. In 1898 she had founded Warwick Hostel in Reading to offer training to 'surplus women in the lighter branches of agriculture'. Warwick Hostel expanded and moved to Studley Castle in Warwickshire in 1903, becoming Studley Horticultural & Agricultural College for Women. An early student was Adela Pankhurst, and an early warden (1908-1914, 1918-1922) was Dr Lillias Hamilton.

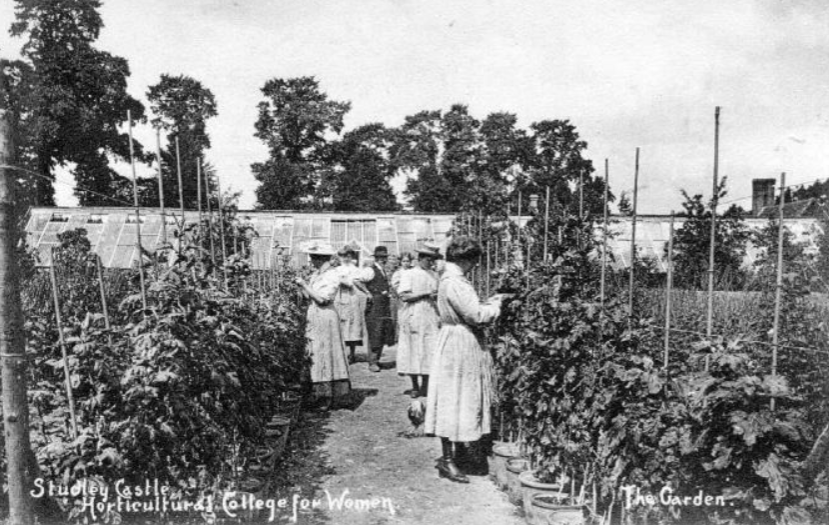
Studley College students in 1910

Students included Taki Handa, a student and instructor at Doshisha Women's College of Liberal Arts, Japan, who studied at Studley from 1906 to 1907 and designed a garden at Cowden Estate in Muckhart, Scotland. The College students undertook hard practical work in its greenhouses and vegetable gardens.

In 1920 Helen Ekins completed a part-time degree in horticulture at Birmingham University. Hamilton lauded her as the "most highly qualified... in horticulture in England". Hamilton had to retire due to ill health four years later and Ekins became the new warden.

The college offered a Diploma in Horticulture from 1924 and this was a three year course. In 1934 the college offered a degree course of the University of London leading to a BSc in horticulture. Ekins was to serve as warden until 1946, when Mrs. K.G.Woolacott, became the new warden. The plant collector, Clara Winsome Muirhead studied horticulture at Studley between 1933 and 1935.

It remained an all-women college throughout its existence, closing in 1969. The assets were used to found the Studley College Trust, a charitable trust that awards grants to students of agriculture and horticulture. The Museum of English Rural Life holds a collection of horticultural trophies, medals, and archival material relating to Studley College.

Studley Castle has since become a conference centre and wedding venue.

== Notable students ==
Some notable students of the college were:

- Adela Pankhurst (1885–1961), suffragette
- Isobel Wylie Hutchison (1889–1982), Arctic traveller, filmmaker and botanist
- Clara Winsome Muirhead (1916–1985), botanist and plant collector
- Helen Ekins (1879–1964), horticulturist and educational administrator
- Dion Fortune (1890–1946) occultist, ceremonial magician, novelist and author
- Georgiana Maxwell, 26th Baroness de Ros (1933–1983), peeress
- Taki Handa (1871–1956), Japanese horticulturist
