= Helen Ekins =

Horticulturist and educational administrator (1879–1964)

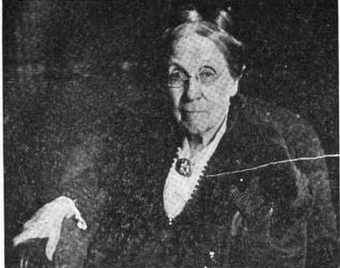
- Ekins in 1920
- Born: 9 November 1879; St Albans
- Died: 4 June 1964 (aged 84); Hitchin
- Education: Studley College, Birmingham University
- Occupation: College head

Helen Ekins (9 November 1879 – 4 June 1964) was a British horticulturist and educational administrator associated with Studley College which trained women in agriculture, in Warwickshire.

== Life ==
Ekins was born in St Albans. Her parents were Elizabeth Ann Childs and Arthur Edward Ekins. Her father was a pharmaceutical chemist and she was one of the first students at St Albans High School for Girls. After she left school she spent an unusual decade dedicating her spare time to growing vegetables and volunteering for work. The vegetables inspired an interest in horticulture that would last a lifetime.

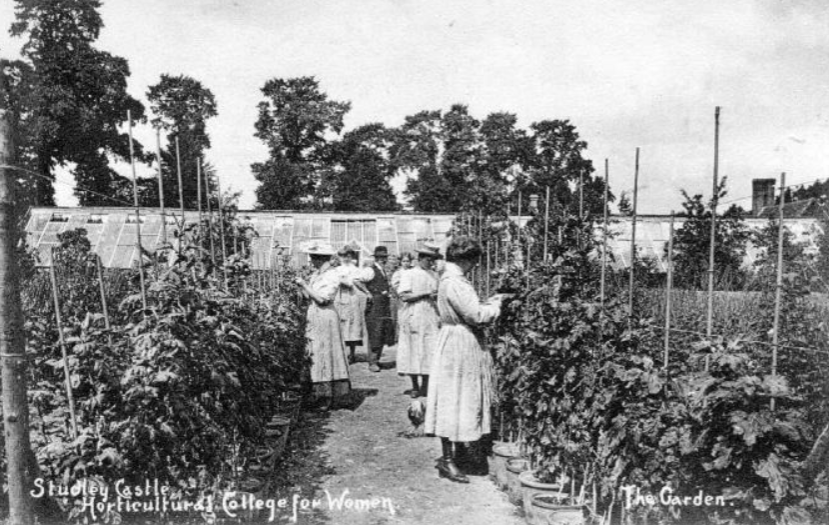
Students at Studley College in 1910 while Ekins was there

In 1909 there was mutual benefit to herself and Studley College for Women when she became a full-time student of horticulture. This college was established in 1898 to train women for careers in agriculture and horticulture. In 1909 it was led by Dr Lillias Hamilton who had become the warden the year before.

In 1920 she completed a part-time degree in Horticulture at Birmingham University. Hamilton lauded her as the "most highly qualified... in horticulture in England". Hamilton had to retire due to ill health four years later and Ekins became her successor. The college offered a Diploma in Horticulture from 1924 and this was a three-year course. In 1934 the college offered a degree course of the University of London leading to a BSc in horticulture.

Ekins was to serve as warden until after the war. In 1946, Mrs. K. G. Woolacott, became the new warden.

== Death and legacy ==
Ekins died in Hitchin in 1964. She left a substantial bequest to Studley College, but it closed several years later. Reading University gives a prize each year for a leading woman student in horticulture - the Helen Ekins Memorial prize.
