= Clara Winsome Muirhead =

Scottish botanist (1916–1985)

- Born: 6 January 1916; Cumbria, England
- Died: 7 March 1985 (aged 69); Grasmere, Cumbria, England
- Education: Studley College of Horticulture
- Known for: plant collecting, describing species of Sempervivum
- Scientific career
- Fields: botany, plant collecting
- Workplaces: Royal Botanic Garden, Edinburgh
- Author abbrev. (botany): Muirhead

Clara Winsome Muirhead (6 January 1916 – 7 March 1985) was a Scottish botanist and plant collector who spent most of her career at the Royal Botanic Garden in Edinburgh and was an expert on mosses, cacti, and succulents.

== Life ==
Clara Winsome Muirhead (known as "Win") was born in Cumbria, England to Scottish parents. Her father was in the Merchant Navy and her mother was a market gardener. She studied horticulture at Studley College, Warwickshire between 1933 and 1935. From 1938 to 1943, Muirhead worked in the herbarium at Tullie House Museum, Carlisle, and from 1943 to 1945, she was part of the Women's Royal Naval Service in the codebreaking department. Between 1953 and 1975, Muirhead worked at the herbarium at the Royal Botanics. She continued to collect and record plants until 1980, when she had a stroke. She bequeathed her personal herbarium collection to the University of Plymouth, where it became the Clara Winsome Muirhead Memorial Herbarium. She died of a heart attack on 7 March 1985.

== Work on Sempervivum ==
Muirhead described several new species in the genus Sempervivum. These include: S. artvinense, S. brevipilum, S. davisii, S. furseorum, S. gilliani, S. ispartae, and S. transcaucasicum.

== Recognition ==
A cultivar of Cassiope was named for Muirhead by R.B. Cooke, who named it C. 'Muirhead' (C. wardii x C. lycopodioides).

== Publications ==
Muirhead's published works include

- Muirhead, C.W. (1962) The Flora of Easdale and the Garvellachs. Transactions of the Botanical Society of Edinburgh, 39: 316–342. https://doi.org/10.1080/13594866209441714
- Muirhead, C.W. (1966) Sempervivum globiferum [S. transcaucasicum]. Notes from the Royal Botanic Garden Edinburgh, 26: 284-285
- Muirhead, C.W. (1969) Turkish species of Sempervivum. Notes from the Royal Botanic Garden, Edinburgh, 29: 15-28
