= John Hill (planter) =

American industrialist (1824–1910)

John Hill (March 12, 1824 – June 7, 1910) of Homestead Plantation was a wealthy industrialist, sugar planter, philanthropist, and benefactor of Louisiana State University.

== Early life in Scotland ==
John Hill was born in Old Monkland (now part of Coatbridge), Lanarkshire, Scotland, where his family operated coal mines and iron works, on March 12, 1824, to George Hill (January 1785 – 1852) and Isabella Christie (1787 – c. 1837) (sister to coal mine owner Alexander Christie (1789 – 1859) of Milnd). Hill was baptized on March 28, 1824, at Old Monkland Parish Church. Hill was the second-born of six children.

After the death of his mother and siblings in an epidemic, he was reared for part of his life in the Milnwood, (near Bellshill) Lanarkshire home of his uncle, coal and iron mine owner Alexander Christie, along with his cousin, Mr. John Christie (1822–1902).

Hill entered the iron foundry of his uncle, Alexander Christie, at an early age and acquired a knowledge of foundry work.

Hill was reared in the Presbyterian denomination and claimed descent from Scottish Covenanters and an ancestor who fought at the Battle of Bothwell Bridge in 1679.

== Adult life in the United States ==
John Hill came to the United States for a visit in 1844, by a voyage of seven weeks on a sailing ship, arriving in New York City on July 4, 1844 but never returned to Scotland. He travelled through the Northeastern states and Canada and then came to the South in 1845 by sailing ship. He also travelled around the South. Seeing opportunity in Baton Rouge, Louisiana, he settled in Baton Rouge in 1846.

Hill started an iron foundry in partnership with Mr. J. William Markham at the foot of North Street in Baton Rouge at the age of twenty-four (1848).

Hill lived with John McKenzie, a thirty-five-year-old blacksmith and native of Scotland, and his family in Baton Rouge in 1850.

John Hill met a Scottish lady, Catherine McPhail (born 8 February 1819) of Glasgow, in Baton Rouge, and they were married in 1851 by Reverend Jahleel Woodbridge, pastor of the First Presbyterian Church. The Hills were members of the First Presbyterian Church until their deaths.

Hill also owned a sawmill on the bank of the Mississippi River, which was near the present location of the Louisiana Court of Appeal, First Circuit, and a steam-powered ferry boat named the Sunny South. James Irving was the engineer and Alexander Banes was the fireman of the Sunny South.

The Hills built a beautiful two-story mansion (no longer extant) at 638 Lafayette Street in Baton Rouge, which they named Homestead, as indicated by a brass plate near the front door. The mansion was situated on the northernmost lot on the east side of Lafayette Street. It was just to the south of the Pentagon Barracks. Inside there were double parlors divided by pocket doors to the left of the hallway and a large dining room to the rear. A library was accessed through a door under the steps. There was a garden on the south side of the mansion.

== Children ==
The children born to John and Catherine Hill were:

=== Isabella Christie Hill ===
- Isabella Christie Hill, (born January 1, 1852). Isabella and Douglas Cullum Montan (January 28, 1834 – June 9, 1896) were married at Homestead Plantation on August 21, 1872, by Reverend J. A. McConnell. Isabella died January 24, 1874 (age 22) at Homestead Plantation.

=== John Hill, Jr. ===
- John Hill, Jr., (born August 28, 1855). John Hill, Jr. served on the faculty of Louisiana State University. He died November 10, 1893 (age 38).

=== Deceased infant ===
- George Hill, twin to John Hill, (born August 28, 1855). George died as an infant in July 1856. Another son born later also was named George Hill.

=== Katherine Marion Hill ===
- Katherine Marion Hill, (born December 25, 1856). Miss Katherine taught a woman's Bible study at the First Presbyterian Church of Baton Rouge, which she named the "Class Beautiful". She resided at the family home at 638 Lafayette Street in Baton Rouge, where she moved in 1911 after the death of her father and where she received her second cousin, the famed Victorian lady traveller, Miss Ella Christie, in 1914. She died on February 25, 1949 (age 93).

=== George Hill ===
- George Hill, (born August 28, 1858). George married Carrie Lee Taylor (April 4, 1872 – July 28, 1960), daughter of William Thomas Taylor and Mary F. Hubbard of Snowdoun, Montgomery County, Alabama at Brewton, Alabama, in 1907. George Hill died at Homestead Plantation, January 21, 1941 (age 82).

=== Margaret Alice Hill ===
- Margaret Alice Hill, July 3, 1861. Margaret married Dr. Frank H. Carruth (August 18, 1860 – March 15, 1953.) at Homestead Plantation on October 20, 1887. Margaret Hill Carruth died October 27, 1933 (age 72) at Gulfport, Mississippi.

The children of John Hill and their spouses are buried in Magnolia Cemetery.

== Life during the American Civil War ==
After Baton Rouge was captured by the North in May 1862 during the American Civil War, John Hill's home was commandeered to be used as quarters for officers. He obtained permission from Admiral David Farragut, aboard his flagship, USS Hartford, to move his family across the Mississippi River to West Baton Rouge Parish. The Hill family took refuge along with two other families in the small "hut" of a Mr. Watson near the plantation of Abraham Lobdell.

His industrial properties in Baton Rouge were destroyed by Northern forces in 1862. Although most structures north of North Street were burned by the Union forces, the John Hill mansion survived because it was used as the Union headquarters.

== Post war life ==
After the war, Hill purchased a bankrupt sugar property, the property of Mrs. Mary Ann Barrow, widow of Senator Alexander Barrow, at sheriff's sale on February 6, 1866, and went into the cultivation of sugar cane. He reportedly made the first sugar in West Baton Rouge Parish after the Civil War. Little by little adjacent properties were acquired to add to his agricultural property.

John Hill had become friendly with the former fireman on the Sunny South, Alexander Banes. In 1874, he helped Banes to purchase a tract of land in West Baton Rouge Parish on the River Road. There Banes developed a three-street community known as "Sunrise."

John Hill resided on the bank of the Mississippi River in an existing Louisiana raised cottage style house for the remainder of his life. Catherine McPhail died there on December 22, 1889 (about age 70), and was buried in Magnolia Cemetery.

John Hill's daughter, Katherine, remained at home and served as his housekeeper for the remainder of his life. After his death, she moved to the family mansion at 638 Lafayette Street in Baton Rouge.

== Donation of de Boré sugar kettle ==
John Hill purchased the cast iron sugar kettle, which had been used by Étienne de Boré in 1795 in the first successful granulation of sugar in Louisiana. This event marked the start of the sugar industry in Louisiana. John Hill subsequently donated the sugar kettle to Louisiana State University where it remains on display.

== Donation of Hill Memorial Library ==
John Hill's elder son, John Hill, Jr., predeceased him on November 10, 1893. John Hill wished to create a memorial for his son, who had been a member of the Board of Supervisors of Louisiana State University (LSU). He donated $33,000 (~$922,236 in 2024) to the University for a library which was constructed on the campus of LSU on North Third Street in Baton Rouge and completed in 1903. The library was named the Hill Memorial Library in memory of John Hill, Jr. The donation of the library was sorely needed and of great importance to LSU, because the university previously had had to house its books in an old powder magazine.

LSU moved to a new campus and a new library was constructed in the new campus and named the Hill Memorial Library. The original Hill Memorial Library became the State Library of Louisiana, however it was eventually pulled down and replaced with a newer library building on the same site.

== Death ==
John Hill died suddenly in his office at Homestead Plantation on June 7, 1910, at the age of 86 years and was buried in Magnolia Cemetery in Baton Rouge. The First Presbyterian Church built a Sunday school annex behind its former sanctuary (no longer extant) at Florida and Fourth Street in 1911, which it named the Hill Memorial Annex. It was dedicated "To the Glory of God and Mr. and Mrs. John Hill."'
