= 23 Stirling–St Andrews =

Bus route in Scotland

23

Overview
- Operator: Stagecoach East Scotland
- Began service: 1930s
- Ended service: 2020

Route
- Start: Stirling
- End: St Andrews

The 23 was a bus service which ran from Stirling to St Andrews via Kinross. It was withdrawn in 2020, with parts of the route being replaced by local services.

== History ==
=== Operation ===
The route dated back to the 1930s, at which time it was numbered 298 and operated by W. Alexander & Sons between Buchanan bus station, Glasgow, and St Andrews. The service was later renumbered as 23. After the company was split in 1961 by its parent, the Scottish Bus Group, the service was operated by Alexander (Midland) and Alexander (Fife). In 1981, the route was shortened, with its eastern terminus now at Stirling. However, some Glasgow to St Andrews journeys continued to operate on Friday and Saturday evenings primarily for the benefit of university students. Through privatisation of British bus services and subsequent ownership changes, the route was acquired by Fife Scottish, part of the Stagecoach group.

=== Decline and withdrawal ===
Service levels were progressively reduced, with Stagecoach citing a "decrease in demand". In 2017 only three return journeys ran per day. The number 23 bus was withdrawn completely in 2020. Stagecoach stated that it had been underperforming prior to the COVID-19 pandemic and that it was operating at "a significant loss". The withdrawal drew criticism from local MSPs.

=== Replacement services ===
On 14 September 2020, First Scotland East introduced a new service numbered X53 as a partial replacement, operating on the same route as the number 23 between Stirling and Kinross approximately every two hours. It served areas, notably Muckhart, that would otherwise have no bus service. Residents in Gateside complained about the loss of bus services to St Andrews.

In November 2021, First announced that the route would be suspended in January unless more drivers became available to operate it. In early December, local MSP Mark Ruskell met with First to discuss the withdrawal of the route, with First continuing to cite a lack of drivers as the reason for withdrawal, and the planned withdrawal of the route was discussed during a debate in the Scottish Parliament on 15 December 2021. However, on 20 December, First confirmed that the route would be withdrawn as planned. The X53 route was withdrawn on 10 January 2022 during a timetable change that also saw the frequency of other routes reduced from half-hourly to hourly.

A new replacement service, numbered 202, was introduced by Perth and Kinross Council and Bay Travel on 10 January 2022. It runs between Kinross and Tillicoultry, where passengers can change for the First Bus service 52 to Stirling.

== Alternative services ==
Today, the X24 service from Glasgow to St Andrews is significantly quicker than the number 23. However, it does not travel via Stirling or Kinross. To get this service, one would have to get service 38 from Stirling bus Station to Falkirk, getting off at Forth Valley Royal Hospital for the change to St Andrews.
