= Dorothée Chellier =

French-Algerian physician

- Born: 18 February 1860; Algiers
- Died: 5 March 1935 (aged 75); Nice
- Occupation: Medical doctor

Dorothée Chellier (18 February 1860 – 5 March 1935) was a French-Algerian physician. She became the first female physician in Algeria in 1895, working there periodically until 1899. She undertook four medical missions there, working with women in the Aurès and Kabylie regions who had previously had no access to healthcare. Chellier joined a French Masonic lodge that advocated gender equality and devoted the final years of her life to obstetrics and gynaecology.

== Early life and education ==
Dorothée Chellier was born on 18 February 1860 in Algiers. She began her career as a public health officer, studying at and qualifying from the Algiers School of Public Health in 1887. A student of André Chantemesse, she went on to earn her doctorate in medicine in 1894, making her one of the early cohort of French women doctors of medicine. Madeleine Brès had been the first French woman to qualify as a medical doctor in the country in 1875.

== Medical missions to French Algeria ==
Chellier undertook four medical missions in the Aurès and Kabylie regions of what was then French Algeria between 1895 and 1899, working with women with minimal access to healthcare. She kept a diary of her activities that she published in 1895 as Voyage dans l’Aurès: notes d’un médecin envoyé en mission chez les femmes arabes (Journey to the Aurès: notes of a doctor sent on a mission to Arab women). Chellier sought to bring about change in medical practices. She strongly believed that coercion would not change people's attitudes and beliefs, but medical improvements could be achieved through education and the gradual instilling of new habits.

Chellier recorded that women's health was in a poor state, with both syphilis and the conditions surrounding childbirth taking a particularly heavy toll on both mothers and children. Officially, her medical missions were limited to conducting an assessment of the situation, as she had been instructed to do by Jules Cambon, Governor General of Algeria, but she went beyond her remit by providing medical care.
