= Japanese garden at Cowden =

Garden in Clackmannanshire, Scotland

Coordinates: 56.1797°N 3.6411°W

Designations

Inventory of Gardens and Designed Landscapes in Scotland
- Official name: Cowden Japanese-Style Garden
- Designated: 25 July 2013
- Reference no.: GDL00402

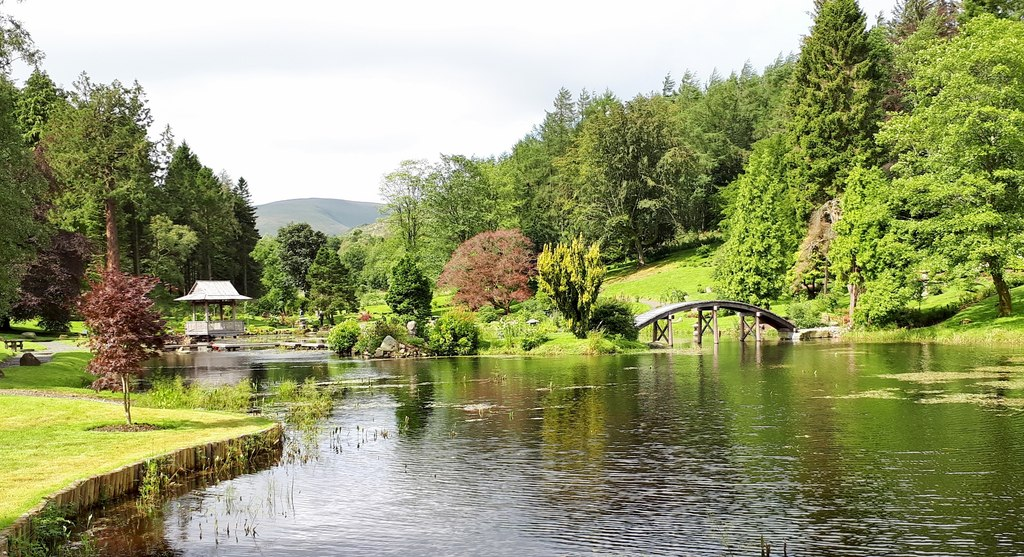
The pond at the Cowden Garden

The Japanese garden at Cowden is located near the town of Dollar in Clackmannanshire, Scotland, on the grounds of the Cowden Castle estate. The garden is the only one of its type in the world to have been designed by a Japanese woman, horticulturist Taki Handa.

== History ==
The garden was created in 1908 by Scottish traveller Ella Christie, but it was closed to the public in 1955 after an act of extensive vandalism. After undergoing prolonged restoration under the supervision of Professor Masao Fukuhara of the Osaka University of Arts and with involvement of local teams and visiting students, the garden reopened in 2019. It was tended over the years by Japanese gardener Shinzaburo Matsuo and supervised on several occasions by the Hereditary Head of the Soami School of Imperial Garden Design at Nagoya, Jijo Suzuki. The Cowden Garden is now managed by the Cowden Castle SCIO charitable trust.

== Description ==
The garden, which was initially named in Japanese as Sha Raku En (the place of pleasure and delight) was later described in 1925 by Professor Jijo Suzuki as 'the most important Japanese garden in the Western World'.

The garden itself is a stroll garden consisting of several acres of Japanese influenced landscape with a perimeter path around the small artificial loch. There are two ornamental bridges — one zigzag (yatsuhashi) and another arched (sorihashi) — both symbolising the human journey through life.

At the far end of the loch, there is a dry garden (karesansui), with four mossed rock islands presented as turtles and surrounded by raked pebbles. A number of different stone lanterns are placed along the path and several wooden roofed structures further decorate the landscape: the summer pavilion (azumaya), a thatched garden pavilion/tearoom (chashitsu), two roofed gates (on north and south sides each), and a main entrance gate (torii).

The site is populated with many endogenous Scottish plants, trees, herbs, shrubs, and mosses/lichens, with recent addition of some cherry trees — all of which provides a unique aesthetic fusion of Japanese culture and Scottish biomes. Red squirrels can often be seen in the garden.
