= Taki Handa =

Japanese horticulturist

- Undated photographer of Taki Handa, from a 2015 publication.
- Born: 1871; Kurume, Kyushu
- Died: 1956 (aged 84–85)
- Other names: Handa Taki, Nakanome Taki, Taki Nakanome
- Occupations: Horticulturist, landscape designer

Taki Handa (1871–1956) was a Japanese horticulturist, best known for designing and directing the construction of a Japanese garden in Scotland in 1908.

== Early life ==
Handa was born in Kurume, Kyushu. Her father was a prison guard who also mended umbrellas; her older brother Handa Hisao was a military physician and helped support the family. She studied Chinese literature, weaving, and English as a girl, and was baptised as a Christian at age 16, then trained to be a teacher at a school in Fukuoka. She attended Doshisha Women's College in Kyoto, and Mary Florence Denton, an American faculty member there, encouraged Handa to seek further studies abroad. She attended Studley College in England from 1906 to 1908.

== Career ==
Handa taught in Tokyo for a few years as a young woman. In 1908, while living in Britain, Handa designed a seven-acre Japanese garden at Cowden Castle in Clackmannanshire for Ella Christie, who had traveled extensively in Asia and wanted to recreate the Japanese garden aesthetic. The garden was admired and popular, and Christie continued to employ Japanese caretakers for the garden, pond, and teahouse, to maintain Handa's ideas. In 1955, after Christie had died and Cowden Castle was demolished, the Japanese garden was closed to public visits; in time, it was vandalised and fell into ruin.

On her return to Japan, Handa taught botany, horticulture and English at Doshisha Women's College in Kyoto. She retired from teaching in 1919, and was in charge of a family orchard at Mizusawa beginning in the 1920s, until 1932, when she left the operation in her stepson's care.

Handa was a fellow of the Royal Horticultural Society.

== Personal life ==
Handa married in 1910, to Seiichi Nakanome, a widowed physician with six children. They had two daughters together. "Within two years [of] getting married, I became a wife, a mother and a grandmother, which are all interesting experiences for me," she wrote in 1912. She was widowed when her husband died in 1938; she died in 1956, in her mid-80s.

Taki Nakanome's granddaughter Tamae Hoshi visited the Japanese Garden in Clackmannanshire in 2010. Restoration began in 2013 by Christie's great-great-niece Sara Stewart, and the garden was reopened to visitors in 2019.
