= Snowdoun, Alabama =

- Unincorporated community
- Location within Alabama Location within the United States
- Coordinates: 32°14′30″N 86°17′47″W
- Country: United States
- State: Alabama
- County: Montgomery
- Elevation: 282 ft (86 m)
- Time zone: UTC-6 (Central (CST))
  - Summer (DST): UTC-5 (CDT)
- Area code: 334
- GNIS feature ID: 127083

Snowdoun is an unincorporated community in Montgomery County, Alabama, United States. Snowdoun is located on U.S. Highway 331 9.5 miles (15.3 km) south of Montgomery.

== History ==
Snowdoun was named by William Falconer in honor of Mount Snowdon in Wales. A post office operated under the name Snowdoun from 1859 to 1957. Snowdoun is located along the route of the Federal Road.

Snowdoun was formerly connected to Montgomery by the Montgomery Southern Railway, a narrow gauge railway.

William Bartram camped near Snowdoun on his expedition through the southern colonies.
