= Carnbo =

Hamlet in Perth and Kinross, Scotland

Coordinates: 56.211026°N 3.528354°W

Carnbo: Scottish Gaelic: Càrn Bò
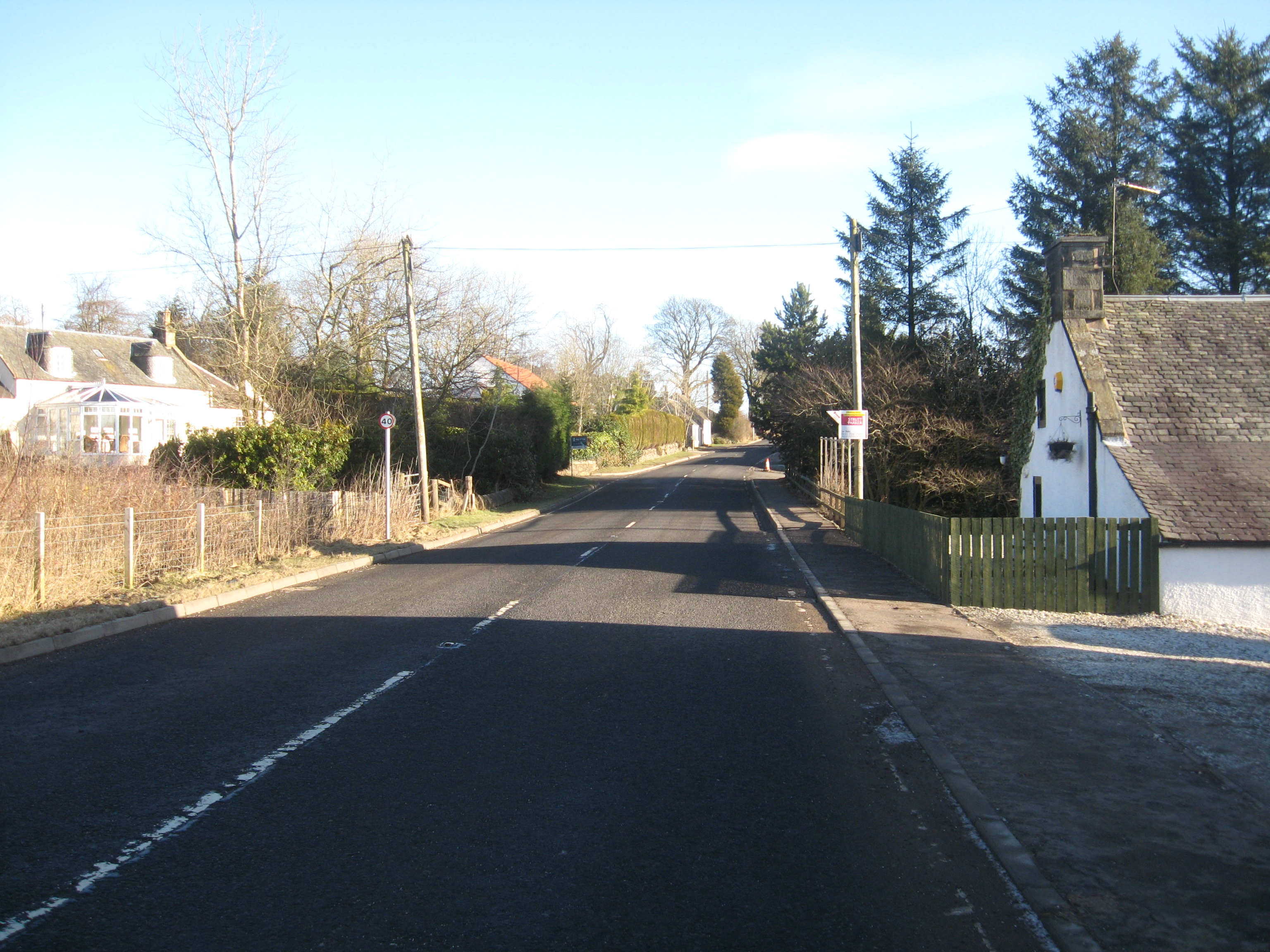
- Carnbo

- Location within Perth and Kinross
- OS grid reference: NO053031
- Council area: Perth and Kinross
- Lieutenancy area: Perth and Kinross
- Country: Scotland
- Sovereign state: United Kingdom
- Post town: KINROSS
- Postcode district: KY13
- Dialling code: 01577
- Police: Scotland
- Fire: Scottish
- Ambulance: Scottish
- UK Parliament: Perth and Kinross-shire
- Scottish Parliament: Ochil

Carnbo (from Scottish Gaelic: Càrn Bò "cairn of cows") is a hamlet in Perth and Kinross, Scotland. It lies approximately 6 miles (10 kilometres) west of Kinross, on the A91 road on the South Queich burn.
