= James Noble =

James Noble may refer to:

- James Noble (actor) (1922–2016), American actor
- James Noble (American football) (born 1963), American football wide receiver
- James Noble (clergyman) (c. 1876–1941), Australian missionary
- James Noble (computer scientist), professor at Victoria University of Wellington, New Zealand
- James Noble, British motocross racer in 2008 FIM Motocross World Championship etc.
- James Noble (Indiana politician) (1785–1831), U.S. Senator from Indiana
- James Noble (geologist) (1800–1848), Scottish minister, antiquarian, geologist and fossil collector
- James Noble (Royal Navy officer) (1774–1851), British navy admiral
- James Campbell Noble (1846–1913), Scottish painter
- James H. Noble (1851–1912), American physician and politician

== See also ==
- James Noble Tyner (1826–1904), lawyer and U.S. Representative
- Jamie Noble (born 1976), American former professional wrestler
- Jim Noble (disambiguation)
