= Alexander Lindsay of Evelick =

Alexander Lindsay of Evelick may refer to:

- Alexander Lindsay of Evelick (bishop) (c. 1561–1639), Scottish minister and bishop

== See also ==
- Alexander Lindsay (disambiguation)
