= Catoctin Formation =

Geologic formation in the eastern US

- Stratigraphic range: Ediacaran
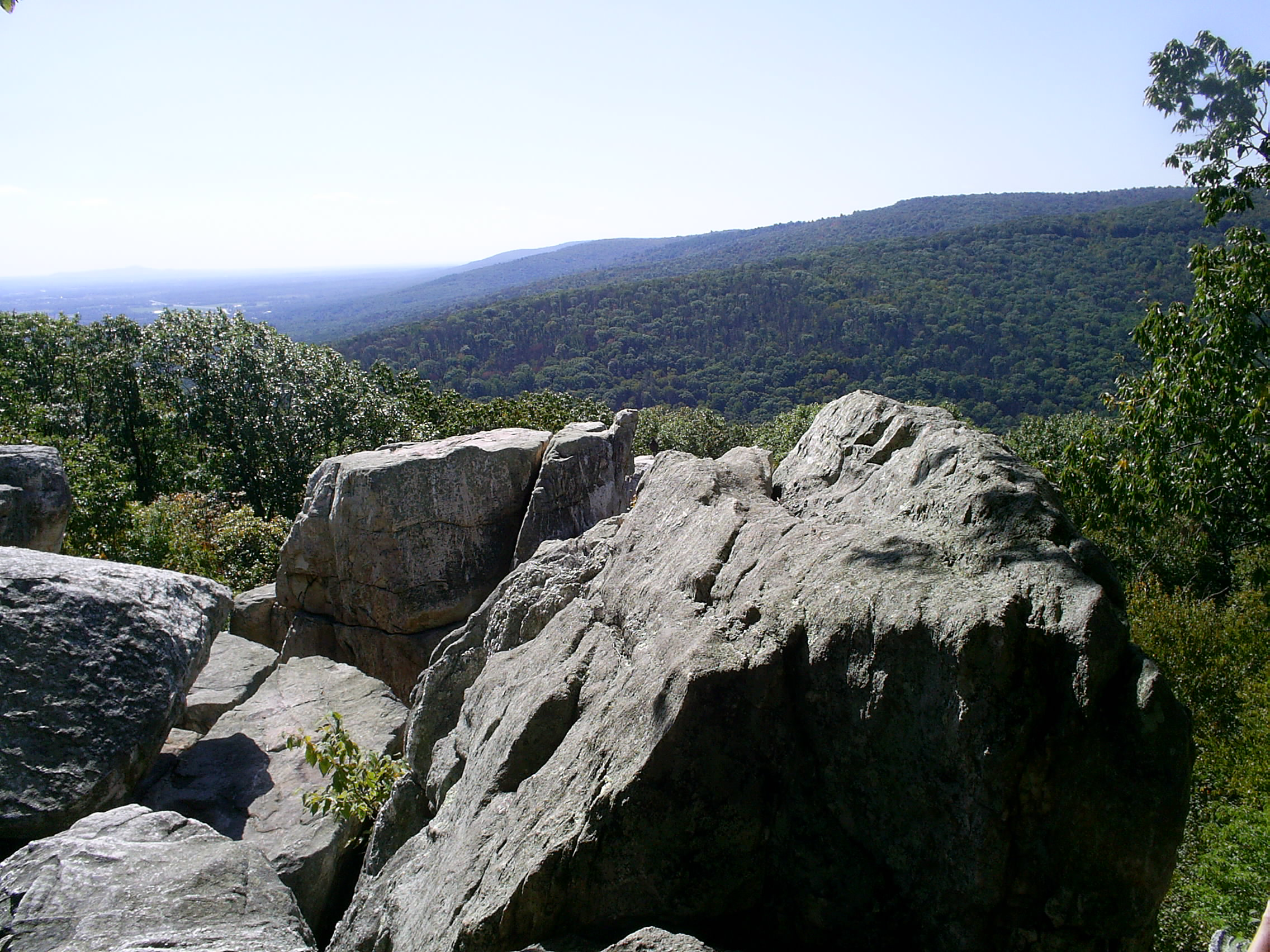
- Type: Formation
- Underlies: Chilhowee Group
- Overlies: Basement Rock
- Thickness: 100-400 Feet

Location
- Region: Virginia, Maryland, and Pennsylvania
- Country: United States

Type section
- Named for: Its exposure on Catoctin Mountain
- Named by: Arthur Keith
- Geological Map of the Catoctin Formation shown in blue and other formations associated with it.

The Catoctin Formation is a geologic formation that expands through Virginia, Maryland, and Pennsylvania. It dates back to the Precambrian and is closely associated with the Harpers Formation, Weverton Formation, and the Loudoun Formation. The Catoctin Formation lies over a granitic basement rock and below the Chilhowee Group making it only exposed on the outer parts of the Blue Ridge. The Catoctin Formation contains metabasalt, metarhyolite, and porphyritic rocks, columnar jointing, low-dipping primary joints, amygdules, sedimentary dikes, and flow breccias. Evidence for past volcanic activity includes columnar basalts and greenstone dikes.

== Stratigraphy ==
Stratigraphy of the Catoctin Formation is closely related to the Harpers Formation, Weverton Formation, and the Loudon Formation.

The Harpers Formation is part of the Chilhowee Group. This formation is found above the Weverton Formation and is around 2000–2750 feet in thickness. This formation contains gray phyllite and slate which can be found with banded quartz throughout the rock. It varies in thickness throughout the area and has folds such as anticlines that cause the formation to repeat on itself. Lots of cleavages can also be found throughout which causes the beading to break apart easily.

The Weverton Formation is part of the Chilhowee Group. This formation is found below the Harpers Formation and above the Loudon Formation and is around 1250 feet in thickness. This formation has lots of beds and layers of different types of rock throughout the formation. Different colors, such as gray and purple, and textures, such as vitreous and granular, of quartzite, can be found. Cross-bedded in the quartzite layers is conglomerate layers. White quartzite layers and shale beds between those layers can be found in many different layers.

The Loudon Formation is part of the Chilhowee Group. This formation is found below the Weverton formation and above the Catoctin Formation and is around 150–450 feet in thickness. This formation contains iron oxide, dark, phyllite along thin beds of arkosic quartzite and layers of conglomerate rock. Also contains layers of the matrix that contains blue and green slate as well as a conglomerate with quartz pebbles.

The Catoctin Formation found under the Chilhowee Group and above the basement rock(1.2-1.0 Ga) and is around 100–400 feet in thickness. Unconformities can be found between the Catoctin Formation and the Loudoun Formation as well as between the Catoctin Formation and the basement rock. This formation has metabasalts and metarhyolite as result of metamorphism. The metabasalts can also be seen paired with amygdalar layers and quartz, calcite, actinolite and epidote. The metarhyolite is seen with breccia and purple slate. Hornblende-calcite schist and greenstone are found folded and altered in the Catoctin Formation. The Basement Rock lays under all of the other rock formations and has an unconformity between it and the Catoctin Formation. The basement rock contains granite, anorthosite, quartz monzonite, syenite, and para-gneiss.

== Notable features ==
Many different types of features can be found throughout the Catoctin Formation. These features include columnar jointing, low-dipping joints, amygdules, sedimentary dikes, flow breccias, dikes of greenstone, and purple volcanic slate.

=== Structural features ===
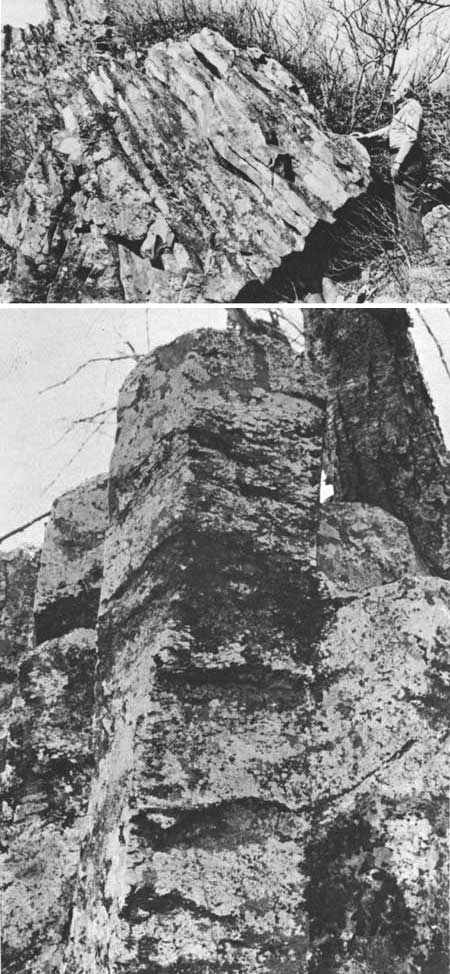
Columnar Jointing in the Catoctin Formation

==== Columnar jointing ====
Some columnar jointing is well preserved in the Catoctin Formation but most of it shows harsh columnar jointing. The well-preserved columnar jointing up to 20 feet tall and 1 foot in diameter. The harsh columnar jointing is shorter in height and can have a diameter of 2 to 3 feet. Most columnar jointing is parallel but some have a curved or random orientation.

Deformation can also be seen in the columnar jointing that is found within this formation. Columnar jointing that was originally perpendicular to the field now lies at an angle above the surface. Most columnar jointing is plunging to the south or south-east with some at an angle of 50° from original orientation.

==== Low-dipping primary joints ====
There are very low dipping joints which can give the formation a steep look. These low-dipping joints are associated with flow surfaces and can be used to determine attitude. This relationship is best seen at the top of flows compared to farther down the flow.

=== Volcanic features ===
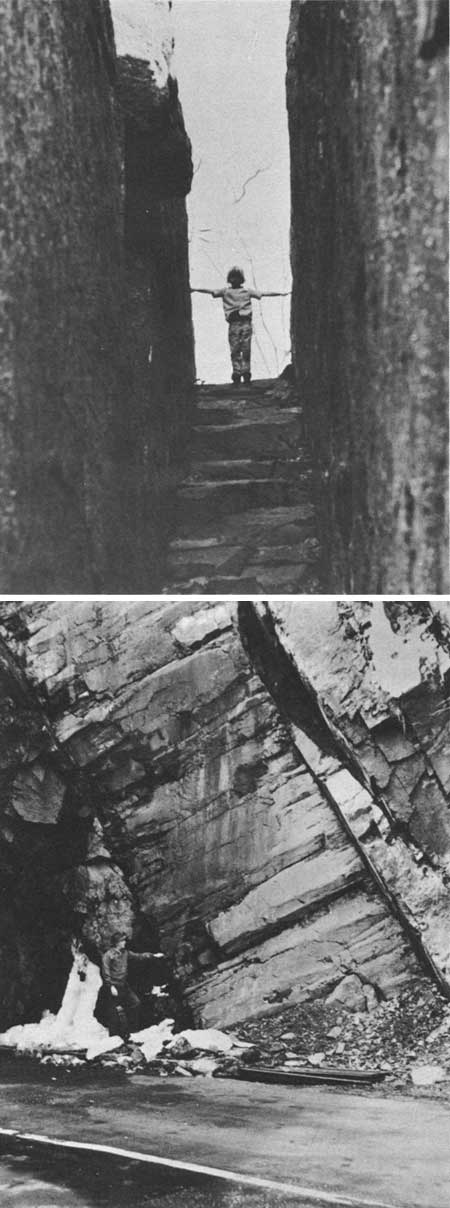
Greenstone dikes found through the Catoctin Formation

==== Dikes of greenstone ====
Dikes of greenstone as wide as 50 feet can be found cutting across the Catoctin Formation. These dikes of greenstone are made up of pyroxene and plagioclase with chlorite and small amounts of calcite, quartz, and epidote. Many of these dikes found in the formation have columnar jointing, faint cleavage, and are fine grained. Most of these dikes are also less durable to weathering and have a dip between 65° East and 65° West.

==== Purple volcanic slate ====
Purple volcanic slate can be found as a thin layer of purple, red, or brown slate that separates the Chilhowee Group and the Catoctin Formation. The slate has an average thickness of 50 to 100 feet and rests on top of the greenstone which suggests that it is younger than the greenstone, although this is debated. When placed under a microscope the rock shows original plagioclase that has been replaced with sericite and some darker opaque material. Also found throughout the rock are spots of green chlorite and crystals of sphene which are common in the rock.

=== Sedimentary features ===
==== Flow breccias ====
Two common breccias can be found in the Catoctin Formation, one is epidote-amygdaloid breccia and the other is mud-lump breccia. The epidote-amygdaloid breccia pieces of are in a matrix of quartz and epidote. Mud-lump breccia has pieces of paleosol with a quartz filling. Both breccias contain angular fragments, with the epidote-amygdaloid having some slightly round pieces and the mud-lump having sub-angular pieces.

==== Sedimentary dikes ====
Sedimentary dikes are found in the Catoctin Formation that interacts with the greenstone in a complex way. The sedimentary dikes are found to be about 3 inches in width and have sediment that is the result of overlying the lava flow. Other sedimentary dikes can be found at the base of flows that lead into the greenstone through a series of veins. These dikes are the result of lava flow over wet sediments, the steam pressure then forced the sediments up through cracks resulting in the modern-day dikes. Greenstone that is closer to the sedimentary dike is darker and has finer grains, greenstone that is further away is lighter and has coarser grains. The greenstone that is darker and finer is where glass started forming due to the high temperatures from lava that came in contact with the sediments.

=== Mineralogical features ===
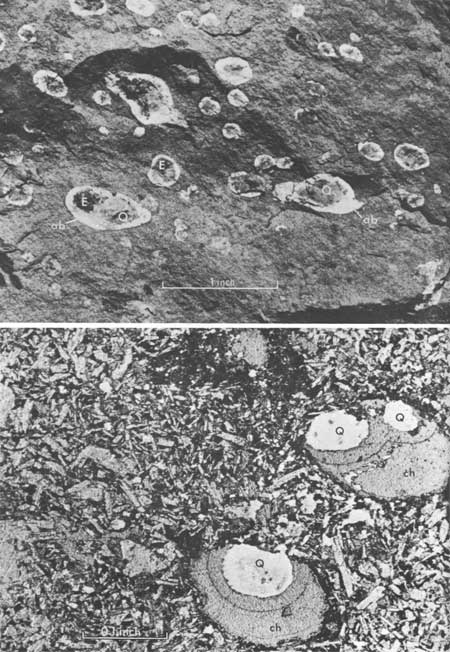
Amygdules found in Greenstone

==== Amygdules ====
Amygdules found in the greenstone of the Catoctin Formation are filled with quartz, epidote, albite, calcite, and chlorite. These minerals can occur by themselves or with other minerals. Epidote, quartz, and albite will usually occur together within lots of amygdules, chlorite and albite will also form together with albite forming on the rim and chlorite in the center. Amygdules are usually found in areas that are rich with other amygdules. They have an oval shape that has more round upper surfaces and longer bottoms parallel to jointing.

== Petrology and mineralogy ==
The Catoctin Formation is mostly fine grained and has a massive structure in most places except where it is slaty or mylonitic. Throughout the formation, there is quartz, feldspar, and epidote that come in the forms of veins and masses. Chlorite will obscure these veins in places where foliation and deformation have happened.

Catoctin hydrothermal alteration throughout the formation tends to be fine-grained but there are some places where clasts of feldspar have grown large and taken over most of the rock. Amygdules in the formation are usually elliptical and contain quartz, feldspar, and epidote mainly but also can contain hematite, chlorite, chalcopyrite, malachite, and zeolite. Hand specimens have found epidote and chlorite, with epidote appearing the most in rocks.

Catoctin rock has shown quartz, andesine, and orthoclase to be primary minerals. All of the feldspars have undergone alteration, the orthoclase forms tiny anhedral grains, and quartz forms small grains that are associated with secondary grains. Small grains of hornblende and pyroxene are also found where the pyroxene is associated with biotite.

=== Volcanic rocks ===
Columnar jointing in the Catoctin Formation Fine-grained greenstone is found throughout the Catoctin Formation and commonly has lineation in it. The greenstone also has amygdules that are elongated parallel to cleavage planes and thinner perpendicular to cleavage planes. Places with lots of amygdules are inferred to be old flow tops. Lots of minerals that are found in the matrix of Catoctin rocks show evidence of shearing, where greenstones don't show any evidence of shearing indicates that it is not original lava. Altered pyroxene in rocks indicates granular crystals or basaltic glass texture found filling the spaces between plagioclase.

== Structure and deformation ==
The Catoctin Formation has porphyritic flows and sedimentary members that can be found north of Rose River and have a slight dip direction to the south-east. To the west part of the Catoctin Formation is an eroded surface can be found that has up to 150 feet of sedimentary rocks at the base of the formation, to the east of the formation is a steep fault cuts off the formation. Two primary faults can be found from Hawksbill Gap to Cedar Run and through Franklin Cliffs to Rose River. Near Tanners Ridge, a gradual anticline can be seen in the Catoctin Formation. The top of Chapman Mountain contains sedimentary rocks that belong to the Chilhowee Group, just below those rocks are 50–150 feet of volcanic slate that belongs to the Catoctin Formation. Large greenstone dikes can be found all through the formation particularly at the Big Meadows area where a 1,800-foot section of greenstone is exposed. Throughout the areas, cleavage strikes to the north and dips to the east and lineation that plunges east of southeast.

Four major deformation events took place after the emplacement of the formation in the Precambrian. The burial of the formation occurred between 550 million years ago to 430 million years ago. Neoacadian Orogeny at 375 Ma occurred which caused deformation and metamorphism to the Catoctin Formation. Around 300 million years ago, after the cooling of the Catoctin Formation, a thrust fault cut across the formation. The last big deformation event came from Atlantic rifting that lead to fracturing within the Catoctin Formation around 200 million years ago. Erosion of the Catoctin Formation continues to happen as it is exposed to different forms of weathering.

== Sedimentology ==
Sediments found at the base of the formation are poorly sorted rocks that contain arkoses, conglomerates, and graywackes. Arkosic sediments and phyllites are where the sediment is thinner, conglomerates and graywackes are usually in thicker areas. Arkosic sediments have angular to sub-rounded grains that have very little matrix made up of epidote in between grains of quartz and feldspar. Conglomerates contain small amounts of greenstone and phyllite with pebbles of cobbles of quartz. Graywackes have a bigger matrix, made up of sericite and chlorite, compared to arkosic rocks, making up 20-50% of the rock. The graywackes contain quartz and feldspar in angular to sub-rounded sediments.

The bottom of the Catoctin Formation in other places shows a much larger accumulation of sediments such as the ones found near the head of Hawksbill Creek where the rocks are around 100 feet thick. Sedimentary rocks found here is graywackes, phyllites, and argillites. The argillite found in this area is finely laminated and interbedded in the other rock layers, it can be seen going upward from a layer of coarse sandstone to a layer of dark argillite.

Many places in the Catoctin Formation contain unknown sediments at the base of the formation. Graywackes and metamorphosed gneiss are seen in the sedimentary rocks at the base of the formation. These graywackes and gneiss contain angular grains are quartz and feldspar can be found in the gneiss with a matrix of chlorite and sericite. Farther below the metamorphosed gneiss contains more large quartz and feldspar with little matrix.
