= Alexander Lindsay =

Alexander or Alex Lindsay may refer to:

== Scottish nobles ==
- Alexander Lindsay of Barnweill (before 1279–ca. 1309), son of David de Lindsay of the Byres
- Alexander Lindsay of Glenesk (before 1350–1381), knight renowned in Wars of Scottish Independence
- Alexander Lindsay, 2nd Earl of Crawford (1387–1438), son of David Lindsay, 1st Earl of Crawford and Elizabeth Stewart, daughter of Robert II
- Alexander Lindsay, 4th Earl of Crawford (before 1425–1453), the Tiger Earl; participated in Douglas rebellion against James II
- Alexander Lindsay, 1st Lord Spynie (ca. 1564–1607), son of David Lindsay, 10th Earl of Crawford; Privy Counsellor
- Alexander Lindsay, 2nd Lord Spynie (ca. 1597–1646), son of 1st Lord Spynie; fought in Thirty Years' War in the service of Christian IV of Denmark
- Alexander Lindsay, 1st Earl of Balcarres (1618–1659), son of David Lindsay, 1st Lord Balcarres; Covenanter, Engager, MP, Exchequer and Earl
- Alexander Lindsay, 4th Earl of Balcarres (before 1695–1736), son of Colin Lindsay, 3rd Earl of Balcarres; captain in Lord Orkney's regiment; representative peer of Scotland
- Alexander Lindsay, 6th Earl of Balcarres (1752–1825), son of James Lindsay, 5th Earl of Balcarres; major in American Revolution; governor of Jersey and Jamaica
- Alexander Lindsay, 25th Earl of Crawford (1812–1880), son of James Lindsay, 24th Earl of Crawford; art historian, genealogist and book collector
- Alexander Edward David Lindsay, 27th Earl of Crawford (1871–1940), son of James Lindsay, 26th Earl of Crawford and 9th Earl of Balcarres; art collector; Conservative MP
- Alexander Dunlop Lindsay, 1st Baron Lindsay of Birker (1879–1952), academic, moral philosopher
- Alexander Robert David Lindsay, 28th Earl of Crawford (1900–1975), Unionist MP for Lonsdale; Lord Balniel 1913–1940; Knight Grand Cross for services to the Arts
- Sir Alexander Martin Lindsay, 1st Baronet (1905–1981), army officer and leader of Greenland expeditions; Conservative MP for Solihull; chronicler
- Alexander Robert Lindsay, 29th Earl of Crawford (1927–2023), Conservative MP for Hertford; Lord Balniel; Premier Earl of Scotland and hereditary Clan Chief of Clan Lindsay

== Heraldic officials ==
- Alexander William Lindsay (1846–1926), English heraldic official; officer of arms at College of Arms; Clarenceux King of Arms
- Alexander Roger Lindsay (born 1957), Scottish-Canadian heraldic official; Aide-de-Camp to Lt Governor of Ontario and Rouge Herald of Arms Extraordinary

== Sportspeople ==
- Alexander Lindsay (cricketer)(1883–1941), Scottish first-class cricketer and merchant
- Alex Lindsay (footballer) (1896–1971), Scottish centre forward
- Alexander Lindsay (rower) (born 1936), British Olympic rower
- Alec Lindsay or Alexander Lindsay (born 1948), English footballer

== Others ==
- Alexander Lindsay of Evelick (bishop) (1561–1639), Scottish minister, Bishop of Dunkeld
- Alexander Lindsay (East India Company officer) (1785–1872)
- Alexander Lindsay (entrepreneur) (1841–1920), Scottish-American co-founder of Sibley, Lindsay and Curr department store
- Alex Lindsay (violinist) (1919–1974), New Zealand violinist, conductor and orchestra leader
- Alex Lindsay (podcaster) (born 1970), founder of the Pixel Corps

== See also ==
- Clan Lindsay
- Lindsay (name)
