= Infill (disambiguation) =

Infill is the rededication of land in an urban environment, usually open space, to new construction.

Infill may also refer to:

- Infill (construction), the process of leveling up a depressed surface, or the material used in that process
- infill another term for the rubble used in construction of core-and-veneer walls
- Infill (geology), the sedimentary process of filling a basin or channel, or the resultant rocks
- Infill (petrology), the creation of amygdules, or the resultant minerals
