= Swift Run Formation =

Geologic formation in the United States

- Stratigraphic range: Neoproterozoic
- Type: Formation
- Underlies: Catoctin Formation

Location
- Country: United States
- Extent: Ohio, Virginia and West Virginia

The Swift Run Formation is a geologic formation in Virginia and West Virginia. It dates back to the Neoproterozoic.
