= Henry Guthrie =

Scottish historian and cleric

Henry Guthrie (c. 1600 – 1676) was a Scottish historian and cleric who served as the Bishop of Dunkeld from 1665 to 1676.

== Life ==
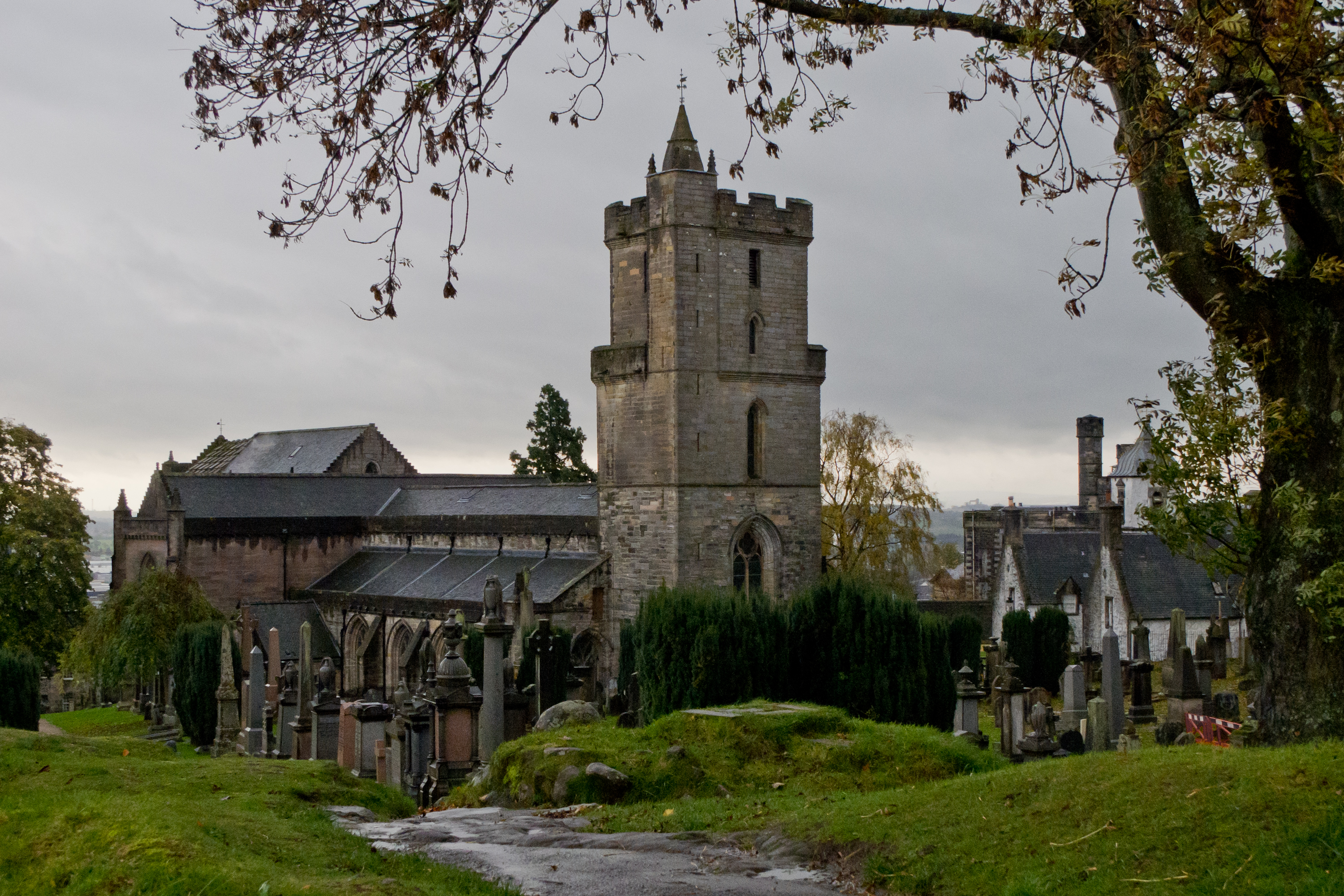
Church of the Holy rood in Stirling

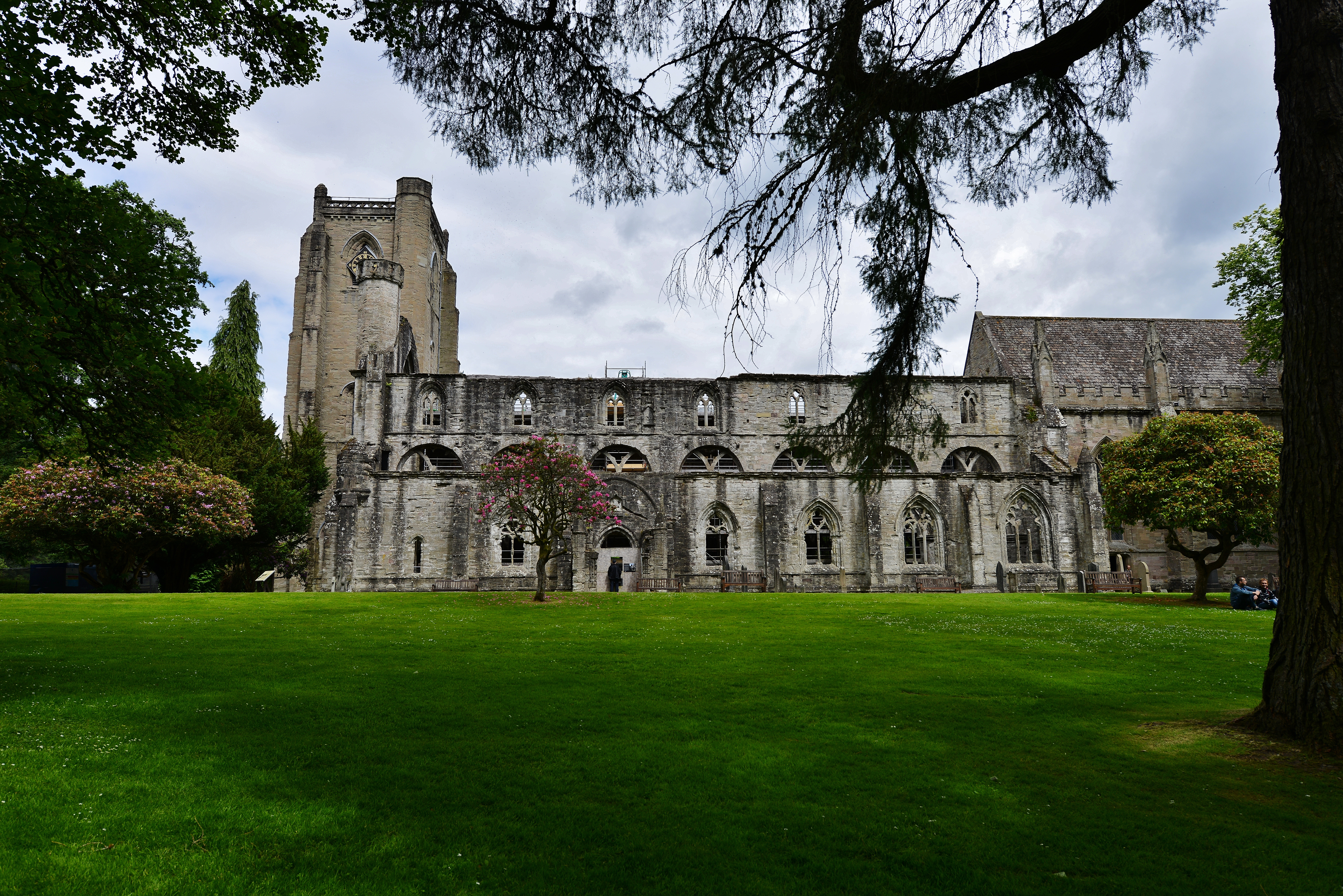
Dunkeld Cathedral

The son of Elizabeth Small and the Perthshire minister Henry Guthrie, he was born around 1600 in Coupar Angus, a town in central Scotland, in the modern region of Perth and Kinross. He graduated from the University of St Andrews in 1621, studying theology. He later served as a chaplain to the family of the Earl of Mar.

He became minister of Guthrie in 1624, and was promoted by King Charles I to the Church of the Holy Rude, Stirling in 1632. He took an ambiguous role in the Covenanter Wars and the Wars of the Three Kingdoms. On 3 October, 1641, he preached before the king at the abbey church of Edinburgh.

During the time of the "Engagement" in 1647, Guthrie was deposed from his Stirling charge by the General Assembly. In 1656, he was readmitted to the ministry, being given Kilspindie. Despite once opposing the re-establishment of episcopacy, abandoned since the National Covenant of 1638, he changed his position, and later after the episcopate of George Haliburton, became Bishop of Dunkeld, to which position he was consecrated on 24 August 1665. He held this position until his death in 1676.

Guthrie is best remembered for his memoirs. He also wrote and left to posterity, his Observations. Although circulating in his own day, they were not formally published until 1702. Three notebooks of his Observations are held at the University of Edinburgh.

== Notes ==
- Anderson, William (1877). "Guthrie, Henry". The Scottish nation: or, The surnames, families, literature, honours, and biographical history of the people of Scotland. Vol. 2. A. Fullarton & co. p. 387-388. This article incorporates text from this source, which is in the public domain.
- Chambers, Robert; Thomson, Thomas (1857). A biographical dictionary of eminent Scotsmen. New ed., rev. under the care of the publishers. With a supplementary volume, continuing the biographies to the present time. Vol. 4. Glasgow: Blackie. pp. 551-553. This article incorporates text from this source, which is in the public domain.
- Henderson, Thomas Finlayson (1890). "Guthrie, Henry" . In Stephen, Leslie; Lee, Sidney (eds.). Dictionary of National Biography. Vol. 23. London: Smith, Elder & Co. p. 376. This article incorporates text from this source, which is in the public domain.
- Scott, Hew (1923). Fasti ecclesiae scoticanae; the succession of ministers in the Church of Scotland from the reformation. Vol. 4. Edinburgh: Oliver and Boyd. pp. 318, 214. This article incorporates text from this source, which is in the public domain.
- Stevenson, David, "Guthrie, Henry (1600?–1676)", in the Oxford Dictionary of National Biography, Oxford University Press, 2004, retrieved 20 Feb 2007]

== Sources ==
- Memoir by George Crawfurd prefixed to Memoirs;
- Hew Scott's Fasti Ecclesiae Scoticanae;
- Guthrie's Memoirs;
- Gordon's Scots Affairs (Spalding Club);
- Robert Baillie's Letters and Journals (Bannatyne Club);
- Nimmo's Hist. of Stirlingshire;
- Keith's Scottish Bishops.

Religious titles
| Preceded by George Haliburton | Bishop of Dunkeld; 1665–1676 | Succeeded by William Lindsay |
