= George Haliburton (bishop of Dunkeld) =

- Bishop of Dunkeld
- Church: Church of Scotland
- See: Diocese of Dunkeld
- In office: 1662–1665
- Predecessor: Alexander Lindsay
- Successor: Henry Guthrie
- Previous post: Minister of Perth

Orders
- Ordination: N/A
- Consecration: 7 May 1662, Holyrood Palace

Personal details
- Born: 1616 Glenisla, Angus
- Died: 5 April 1665 (aged 48–49) Perth, Scotland

George Haliburton (1616–1665) was a 17th-century Scottish minister who served as Bishop of Dunkeld.

== Life ==
The son of Janet Ogilvie, and her husband, George Haliburton, George was born in Glenisla, Angus, where his father was a minister.

In 1636, he graduated MA from King's College, Aberdeen, thereafter receiving his licence for the ministry from Meigle presbytery. He served as an army chaplain in 1640 and 1641, before being appointed minister of Menmuir in November 1642.

From 1 August 1644, he was "second charge" minister of Perth. He was briefly deposed (1644–1645) for saying a blessing while dining with the Marquess of Montrose. In July 1649 he was placed in "first charge" of Perth.

After the reinstatement of episcopacy in 1662, James Sharp, Archbishop of St Andrews recommended him for the bishopric of Dunkeld. He was consecrated Bishop of Dunkeld, on 7 May 1662, at Holyrood Palace, retaining his parochial position in Perth.

He died in Perth on 5 April 1665 and was buried in the Greyfriars Burial Ground.

== Family ==
In 1643 he married Catherine Lindsay (d.1669), the daughter of the late David Lindsay, Bishop of Edinburgh. Their five children included James Haliburton of Wattriebutts (d.1699).

Vacant Title last held by Alexander Lindsay	Bishop of Dunkeld; 1662–1665	Succeeded by Henry Guthrie
