= James Noble (geologist) =

James Noble (1800–1848) was a 19th century Scottish minister, antiquarian, geologist and fossil collector.

In relation to his fossil hunting, Hugh Miller called him " a gentleman who, by devoting his leisure hours to geology, has extended the knowledge of this upper formation, and whose name has been attached by Agassiz to its characteristic fossil, now designated as Holoptychus Nobilissimus".

== Life ==
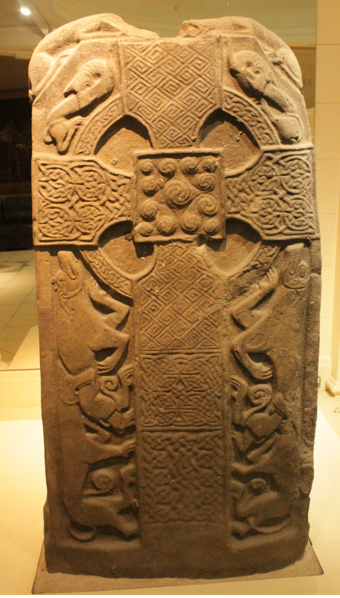
The St Madoes Pictish Stone

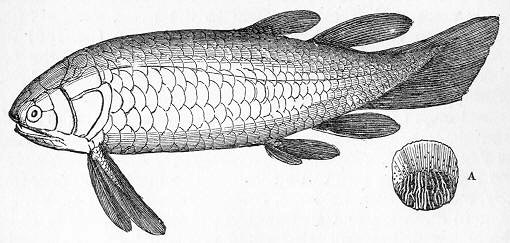
Holoptychus Nobilissimus

He was born in New Deer in Aberdeenshire the son of Charles Noble. He was educated locally then studied at Aberdeen University where he graduated MA in 1818. In March 1822 he was licensed to preach as a Church of Scotland minister by the Presbytery of Deer.

In December 1828 he was ordained as minister of St Madoes under patronage of John Richardson of Pitfour. Exploring the churchyard of St Madoes his eye was drawn to a curious fallen stone. He communicated with the Royal Society of Edinburgh who sent their museum curator, James Skene to investigate and Skene presented a paper to the RSE on this Pictish stone in 1830.

A friend or acquaintance of Hugh Miller, Miller stated to the RSE that Rev James Noble had discovered, while fossil hunting in 1838/9, "an almost entire specimen of Gyrolepis" ( a large carnivorous fish from the Triassic period) in the layered sandstones of Clashbenny quarry serving Clashbenny Farm. Noble corresponded with Hugh Miller and Agassiz on his discovery and the latter named this new species in honour of Noble in 1839. A favourite spot, he also recorded the Clashbenny Standing Stone which is now a Scheduled Ancient Monument.

In 1839 he discovered a new sub-species of Barley (of the "Dunlop" variety) and over three years bred this to a quantity capable of commercial use, and was first used commercially by James Rannie of Inchyra House.

In 1843 he attended the Synod of Perth and Stirling.

Rev Noble died in St Madoes manse on 4 December 1848 and was buried in the adjacent churchyard, close to his beloved Pictish stone. He was succeeded by Rev John Ross MacDuff.

== The St Madoes Stone ==
Only after Noble's death was the stone set upright (as was believed its correct position) being placed on a foundation in its original location in 1853 by a T S Muir. It was moved to a position close to the church entrance in the 1920s and moved to its current location in Perth Museum in the 1990s.

== Family ==
In October 1829 he married Margaret Crow (d. 1884) eldest daughter of James Crow. They had several children:

- Marjory Baillie Noble (1830-1922)
- Barbara Ann Noble (b. 1833)
- Rev James Noble (b. 1835), minister of Castleton, Angus
- Charlotte Crawford Noble (1837-1915)
- Susan Crow Noble (1841-1890) married Rev James Patterson (1840-1906) minister of Ancrum

== Publications ==
- On a New Variety of Barley (1838 paper to the Highland Society)
- The Old Red Sandstone
- Statistical Account of the Parish of St Madoes (1845)
