= Jim Noble =

Jim Noble may refer to:

== People ==
- Jim Noble (screenwriter), see List of K-9 episodes
- Jim Noble (racing driver), see 1988 American Racing Series season
- Jim Noble (pit reporter), NASCAR pit reporter for the Performance Racing Network and ESPN
- Jim Noble (American football), see List of Buffalo Bisons (NFL) players

== Fictional characters ==
- Jim Noble, character in Redemption (1990 novel)
- Jimmy Noble, character in Day of the Evil Gun

== See also ==
- James Noble (disambiguation)
