= Antietam Formation =

Geologic formation in the United States

- Stratigraphic range: Cambrian Stage 3
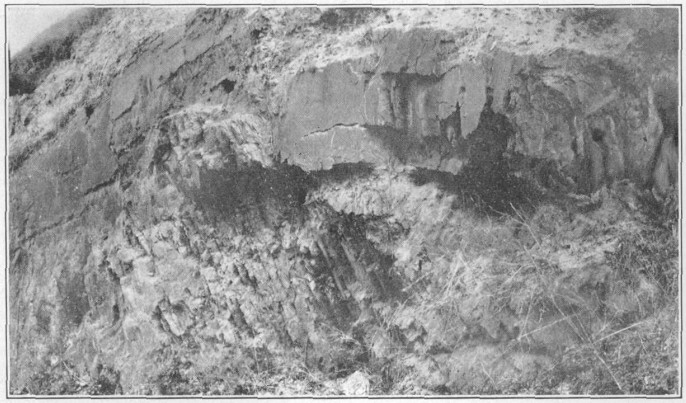
- Anticline in schist of Antietam Formation
- Type: Formation
- Unit of: Chilhowee Group
- Underlies: Tomstown Dolomite
- Overlies: Harpers Formation
- Thickness: 550 ft

Lithology
- Primary: Sandstone, quartzite
- Other: Schist

Location
- Region: Appalachia, Eastern United States, and Southeastern United States
- Country: United States
- Extent: Maryland, Pennsylvania, West Virginia, Virginia, and Tennessee

Type section
- Named for: Antietam Creek

The Antietam Formation or Antietam Sandstone is a geologic formation in Pennsylvania, Maryland, West Virginia, Virginia, and Tennessee.. In Virginia and Tennessee, it is known as the Erwin Formation. It is largely quartz sandstone with some quartzite and quartz schist. It preserves Skolithos trace fossils dating back to the Cambrian Period. A nevadiid specimen from Tennessee is the earliest known definitive trilobite in the southern Appalachians.

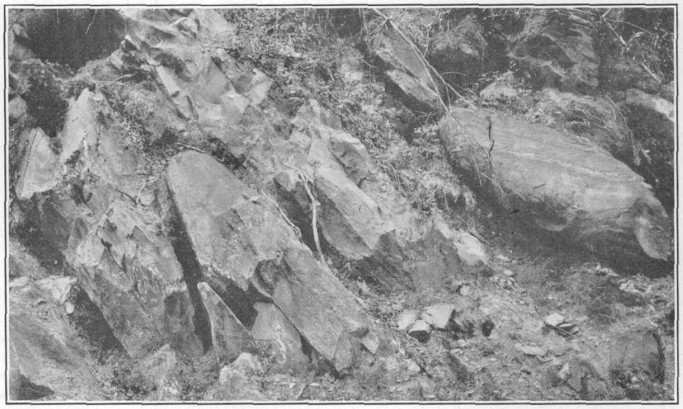
Tight folds in the schist of Antietam Formation

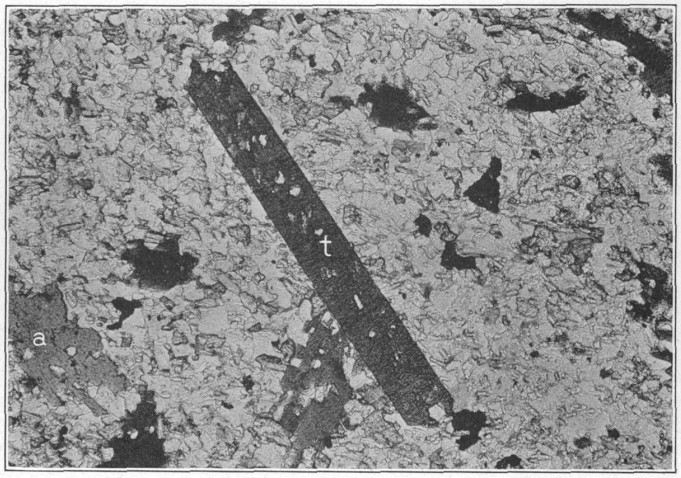
Thin section of schist. Porphyroblastic biotite, a, in a dolomitic matrix. The tourmaline, t, is epigenetic.
