= Ledger Formation =

Geologic formation in Pennsylvania, United States

- Stratigraphic range: Cambrian
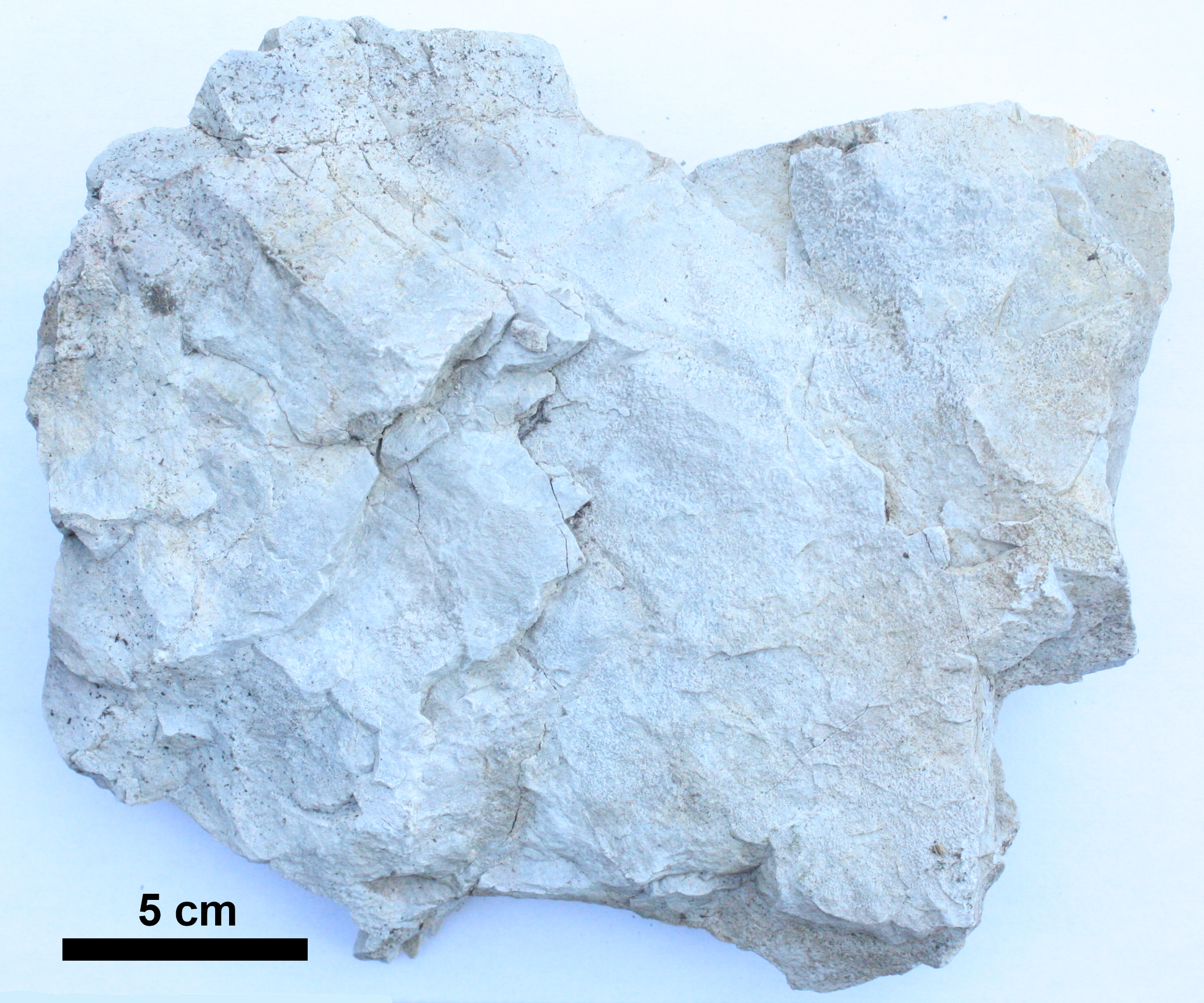
- Sample of Ledger Formation from West York, Pennsylvania
- Type: Formation
- Sub-units: Lower dolomite member, Willis Run Member, upper dolomite member
- Overlies: Kinzers Formation

Lithology
- Primary: dolomite

Location
- Region: Pennsylvania
- Country: United States
- Extent: Pennsylvania, Maryland, Virginia

Type section
- Named by: Stose, G.W., and Jonas, A.I.

The Ledger Formation or Ledger Dolomite is a geologic formation in Pennsylvania, United States.

The Ledger is described as light-gray, locally mottled, massive, pure, coarsely crystalline dolomite. It may be siliceous in the middle part.

== Type section ==
Named from exposures at Ledger, Pennsylvania, formerly 3 miles northeast of Kinzers, Lancaster County, Pennsylvania.

== Other outcrops ==
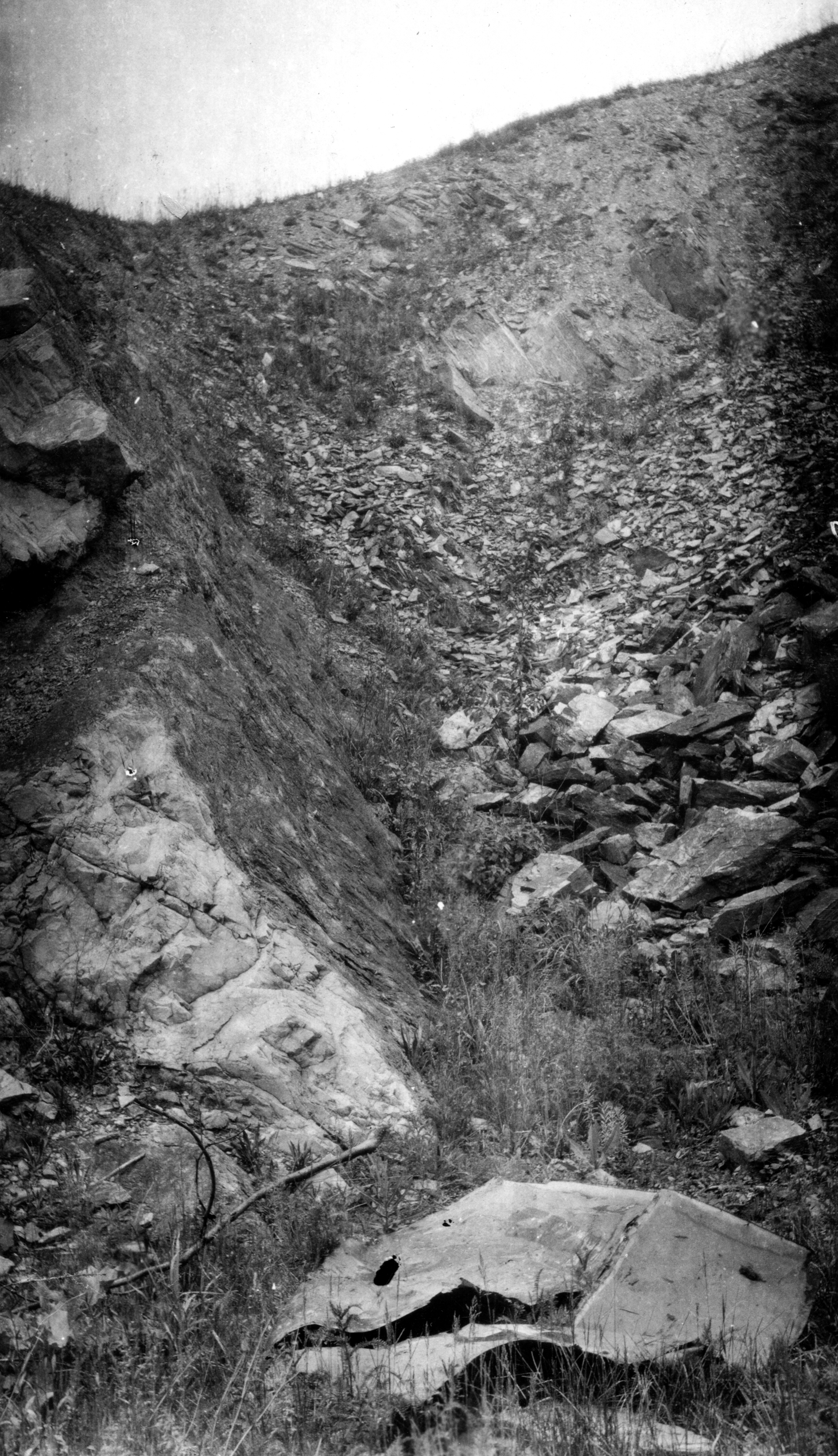
Harpers Formation thrust northwestward over Ledger Formation at left, Pottery Hill, southwest of York, in 1930

At Valley Forge National Historical Park, the visitor center parking lot is built within an old quarry of the Ledger, and the former quarry walls are exposed. The rocks contain stromatolites. In the nearby Port Kennedy Quarry, the Triassic Stockton Formation unconformably overlies the folded Ledger.

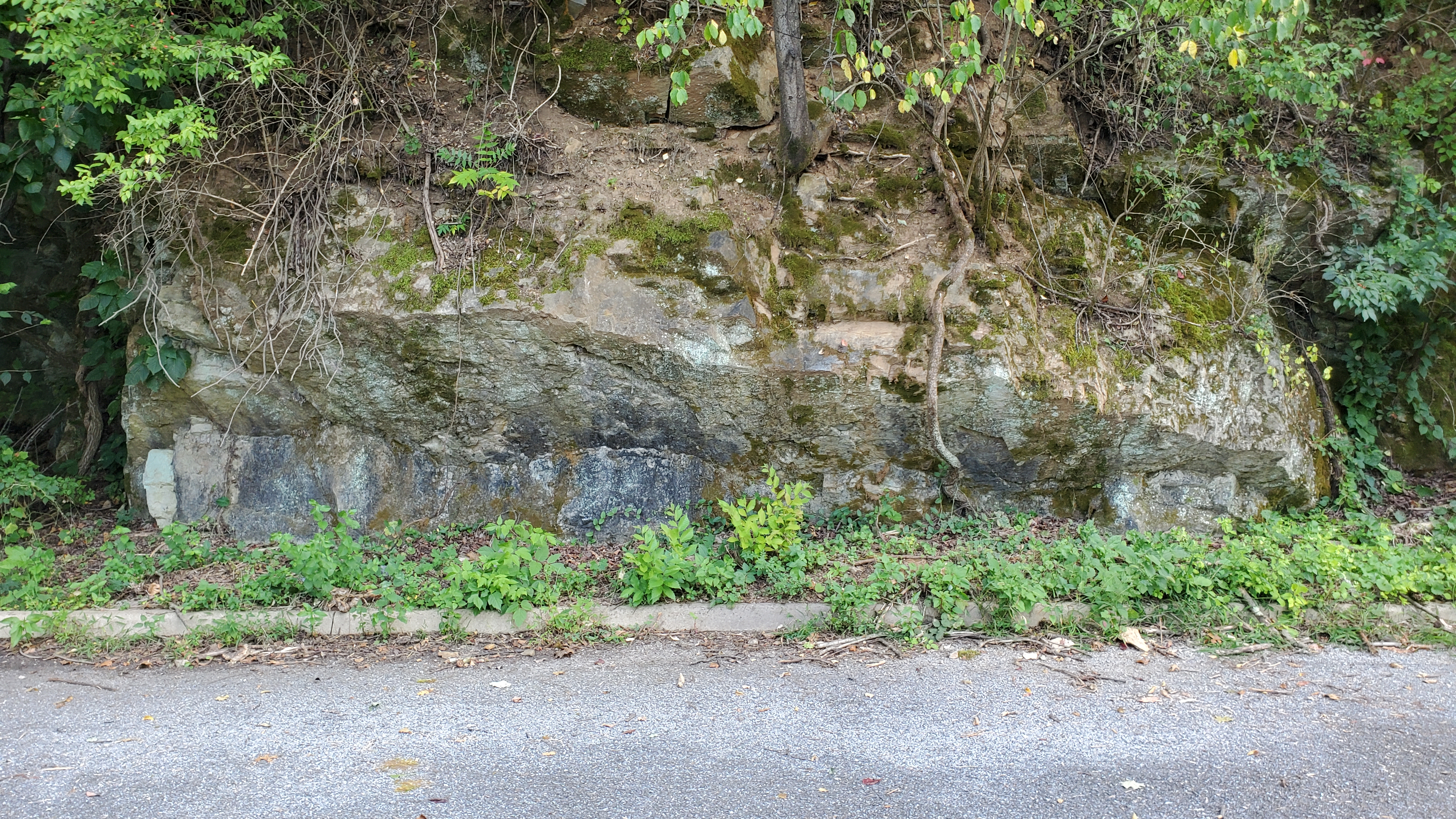
Outcrop at Valley Forge

The Harpers Formation overlies the Ledger Formation due to a thrust fault in small roadside quarry (currently overgrown) on Pottery Hill, southwest of York, as shown in the historical photo at left.

The Ledger is exposed at a roadcut on the south side of Route 30 at the interchange with Route 23 (East Walnut Street) on the northeast side of Lancaster.

== Quarries ==
The quarry currently operated by Vulcan Materials Company in Edgegrove, Pennsylvania (west of Hanover) primarily mines the Ledger Formation for aggregate.
