= St Madoes =

Coordinates: 56.375335°N 3.303373°W

St Madoes: Scottish Gaelic: Cill M'Aodhaig
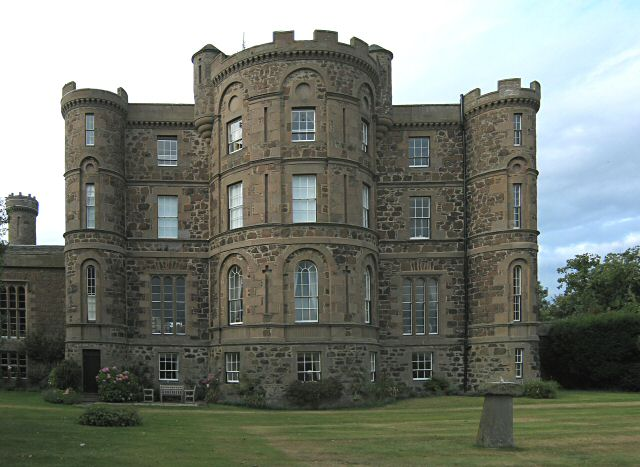
- Pitfour Castle, St Madoes, designed by Robert Adam, 1764

- Location within Perth and Kinross
- Population: 1,110 (2020)
- OS grid reference: NO196211
  - Edinburgh: 47 mi (76 km)
  - London: 364 mi (586 km)
- Council area: Perth and Kinross
- Lieutenancy area: Perth and Kinross
- Country: Scotland
- Sovereign state: United Kingdom
- Post town: PERTH
- Postcode district: PH2
- Dialling code: 01738
- Police: Scotland
- Fire: Scottish
- Ambulance: Scottish
- Scottish Parliament: Perthshire North; North East Scotland

St Madoes (/ˈmeɪdoʊz/, Scottish Gaelic: Cill M'Aodhaig) is a village in the Carse of Gowrie, Scotland. It was developed near Pitfour Castle. It is believed that there have been settlements since around 1000 AD based on discoveries of several standing stones and the St Madoes stone, a well-preserved Pictish cross.

Local amenities at St Madoes include a small shop, two parks, a primary school and an 18th-century church built upon the remains of an earlier church. It is believed the original drawings for the church were done by the architect Robert Adam (1728-1792); the design and layout are very similar to the only other known Robert Adam country kirk (Kirkoswald near Culzean Castle) with the most noted similarity being the gallery (or Laird's Loft) on the back wall, facing the central pulpit. Adam also designed Pitfour Castle. Both buildings were funded by the laird John Richardson (1760-1821), a wealthy local man involved with the salmon fisheries of the Tay.

Recently the village has started expanding due to the building of a large housing estate.

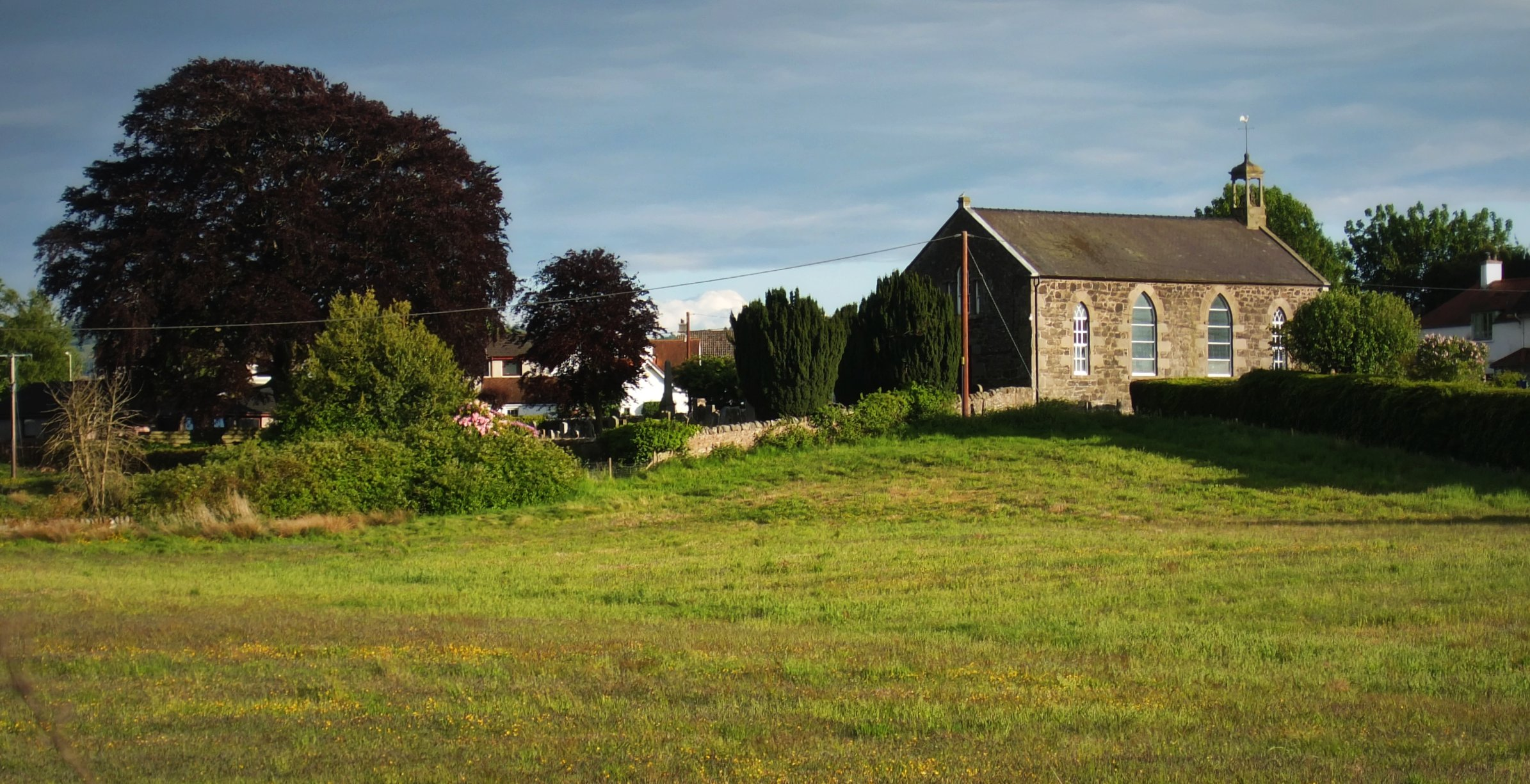
St Madoes Church

It is located near Errol, between Dundee and Perth.

== Notable residents ==
- Alexander Lindsay of Evelick, bishop of Dunkeld 1607–1638
- James Noble, minister of the parish 1828-1848, noted geologist
- Alfred ("Alf") Smith (1908-2019), Scotland's oldest man, died aged 111

== See also ==
- Frederick Millar, 1st Baron Inchyra
