= James Nicolson (bishop) =

James Nicolson (1557–1607) was Bishop of Dunkeld in 1607.

== Life ==
He was born in Cupar in central Fife in 1557 the second son of James Nicolson, a local burgess, and his wife, Margaret Philip. He spent most of his life in north Perthshire. He was ordained as minister of Cortachy in 1580 and translated to Meigle parish church in 1583 and demitted this post in April 1607 when he was appointed Bishop of Dunkeld.

He received a grant of a pension of £60 per annum on 6 February 1571, from Robert, Bishop of Caithness, payable from the Priory of St Andrews, "becaus he hes bene twyis schorne of the stane, and is continewallie vexit with that infirmitie". He was a prominent man in the Church of Scotland soon after the Reformation, and was minister of Cortachy in 1580, and Meigle in 1583.

He was selected by the General Assembly to sit in conference regarding stipends in 1592, 1596, 1606, and 1607, was appointed Bishop of Dunkeld on 23 April 1607.

== Death ==
Nicolson died of a "heavy melancholy" on 17 August 1607. When he died, Alexander Lindsay, was appointed to fill his place.

== Family ==
He married Jane, daughter of Gilbert Ramsay of Banff. Their daughter, Margaret, married Bishop William Lindsay.

== Sources ==
- "Bayanne House". THE COUNTY FAMILIES OF THE SHETLAND ISLANDS.
- Grant, Frances J (1893). THE COUNTY FAMILIES OF THE SHETLAND ISLANDS.
- Watt, D.E.R. & Shead, N.F. (eds.), The Heads of Religious Houses in Scotland from the 12th to the 16th Centuries, The Scottish Records Society, New Series, Volume 24, (Edinburgh, 2001)

Religious titles
Preceded by Peter Rollock	Bishop of Dunkeld; 1607	Succeeded by Alexander Lindsay
