= Tomstown Dolomite =

Fossiliferous statigraphic unit

- Stratigraphic range: Cambrian
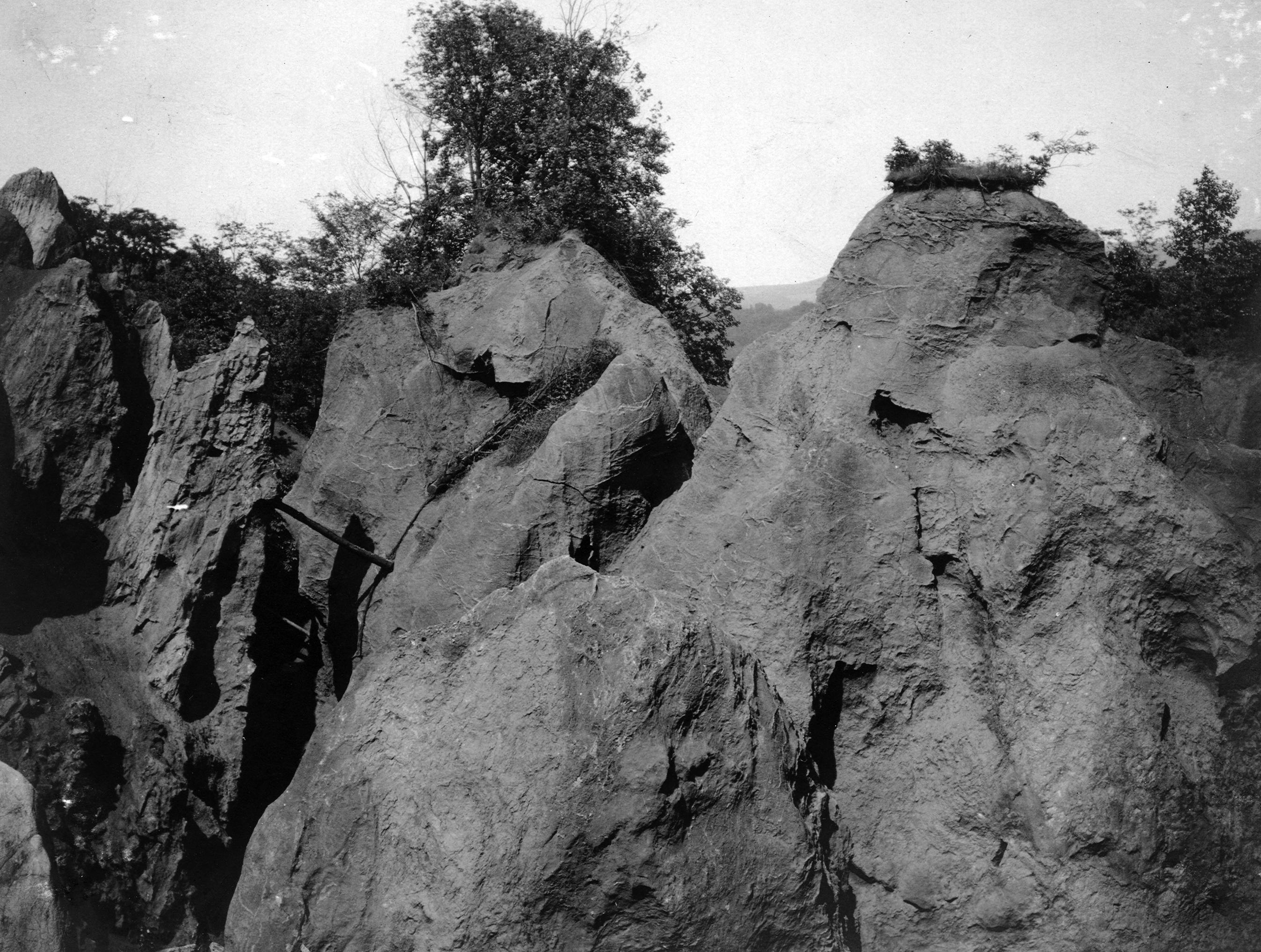
- USGS photo 1 mile east of Bakerton, West Virginia
- Type: Sedimentary
- Underlies: Rome Group and Waynesboro Formation
- Overlies: Antietam Formation and Chilhowee Group
- Thickness: 200 - 1000 feet

Lithology
- Primary: dolomite
- Other: Chert, limestone, shale

Location
- Region: Appalachia, Mid-Atlantic United States, and Southeastern United States
- Country: United States
- Extent: Maryland, Pennsylvania, Virginia, West Virginia

The Tomstown Dolomite or Tomstown Formation is a geologic formation in Maryland, Pennsylvania, Virginia and West Virginia. It preserves fossils dating to the Cambrian Period.

In Maryland it is described as "Interbedded light gray to yellowish-gray, thin- to thick-bedded dolomite and limestone; some shale layers; gradational contact with Antietam; thickness 200 to 1,000 feet."

In southern Maryland it is divided into four members:

Dargan Member Interbedded and cyclical dolomite and limestone.
Benevola Member Light gray to white, massive to poorly bedded, highly fractured sugary dolomite.
Fort Duncan Member Medium- to dark-gray, thick bedded, mottled dolomite with white, void-filling sparry dolomite.
Bolivar Heights Member Three lithologies from the basal layer of a tan, vuggy dolomite, to a light gray dolomitic marble called the Keedysville bed, to thin- to medium bedded layers of lime mudstone containing burrows.

== See also ==
- List of fossiliferous stratigraphic units in Maryland
- List of fossiliferous stratigraphic units in Pennsylvania
- List of fossiliferous stratigraphic units in Virginia
- List of fossiliferous stratigraphic units in West Virginia
