= St. Peter's Roman Catholic Church (Harpers Ferry, West Virginia) =

Historic church in West Virginia, United States

- U.S. National Register of Historic Places
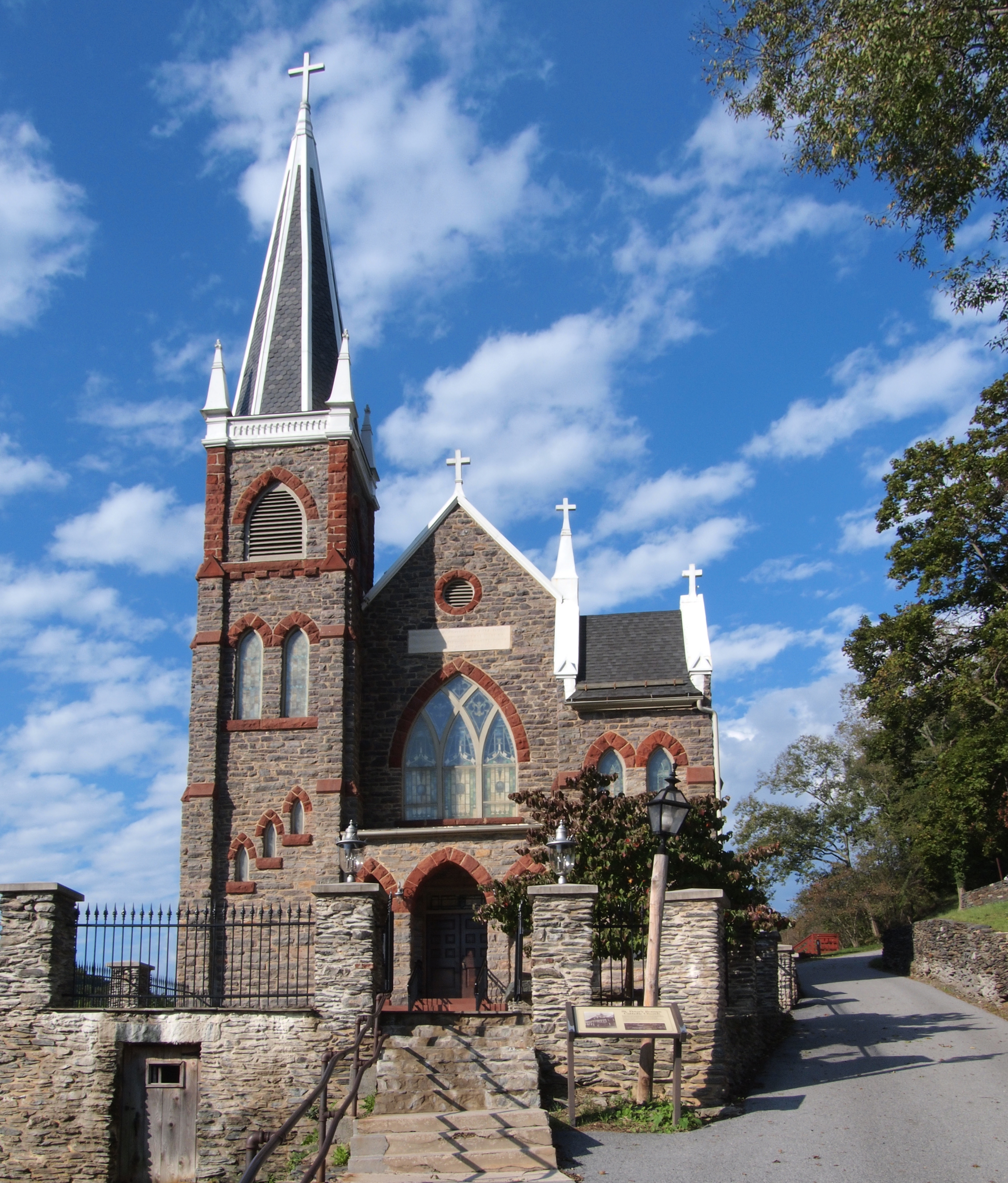
- (Photograph, Sept 2011)

- Location within West Virginia Location within the United States
- Location: Harpers Ferry, West Virginia
- Coordinates: 39°19′22″N 77°43′53″W
- Built: 1833
- Architects: The architect of the major change to the church in 1896 was Thomas J. Collins, best known for his major work in the town of Staunton, VA.
- Architectural style: Late Gothic Revival
- NRHP reference No.: 73001915
- Added to NRHP: March 30, 1973

St. Peter's Roman Catholic Church in Harpers Ferry, West Virginia occupies a prominent location on the heights above Harpers Ferry. The original church was built in 1833 in a pseudo-Gothic style which it kept through the Civil War, being the only church in Harpers Ferry to escape destruction during the war. The church was extensively altered in 1896 in the then-popular Neo-Gothic style to produce the church seen today. The church commands a sweeping vista across the gorge of the Shenandoah River above its confluence with the Potomac River. The street along the side of the church building is part of the Appalachian Trail. A short trail leads from the church to Jefferson Rock. St. Peter's Church is a mission church of St. James in Charles Town. Mass is offered at the historic church every Sunday at 9:30 a.m with confession immediately before Mass.

== History ==
The 1831 church was dedicated in 1833, to some extent resembling reduced St. Mary's Seminary Chapel in Baltimore, Maryland as an early Gothic Revival church. The 1896 remodeling by architects Thomas J. Collins and Son was extensive in scope, completely changing the church into a stone-clad Victorian Gothic structure, resembling the architects' St. Francis Roman Catholic Church in Staunton, Virginia.

Irish immigrants settled in Harpers Ferry during the construction of the Chesapeake and Ohio Canal and the Baltimore and Ohio Railroad. The majority of the Irish immigrants were Roman Catholics and attended mass at St. Peter's.

== Description ==
The rebuilt church is an elaborately detailed Victorian Gothic structure. The exterior is finished in gray stone with red sandstone trim. The tall spire stands at the edge of the cliff overlooking the Shenandoah River. The interior is a single, bright room. Aisles are suggested by suspended vaulting with gilded pendants. The lancet windows are mainly furnished with colored glass rather than figurative representations. The sanctuary is marked by a polygonal apse.

== Gallery ==
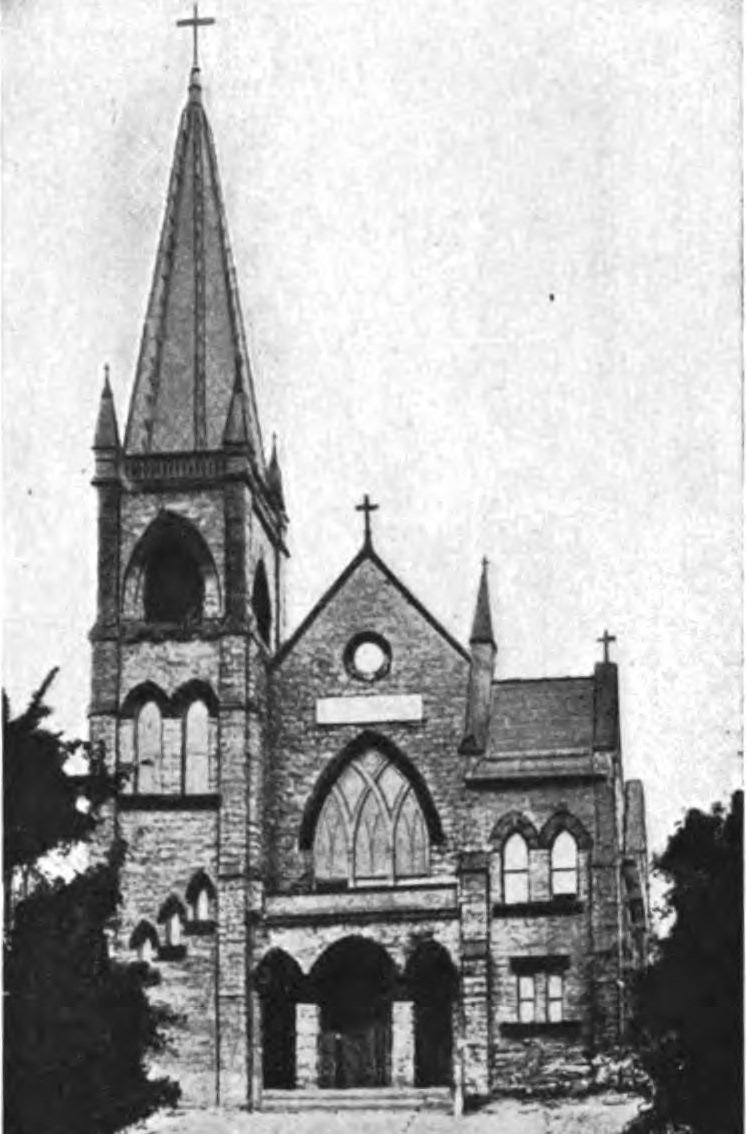
A historic photograph of the church

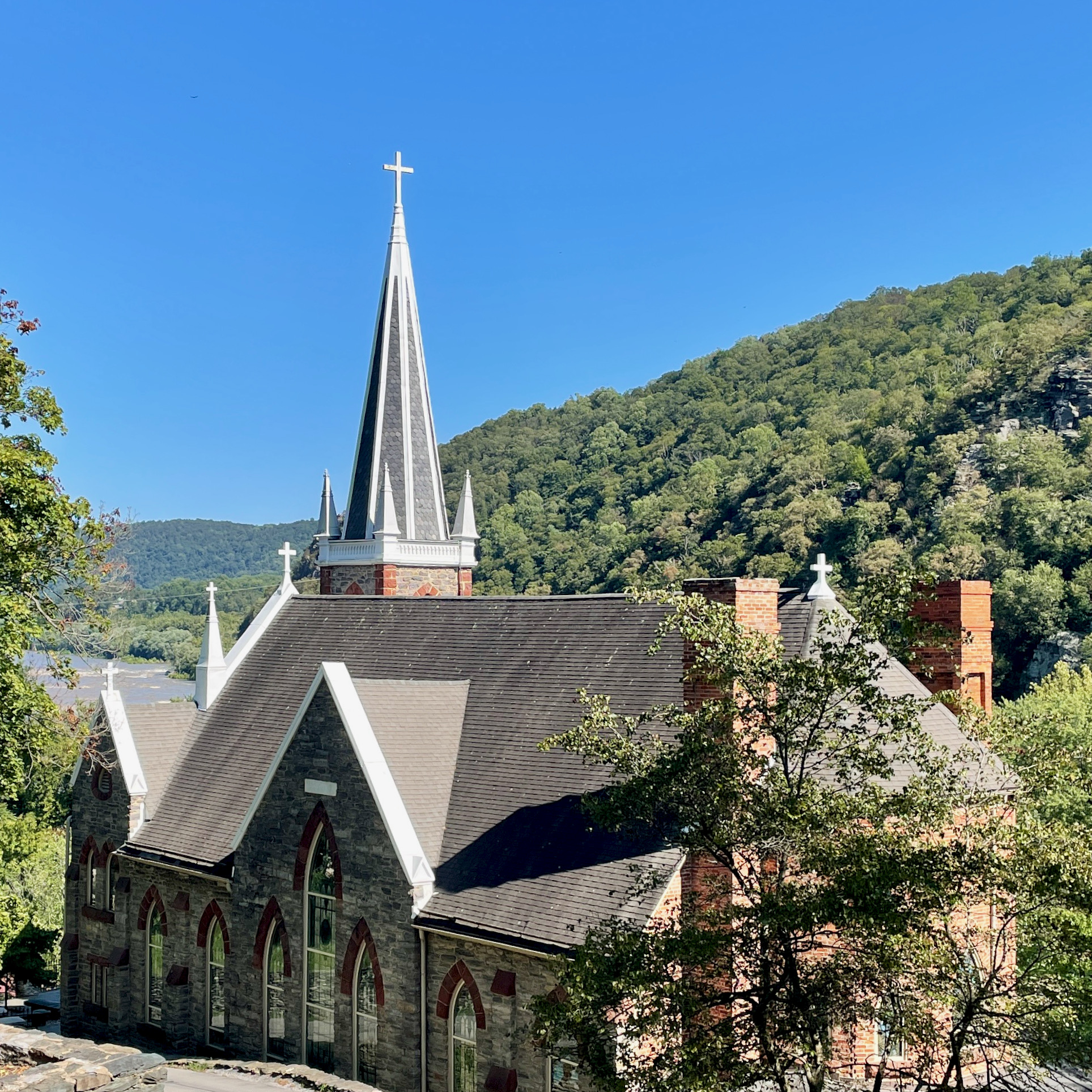
Looking east from the Appalachian Trail

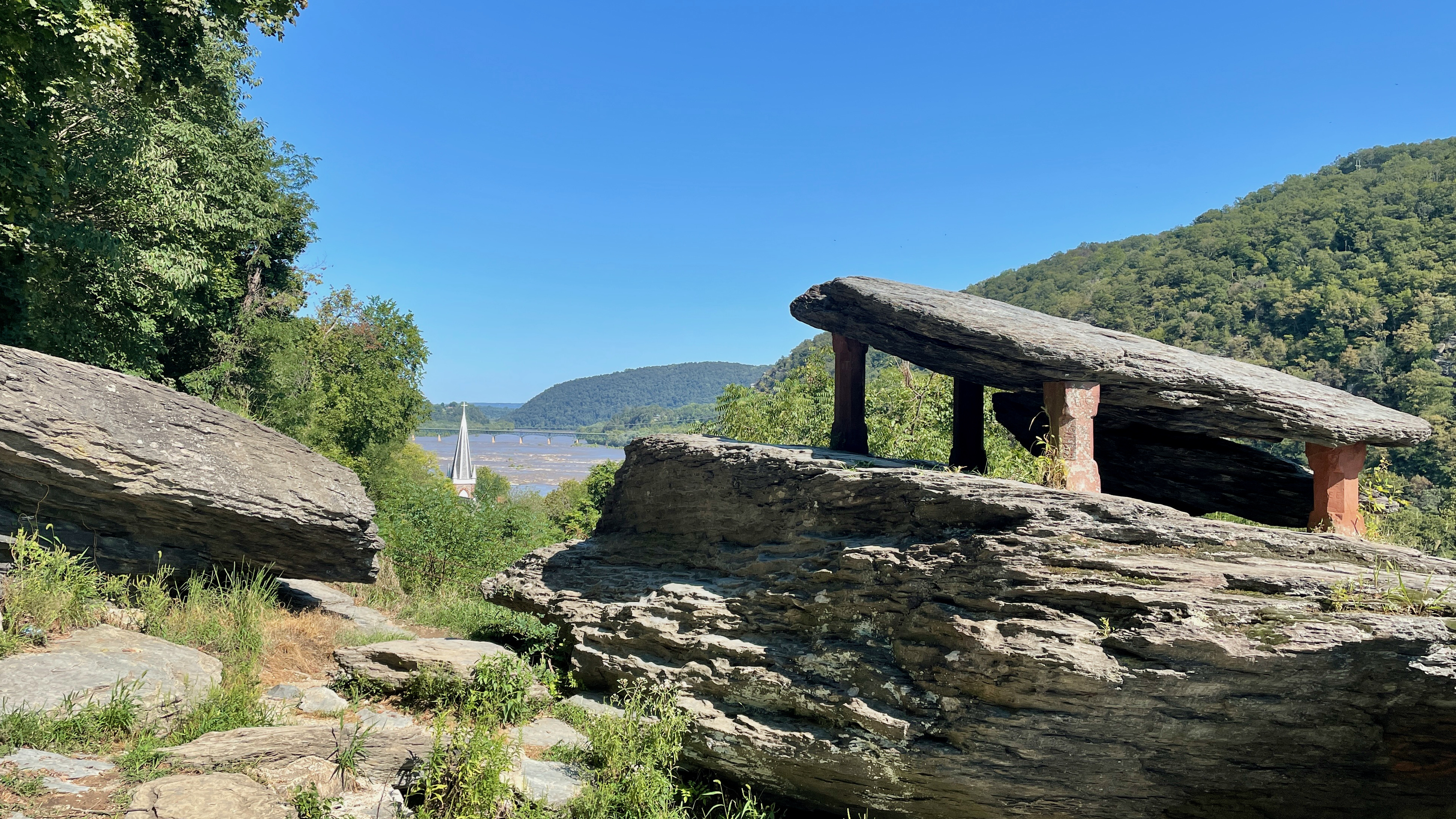
View from Jefferson Rock

== See also ==
- National Register of Historic Places listings in Jefferson County, West Virginia
- Harpers Ferry National Historical Park
- Harpers Ferry Historic District
