= Weverton Formation =

Geologic formation in the United States

- Stratigraphic range: Cambrian
- Weverton Formation from Sunset Rocks
- Type: Formation
- Unit of: Chilhowee Group
- Sub-units: Buzzard Knob Member, Maryland Heights Member, and Owens Creek Member
- Underlies: Harpers Formation
- Overlies: Catoctin Formation and London Conglomerate

Lithology
- Primary: sandstone, quartzite,
- Other: shale, siltstone

Location
- Region: Appalachia, Mid-Atlantic United States, and Southeastern United States
- Country: United States
- Extent: Maryland, Pennsylvania, Virginia, and West Virginia

Type section
- Named for: Weverton, Maryland

The Weverton Formation is a quartzite geologic formation in Maryland, Virginia, West Virginia, and Pennsylvania. It is considered the basal member of the Chilhowee Group. The Weverton Formation dates back to the Cambrian period.

== Description ==
The Weverton Formation is composed of three members: the Buzzard Knob Member, Maryland Heights Member, and Owens Creek Member. The Buzzard Knob member is a coarse-grained quartzite with pervasive cross-beds. The Maryland Heights member consists of metamorphosed siltstone, coarse-grained metamorphosed greywacke, and quartzite. The Owens Creek Member is a coarse-grained to conglomeratic metamorphosed greywacke. The formation was deposited in an alluvial environment.

The Weverton Formation is considered the main ridge forming unit in the Blue Ridge Mountains of Maryland.

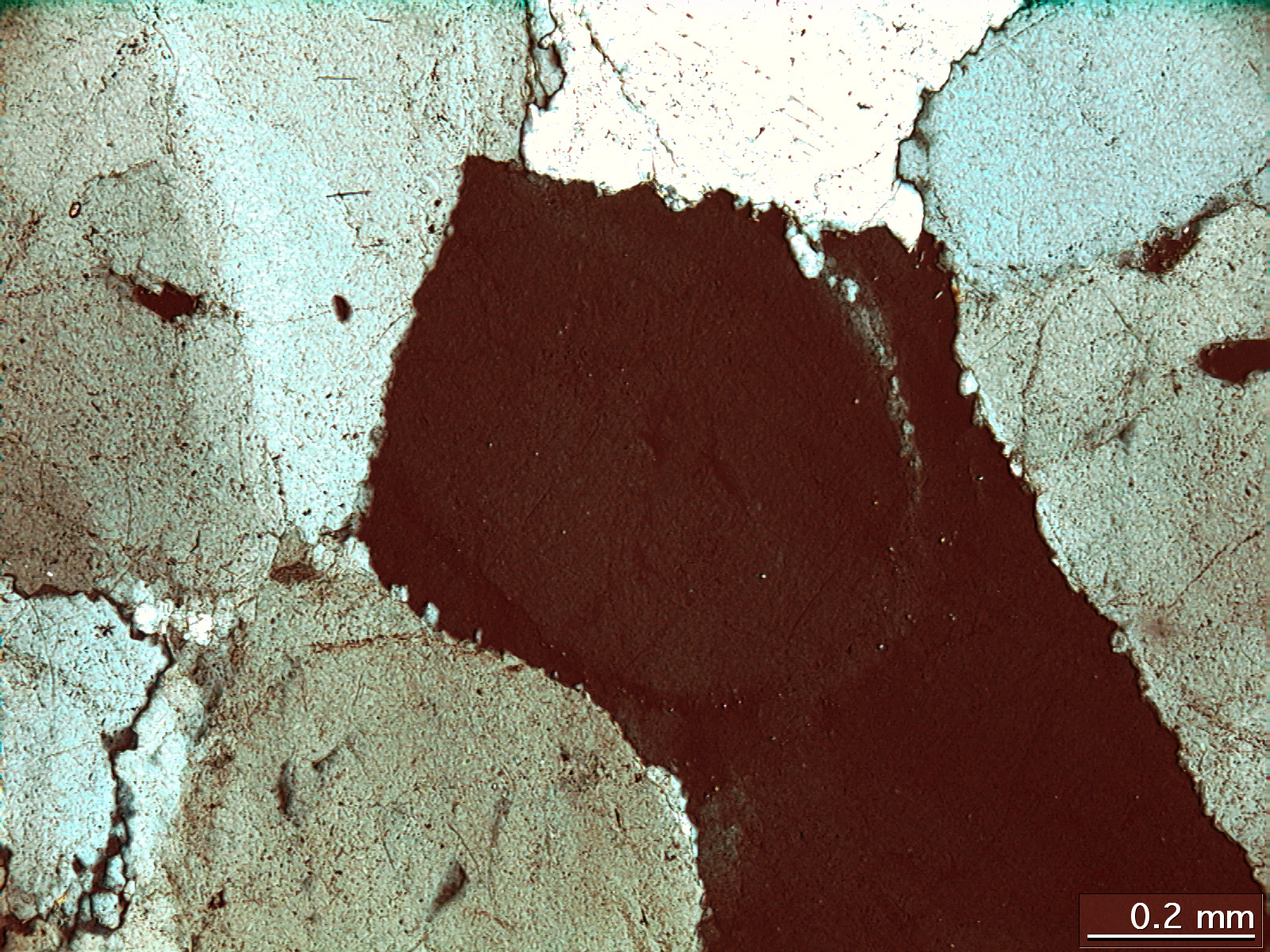
Thin section of quartz grains of the Weverton Formation (crossed polarized light)

=== History ===
The Weverton Formation is sometimes incorrectly spelled Weaverton and has been called the Weverton Sandstone or the Weverton Quartzite. It was divided into three members originally called the lower, middle, and upper member. These members were informally called the Loft Mountain Member, the Oregon Hollow Member, and the Dismal Hollow Member before receiving their formal names in 1992.
