= Andrew Bruce (bishop) =

Andrew Bruce (c.1630–1699) was a 17th-century Scottish churchman who served as both Protestant Bishop of Dunkeld and Protestant Bishop of Orkney.

== Life ==
He was the second son of William Bruce of Balquharg, Commissary for St Andrews. He was educated at St Andrews University graduating MA in 1658. He gained a second degree of Master of Humanities in 1660. He then became "regent" giving lectures at St Salvator's College in St Andrews.

In May 1665 he began ministering in the Church of Scotland serving the parish of Kilrenny on the eastern edge of Fife.

He appears as Professor of Divinity at St Andrews University in August 1672, being additionally admitted as minister of St Andrews in January 1673. In 1674 he was appointed Rector of St Andrews University. He was also created Chaplain in Ordinary to King Charles II.

He was made Bishop of Dunkeld in 1679, being consecrated at St Andrews Cathedral on 28 October 1679 but was deprived of the bishopric in 1686 for disapproving of certain newly enacted laws. Two years later, in July 1688, he was made Bishop of Orkney, but only held this position for a few months, as the Glorious Revolution brought an end to the Restoration Episcopate of the Scottish church.

Bruce retired to Kilrenny and died there on 18 March 1699.

== Family ==
He married Elizabeth Bethune, youngest daughter of John Bethune, 12th of Balfour, and his wife Catherine Haliburton, and they had a son James Bruce born in 1676.

Church of Scotland titles
Preceded by William Lindsay	Bishop of Dunkeld; 1679–1686	Succeeded by John Hamilton
Preceded by Murdoch MacKenzie	Bishop of Orkney; 1688	Succeeded by -
