= Jefferson Rock =

Rock formation in Harpers Ferry, West Virginia

- Rock formation
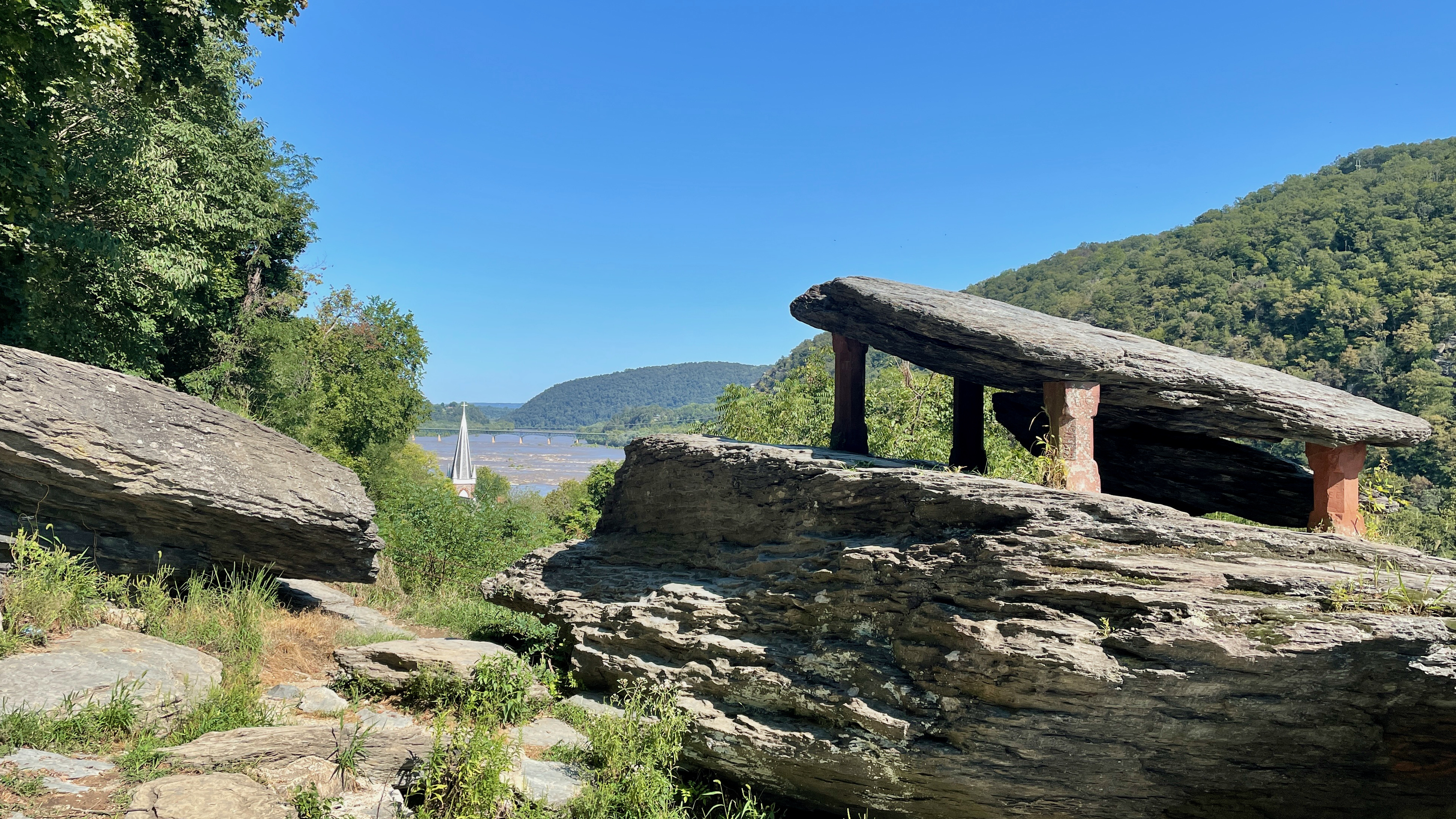
- Jefferson Rock and the view looking east

- Location within West Virginia Location within the United States
- Coordinates: 39°19′21.4″N 77°43′59.8″W
- Location: Harpers Ferry, West Virginia
- Geology: Harpers Formation
- Elevation: 127 m (417 ft)
- Jefferson Rock
- U.S. Historic district – Contributing property
- Part of: Harpers Ferry National Historical Park (ID66000041)
- Designated CP: October 15, 1966

Jefferson Rock is a rock formation on the Appalachian Trail in Harpers Ferry, West Virginia. It consists of several large masses of Harpers shale, piled one upon the other, that overlook the Shenandoah River just prior to its confluence with the Potomac River. It was added to the National Register of Historic Places as a contributing property of the Harpers Ferry National Historical Park on October 15, 1966.

== History ==
The name of this landmark derives from Thomas Jefferson, who stood there on October 25, 1783. He found the view from the rock impressive and wrote in Notes on the State of Virginia:

The passage of the Patowmac through the Blue Ridge is perhaps one of the most stupendous scenes in Nature. You stand on a very high point of land. On your right comes up the Shenandoah, having ranged along the foot of the mountain a hundred miles to seek a vent. On your left approaches the Patowmac in quest of a passage also. In the moment of their junction they rush together against the mountain, rend it asunder and pass off to the sea. The first glance of this scene hurries our senses into the opinion that this earth has been created in time, that the mountains were formed first, that the rivers began to flow afterwards, that in this place particularly they have been so dammed up by the Blue Ridge of mountains as to have formed an ocean which filled the whole valley; that, continuing to rise, they have at last broken over at this spot and have torn the mountain down from its summit to its base. The piles of rock on each hand, but particularly on the Shenandoah, the evident marks of their disruptions and avulsions from their beds by the most powerful agents in nature, corroborate the impression.

But the distant finishing which nature has given the picture is of a very different character. It is a true contrast to the former. It is as placid and delightful as that is wild and tremendous. For the mountains being cloven asunder, she presents to your eye, through the cleft, a small catch of smooth blue horizon, at an infinite distance in that plain country, inviting you, as it were, from the riot and tumult roaring around to pass through the breach and participate in the calm below. Here the eye ultimately composes itself; and that way, too, the road happens actually to lead. You cross the Patowmac above the junction, pass along its side through the base of the mountain for three miles, the terrible precipice hanging in fragments over you, and within about 20 miles reach Frederictown and the fine country around that. This scene is worth a voyage across the Atlantic.

The uppermost slab of Jefferson Rock originally rested on a natural stone foundation so narrow that one was able to sway the rock back and forth with a gentle push. Because this natural foundation had "dwindled to very unsafe dimensions by the action of the weather, and still more, by the devastations of tourists and curiosity-hunters," four stone pillars were placed under each corner of the uppermost slab sometime between 1855 and 1860. Climbing on Jefferson Rock today is prohibited by law.

== Gallery ==
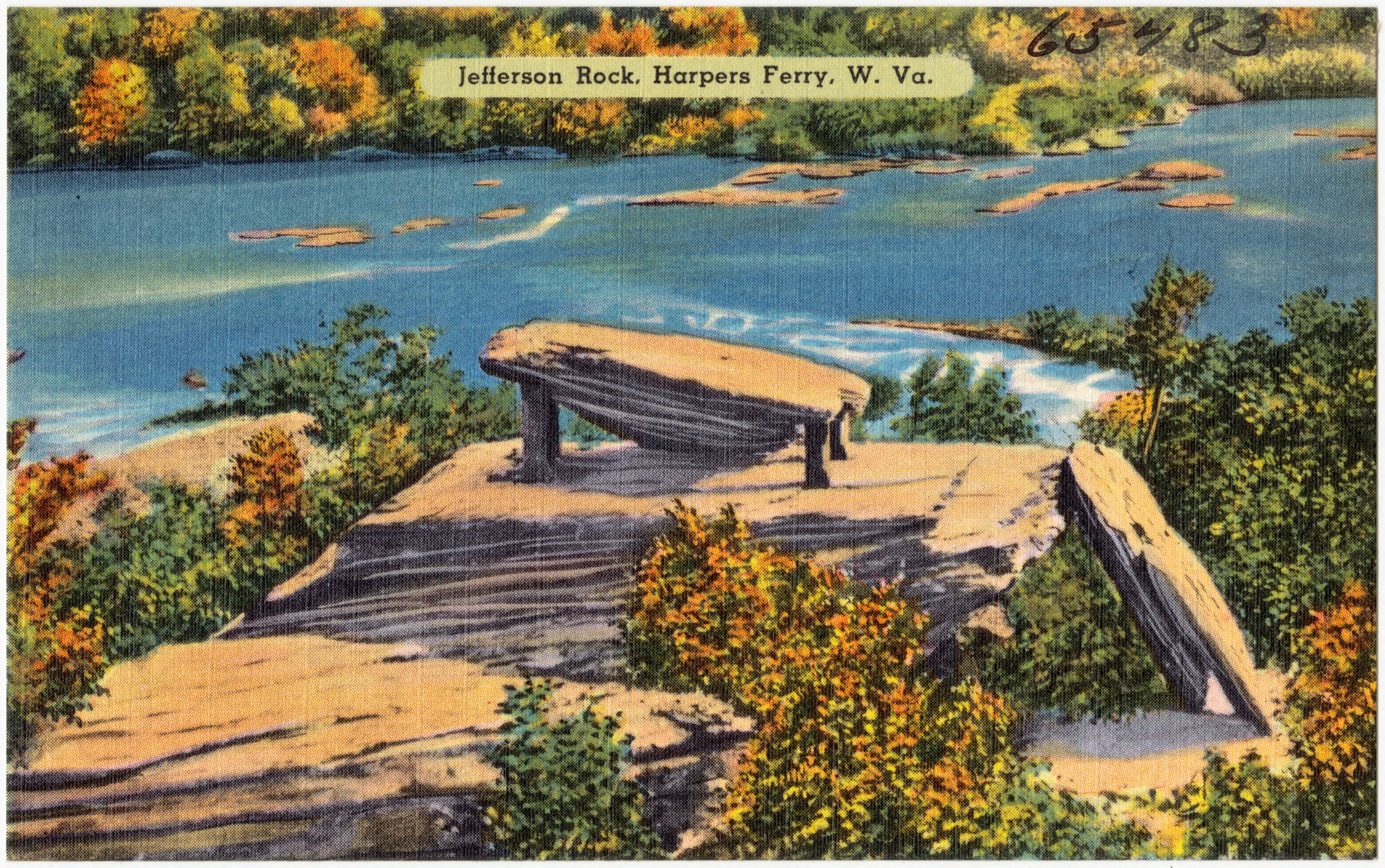
Postcard view from c. 1930–1945

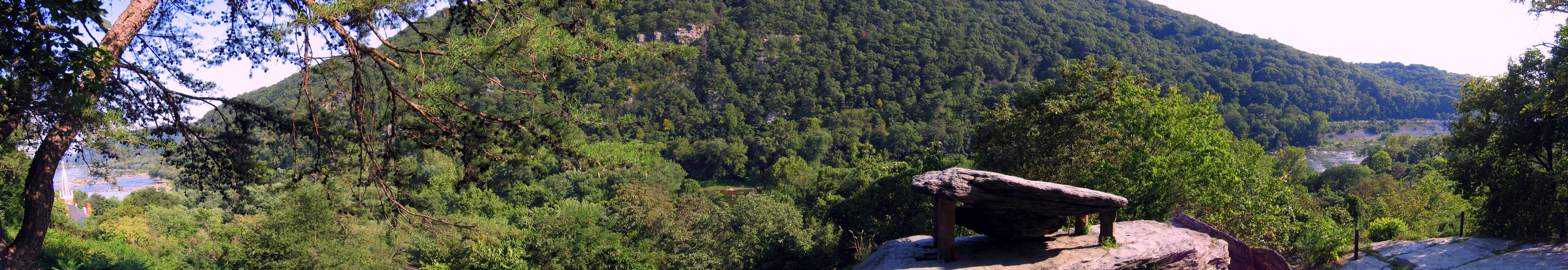
This is a panoramic view of Jefferson Rock (right foreground) and the surrounding river valley. The lower town of Harpers Ferry and the confluence of the Shenandoah and Potomac Rivers appears on the left. The church steeple (also left) belongs to St. Peter's Roman Catholic Church.

== See also ==
- Balancing rock
- List of individual rocks
- National Register of Historic Places listings in Jefferson County, West Virginia
