= Alexander Lindsay of Evelick (bishop) =

Alexander Lindsay of Evelick (c. 1561 – 1639), was a Church of Scotland minister who rose to be Bishop of Dunkeld.

== Life ==
He was second son of John Lindsay, laird of Evelick. He graduated MA at St Leonard's College, St Andrews, and spent some time as a "regent" (the equivalent of a Fellow of the college).

In October 1591 Lindsay was ordained as minister of St Madoes church in Perthshire. He was elected Constant Moderator in 1606 but served only one year as he was chosen to be Bishop of Dunkeld on 21 December 1607. On 27 January 1624, he was admitted to the Scottish Privy Council. He assisted in the coronation of King Charles I in 1633.

He was hostile to the introduction of the Book of Common Prayer in 1637 and, contrary to royal policy, favoured a reduced role for bishops. The following year he submitted to the Covenanters and was deprived of his office as Bishop on 24 December 1638. He temporarily lost his ministry of St Madoes but was reinstated in January 1639 having repented publicly at Kilspindie Church. He died in October 1639.

== Family ==
He married twice: firstly to Barbara Bruce (d. August 1626), and had several children

- Alexander Lindsay heir to Evelick
- William Lindsay of Kilspindie
- Catherine married John Lundie of Lundie
- Helen married Sir Patrick Hay of Pitfour

Secondly he married Nicholas (sic) Dundas.

Religious titles
Preceded by James Nicolson	Bishop of Dunkeld; 1607–1638	Vacant Title next held by George Haliburton
