= Chilhowee Group =

Rock formation in the United States

- Stratigraphic range: Cambrian
- Type: Group
- Sub-units: Loudoun Formation; Weverton Formation; Harpers Formation; Antietam Formation
- Underlies: Tomstown Dolomite
- Overlies: Catoctin Formation

Location
- Region: Alabama, Maryland, Tennessee, North Carolina, Virginia, West Virginia
- Country: United States

Type section
- Named for: Chilhowee Mountain, Tennessee

The Chilhowee Group is a sedimentary body composed of early Cambrian siliciclastic sedimentary rocks which crop out along the eastern margin of the Blue Ridge province in Alabama, Maryland, Tennessee, North Carolina, Virginia, and West Virginia. They represent a rift to passive margin sequence, with mostly coarse, feldspathic sandstones and conglomerates in the lower member and shales and phyllite in the upper members.

In the Mid-Atlantic region, the Chilhowee Group contains four formations; the Loudoun Formation, Weverton Formation, Harpers Formation and Antietam Formation. Another name for the Harpers formations is the Hampton formation, and the Antietam Formation is also known as the Erwin Formation. The Hampton Formation has minor economic importance in the area near the James River Face Wilderness. As of 1982 there were three quarries operating near the James River Face Wilderness. Those quarries produced roofing shale, light weight aggregate, and various materials for brick making. The Antietam Formation also had a minor economic importance, particularly from 1945 up until 1966. There were three quarries producing crushed quartzite, which was used to produce concrete aggregates, road metal and railroad ballast.

In Alabama and Georgia, the Chilhowee is divided into two formations: the lower Wilson Ridge Formation and the upper Weisner Formation. In the southern Appalachians the two formations represent clastic deposition into the widening Iapetus basin.
