= William Lindsay of Dowhill =

Scottish Presbyterian minister

William Lindsay of Dowhill (1638–1679) was a 17th-century Scottish Presbyterian minister, serving in Perth, Scotland. He is most notable for holding the position of Bishop of Dunkeld between 1677 and his death in 1679.

== Life ==
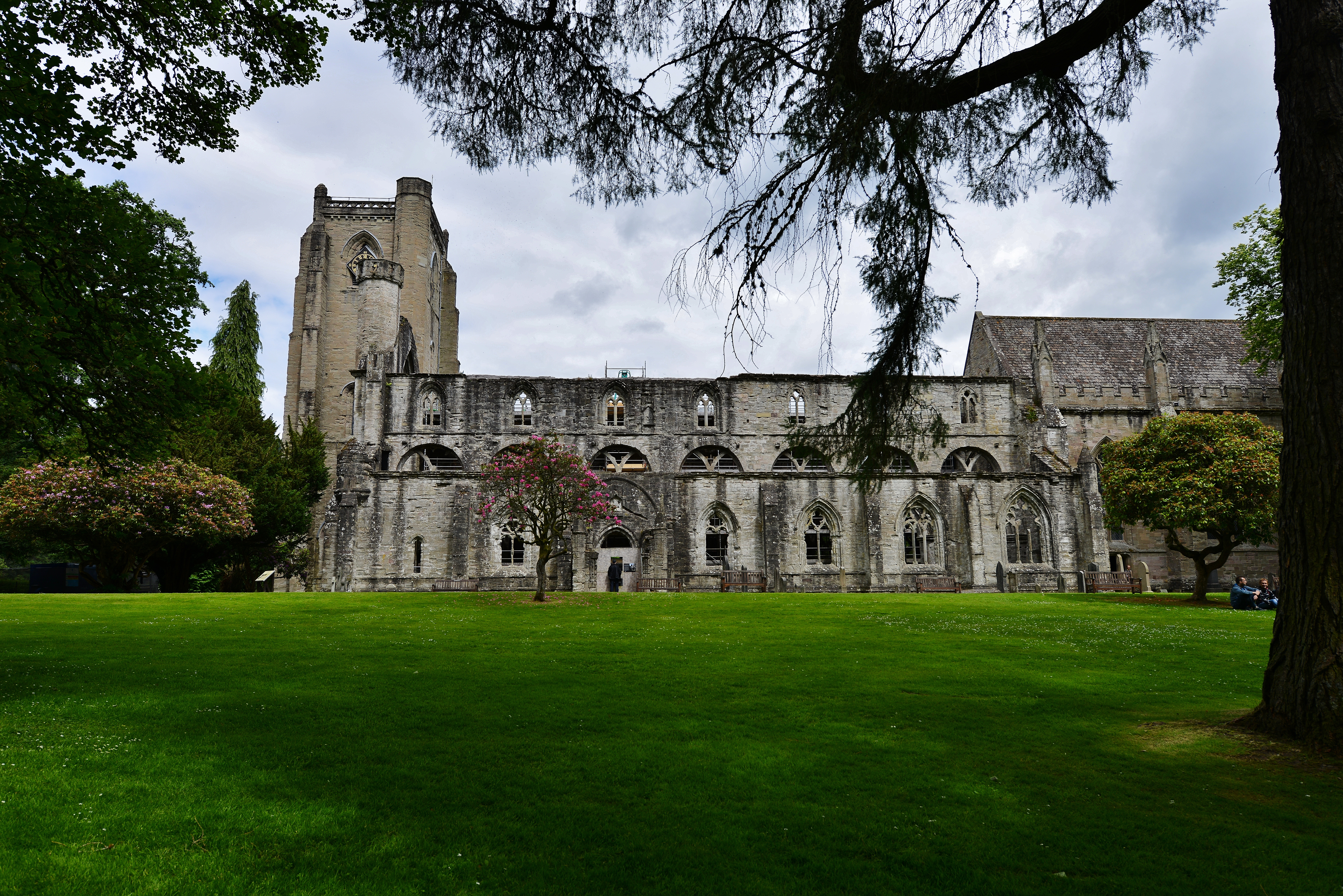
Dunkeld Cathedral

He was born in 1638 the second son of James Lindsay of Dowhill and Margaret Nicolson daughter of Bishop James Nicolson. He was educated at St Andrews University graduating MA in 1656.

He went to England and was ordained in September 1660 into the Church of England by Gilbert (sic), Bishop of Chichester. Returning to Scotland he was presented to the congregation of Auchterderran and admitted as their Church of Scotland minister before July 1663. He translated to Perth in April 1668. e was promoted to the post of Bishop of Dunkeld and was consecrated in this role on 26 May 1677 in place of the late Bishop Henry Guthrie. He demitted his parochial charge in Perth in October 1678 and died in April 1679 aged only 41.

== Family ==
In 1666 he married Catherine Skene daughter of Sir Andrew Skene of Hallyards. Following Lindsay's death she married David Forman of Spinkstoune, a "writer" (lawyer) in Edinburgh. Catherine and William had several children:

- James Lindsay of Dowhill, their heir.
- John Lindsay
- Barbara, married Henry Balfour of Raith
- Margaret married James Moyes a lawyer in Kirkcaldy

Church of Scotland titles
Preceded by Henry Guthrie	Bishop of Dunkeld; 1677–1679	Succeeded by Andrew Bruce
