= Kilspindie =

Coordinates: 56°24′58″N 3°15′57″W

- Location within Perth and Kinross
- Area: 10.2 sq mi (26 km^{2})
- OS grid reference: NO220256
- Council area: Perth and Kinross
- Lieutenancy area: Perth and Kinross
- Country: Scotland
- Sovereign state: United Kingdom
- Post town: PERTH
- Postcode district: PH2
- Dialling code: 01821
- Police: Scotland
- Fire: Scottish
- Ambulance: Scottish
- Scottish Parliament: North Tayside; North East Scotland

Kilspindie is a village in Perth and Kinross, Scotland. It is situated on the Kilspindie burn, approximately 2 3/4 miles (4.5 kilometres) northwest of Errol, 12 miles (19 kilometres) west of Dundee city centre and 6 1/2 miles (10 kilometres) east of Perth. The village has an area of 6,500 acres (2,600 hectares) of which 3,500 acres (1,400 hectares) are arable land and 200 acres (81 hectares) are woodland, the local geology is mostly whinstone, amygdule and trap. Records show there was a chapel in the village since at least 1214 though the current church, the Kilspindie and Rait Parish Church, was built in 1670 and refurbished in 1938. The village previously housed the Kilspindie Castle which was demolished before 1670.

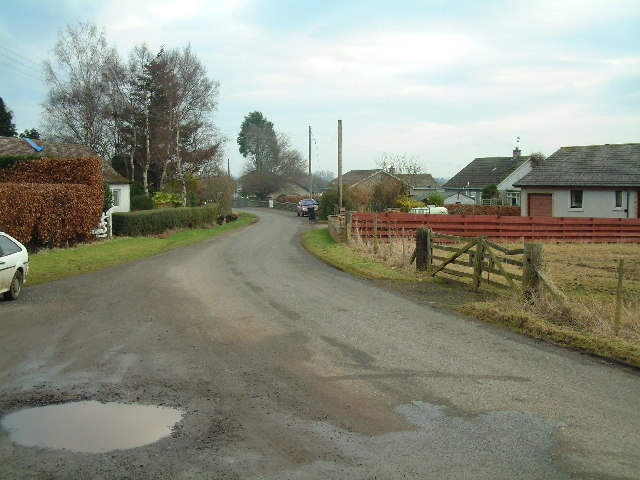
Kilspindie village

In the Ordnance Gazetteer of Scotland (1882–84) Francis Groome described Kilspindie:

Kilspindie, a village and a parish in Gowrie district, SE Perthshire. The village, standing in the mouth of a small glen, 1 mile SSW of Rait, 2⅛ miles NNW of Errol station, and 3⅜ NNE of Glencarse station, had anciently a castle, now extinct, and figures in Blind Harry's narrative as the place where Sir William Wallace, with his mother, found refuge in his boyhood.

The village is twinned with Fléac in France.
