= Roger Lindsay =

Canadian accountant (1941–2023)

The Much Honoured Roger Lindsay of Craighall KStJ FRHSC FSAScot

Rouge Herald Extraordinary
- In office 2006 – 2023
- Monarchs: Elizabeth II; Charles III
- Governors General: Michaëlle Jean; David Johnston; Julie Payette; Mary Simon

Personal details
- Born: Roger Alexander Lindsay; 1941 Dundee, Scotland, United Kingdom
- Died: 30 March 2023 (aged 81–82) Toronto, Ontario, Canada
- Occupation: Accountant; Officer of arms

Roger Alexander Lindsay of Craighall (1941 – March 30, 2023) was a Scottish-Canadian accountant who was also Rouge Herald Extraordinary at the Canadian Heraldic Authority.

== Life ==
Lindsay was a member of the Institute of Chartered Accountants of Scotland and served as a trustee, director, and secretary of The W. Garfield Weston Foundation. He was both a convener of the Board of Governors of Knox College, in the University of Toronto and a national trustee of the Presbyterian Church in Canada, for the latter of which he also served as the Moderator of the Presbytery of East Toronto.

A noted supporter of the Crown in Canada and a donor to renovation projects at Rideau Hall, Lindsay served as an Aide-de-Camp to the Lieutenant-Governor of Ontario and was a past Vice-Chancellor, Governance, and the past Chief of Protocol of the Priory of Canada of Order of St John. On 11 October 2006, Lindsay was created Rouge Herald Extraordinary with the Canadian Heraldic Authority. Both prior to and following his appointment as Rouge Herald Extraordinary, Lindsay would play a role in the designing and granting of armorial bearings and emblems to a number of Canadian institutions and people, including Knox College.

On 2 April 2023, it was announced that Lindsay had died a few days prior at his home in Toronto on 30 March 2023.

== Honours ==
Lindsay was a fellow of the Chartered Management Institute, the Institute of Corporate Directors, the Society of Antiquaries of Scotland, and of the Royal Canadian Geographical Society. He was also made an Honorary Fellow of the Royal Heraldry Society of Canada in 2015 as well as the patron of its Toronto Branch. In light of his involvement with the Order of St. John, Lindsay was awarded the Vice Regal Commendation, The Chancellor's Commendation and the Chairman's Commendation of Ontario Council of St. John.

Additionally, from 2007 to 2014, Lindsay held the appointment as the Honorary Colonel of The Windsor Regiment (RCAC).

=== Orders & medals ===
Ribbon	Description	Notes	Ref
	Knight of Justice of the Order of St. John	Appointed Knight of Justice in 2006	
	Queen Elizabeth II Golden Jubilee Medal for Canada	Awarded in 2002	
	Queen Elizabeth II Diamond Jubilee Medal for Canada	Awarded in 2012	
	Service Medal of the Most Venerable Order of St. John of Jerusalem		

=== Arms ===
Lindsay was granted a coat of arms by Lord Lyon King of Arms in 1987, which would be registered with the Canadian Heraldic Authority in 1997. In 2004 the Lord Lyon King of Arms made a further grant based on the original 1987 arms which includes the additaments particular to a Scottish barony together with a standard.

Coat of arms of Roger Lindsay
Adopted February 17, 1987 (grant from the Court of the Lord Lyon); February 18, 1997 (registered by the Canadian Heraldic Authority); January 27, 2004 (grant from the Lord Lyon of the baronial cap and mantle). Crest A swan Or charged on the breast with a maple leaf Gules Escutcheon Gules a fess chequy Azure and Argent between a lion passant guardant Argent in chief and a pot of three growing lilies also Argent in the base Motto FESTINA LENTE

Baronage of Scotland
Preceded by unknown	Baron of Craighall; 2004-2023	Succeeded by dormant
