= James Noble (Royal Navy officer) =

British Royal Navy vice admiral

Vice-Admiral James Noble
- Born: 1774
- Died: 25 October 1851 (aged 76–77); London
- Spouse(s): Sarah Lamb (m. 1801–1818) Dorothy Halliday (m. 1820–1840) Jane Spettigue (m. 1842)
- Military career
- Allegiance: United Kingdom
- Branch: Royal Navy
- Service years: 1787–1851
- Rank: Vice-Admiral
- Commands: Sussex Sea Fencibles
- Conflicts: French Revolutionary Wars; Siege of Toulon; Battle of Genoa; Battle of the Hyères Islands; Action of 19 December 1796 (WIA); Battle of Cape St Vincent; Napoleonic Wars

Vice-Admiral James Noble (1774 – 24 October 1851) was a Royal Navy officer who saw significant service under the command of Horatio Nelson, acting as his flag lieutenant.

== Biography ==
Noble was the grandson of Thomas Noble, who emigrated from Devonshire to North America, joined the Moravians, and placed his whole property, 4,000l., in the funds of the sect. Thomas's son Isaac quit the Moravians, but could only recover 1,400l., with which he bought an estate of 1,400 acres in East Jersey. He married Rachel de Joncourt, the daughter of a French Protestant, and had a large family. When the revolutionary war broke out, he took service in the royal army, and was killed in 1778. The estate was forfeited at the peace, and the widow came to England, where she was granted a pension of 100l. a year. Three only of the sons survived their childhood. Of these, the eldest, Richard, a midshipman of the Clyde frigate, was lost in La Dorade prize, in 1797; the youngest De Joncourt, also a midshipman, died of yellow fever in the West Indies. James, the second of the three, born in 1774, entered the navy in 1787, and, having served in several different ships on the home station, was in January 1793 appointed to the Bedford of 74 guns, in which he went to the Mediterranean; was landed at Toulon, with the small-arm men, and was present in the actions of 14 March and 13 July 1795. He was then moved into the Britannia, William Hotham's flagship, and on 5 October was appointed to the Agamemnon, as acting lieutenant with Commodore Horatio Nelson. The promotion was confirmed by the admiralty, to date from 9 March 1796.

The service of the Agamemnon at this time was particularly active and dangerous, and Noble's part in it was very distinguished. On 29 November 1795 he was landed to carry despatches to De Vins, the Austrian general, then encamped above Savona. He was taken prisoner on the way and detained for some months, when he was exchanged. He rejoined the Agamemnon at Genoa about the middle of April 1796. A few days later, 25 April, he was in command of one of the boats sent in to cut out a number of the enemy's store-ships from under the batteries at Loano. While cutting the cable of one of these vessels Noble was struck in the throat by a musket-ball. 'It is with the greatest grief,' Nelson reported, 'I have to mention that Lieutenant James Noble, a most worthy and gallant officer, is, I fear, mortally wounded.' Noble's own account of it is: 'I was completely paralysed, and my coxswain nearly finished me by clapping a "tarnaket," in the shape of a black silk handkerchief, on my throat to stop the loss of blood. Luckily a mate stopped me from strangulation by cutting it with his knife, to the great dismay of the coxswain, who assured him I should bleed to death. The ball was afterwards extracted on the opposite side.'

In June Noble followed Nelson to the Captain, and in July was placed in temporary command of a prize brig fitted out as the Vernon gunboat. In October he rejoined the Captain as Nelson's flag-lieutenant; went with Nelson to the Minerve, was severely wounded in the action with the Sabina on 20 December 1796, and on the eve of the battle of St. Vincent returned with Nelson to the Captain. In the battle he commanded a division of boarders, and, assisted by the boatswain, boarded the San Nicolas by the spritsail-yard. For this service he was promoted to be commander, 27 February 1797. On his return to England he was examined at Surgeons' Hall, and obtained a certificate that 'his wounds from their singularity and the consequences which have attended them are equal in prejudice to the health to loss of limb.' The report was lodged with the privy council, but, 'as a voluntary contribution to the exigencies of the State,' he did not then apply for a pension. Some years later, when he did apply, he was told that 'their lordships could not reopen claims so long passed where promotion had been received during the interval.' In March 1798 he was appointed to the command of the sea fencibles on the coast of Sussex, and on 29 April 1802 was advanced to post rank. He had no further service, and on 10 January 1837 was promoted to be rear-admiral on the retired list. On 17 August 1840 he was moved on to the active list; and on 9 November 1846 became a vice-admiral. He died in London on 24 October 1851. He was three times married, and left issue.
