= Harpers Formation =

Geologic formation in the United States

- Stratigraphic range: Cambrian
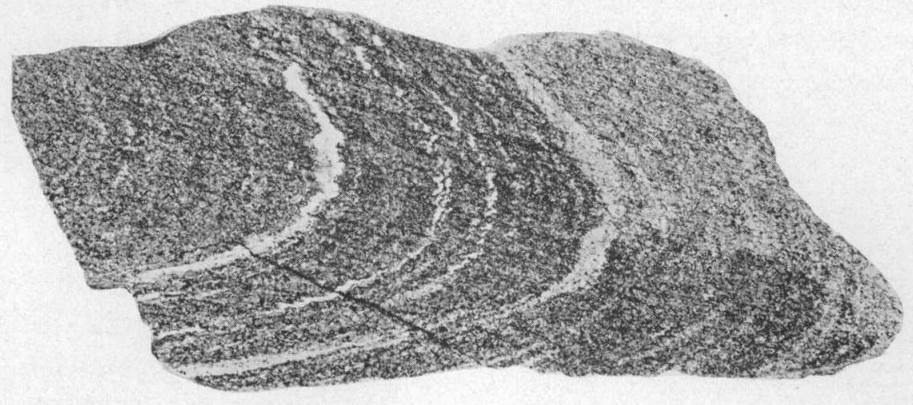
- Harpers Schist. Shows older folded schistosity parallel to bedding cut by younger cleavage inclined to bedding.
- Type: Metamorphic
- Unit of: Chilhowee Group
- Sub-units: Snowden Member (VA), Montalto Quartzite Member (PA)
- Underlies: Antietam Formation
- Overlies: Weverton Formation

Lithology
- Primary: Schist
- Other: Phyllite, shale

Location
- Region: Appalachia, Mid-Atlantic United States, and Southeastern United States
- Country: United States
- Extent: Maryland, Pennsylvania, Virginia, West Virginia

Type section
- Named for: Harpers Ferry, West Virginia
- Named by: Arthur Keith (1894)

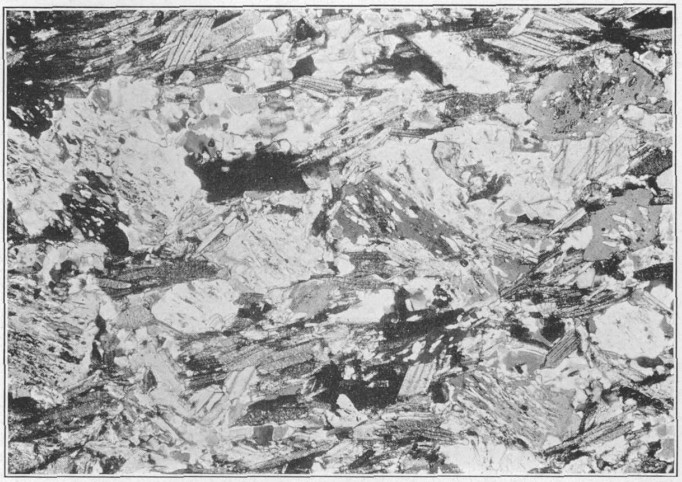
Photomicrograph of Harpers Schist

The Harpers Formation is a geologic formation in Maryland, Pennsylvania, Virginia, and West Virginia, consisting of schist, phyllite, and shale. It dates back to the early Cambrian period. It is considered part of the Chilhowee Group.

== Notable exposures ==
The type section is in gorges of the Potomac River and the Shenandoah River at Harpers Ferry, West Virginia.

The Harpers Formation overlies the Ledger Formation (dolomite) due to a thrust fault in small roadside quarry (currently overgrown) on Pottery Hill, southwest of York, Pennsylvania.

== Gallery ==
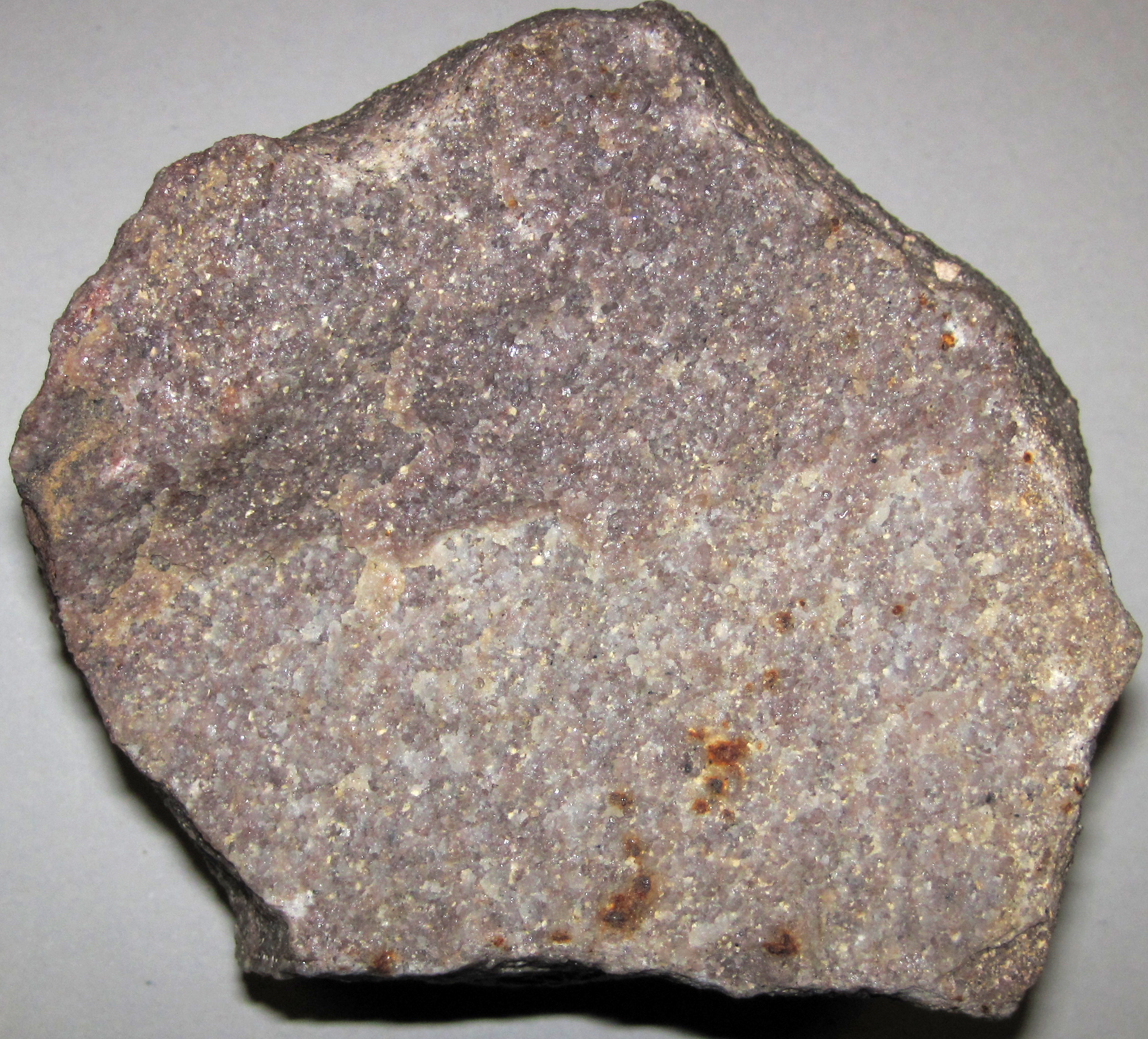
Quartzite sample of Harpers Formation from near Verona, Virginia

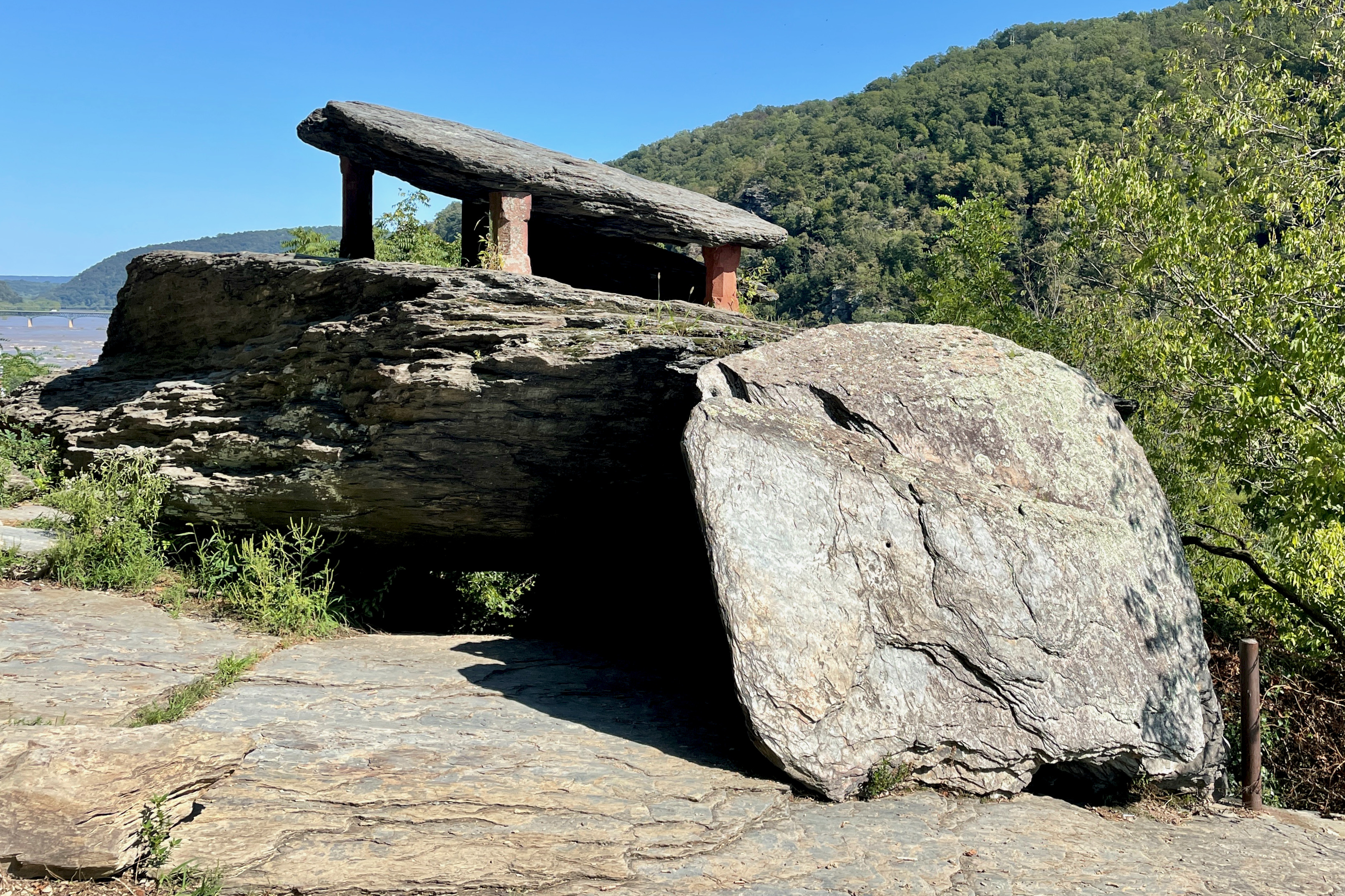
Harpers Shale by Jefferson Rock in Harpers Ferry, West Virginia

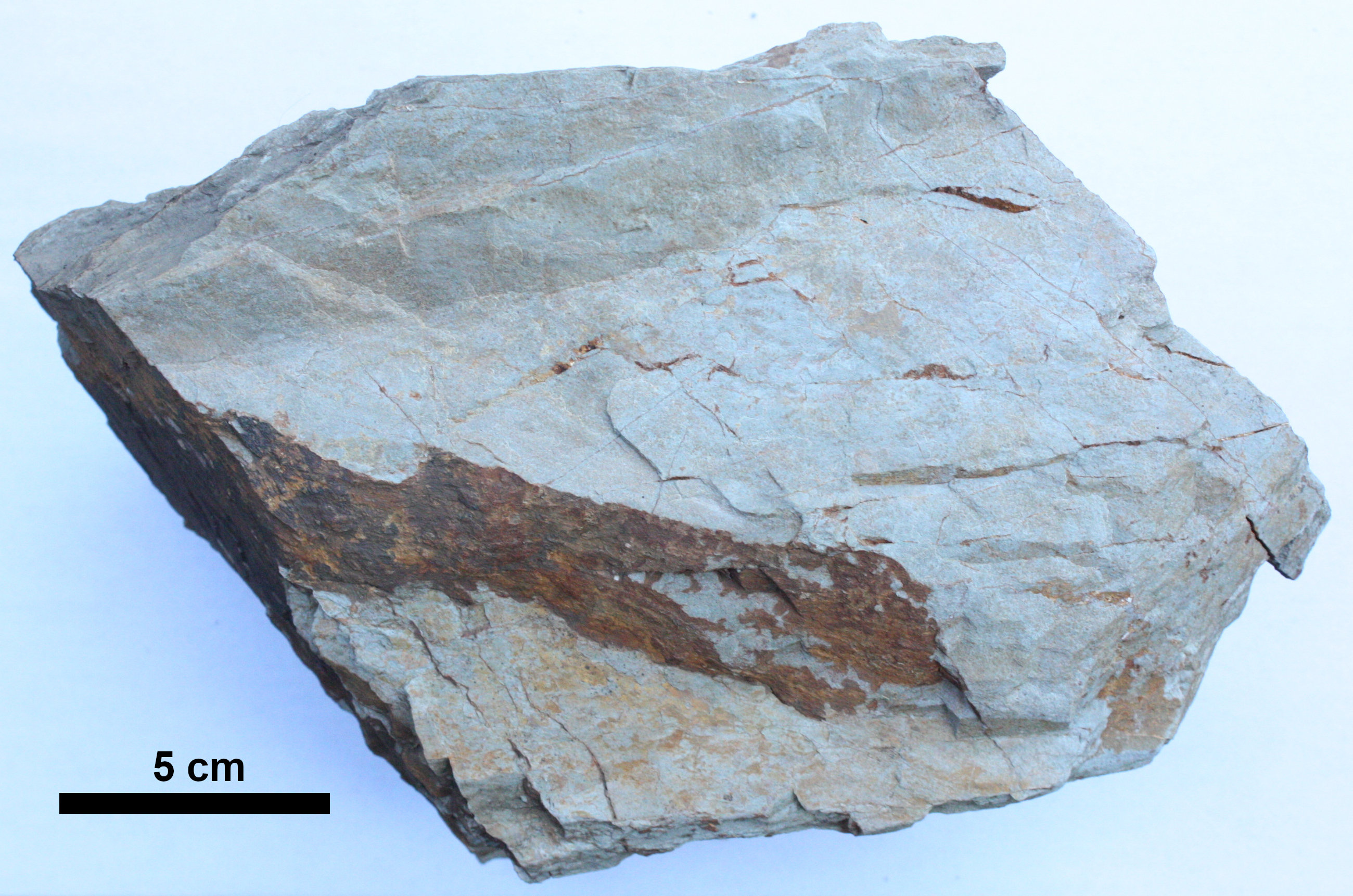
Sample of phyllite from the outcrop at Pottery Hill, southwest of York
