= Pitfour Castle =

Castle in Perth and Kinross, Scotland

Coordinates: 56.3734°N 3.2976°W

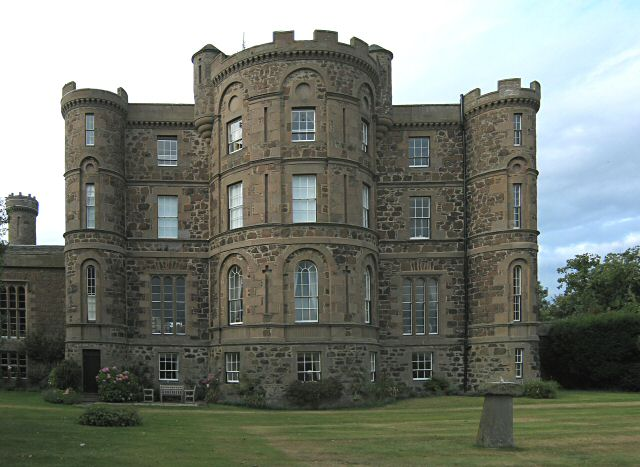
Southern elevation of Pitfour Castle with sundial on front lawn

Pitfour Castle is an 18th-century country house situated on the southeast edge of the village of St Madoes in the Carse of Gowrie, Perthshire, Scotland. It is a Category A listed building. Pitfour Castle is a private residence and access to the grounds is not available to the public.

== History ==
A tower house was formerly sited slightly closer to the River Tay, although nothing now remains. In June 1592 Harry Lindsay and 40 armed followers attacked the "Place of Pitfour" at night. They hid themselves close to the house and sent a messenger boy to get the yard gates or "yetts" opened. The trick worked but David Cochrane's defenders beat them back and closed the gates. Lindsay's men then managed to break into the castle, and forced the family and their retainers out, and put in his own men under his servant John Tweedy.

The present Pitfour Castle was built for John Richardson (1760–1821), a wealthy local man involved with the salmon fisheries of the Tay, around 1784. The design of the new house is attributed to the architect Robert Adam (1728–1792): although there is no documentary evidence for his involvement, there are stylistic similarities with Adam's later "castle-style" homes, such as Dalquharran Castle in Ayrshire (1786) and Seton Castle in Lothian (1789). In 1825, the house was enlarged to designs by William Burn, with a library to the north-west and a clock tower to the south-west.

By the 1860s the house was occupied and owned by Sir John Stewart-Richardson (who had adopted the additional name of Stewart on inheritance of his grandfather, James Stewart's, Urrard estate) together with his family.

Having fallen into disrepair, restoration work on Pitfour Castle began in 1964. In 1966, Burn's entrance hall was removed, revealing Adam's original entrance front. The house and 12 acres (4.9 ha) was advertised for sale in 1967 for £25,000. In July 1969, as restoration was nearing completion, the east wing was badly damaged by fire.

In the late twentieth century, Pitfour Castle was acquired by Lord Field (who lived in Walton Hall, Warwickshire), who undertook an extensive programme of restoration to preserve the historic Category A listed country house and secure its long-term future. The project focused on conserving the castle's Georgian and later Victorian architectural features while sympathetically modernising the interior for residential use. During Lord Field's ownership, significant investment was made in the restoration of the principal rooms, the estate grounds and associated buildings, ensuring the continued preservation of one of Perthshire's finest historic country houses.

== Interior ==
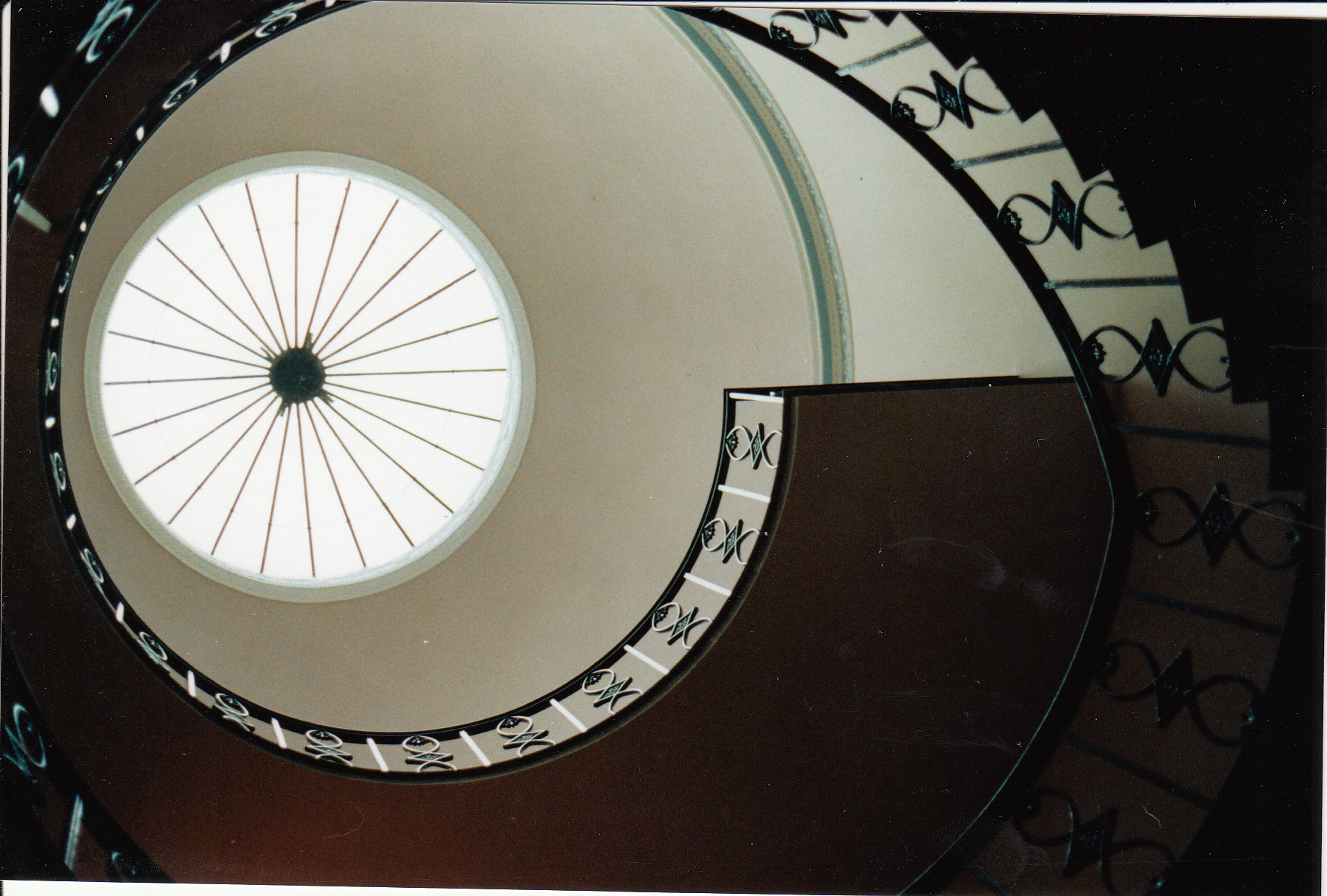
Primary staircase inside Pitfour castle with "cartoons" just visible as blue stripe underneath coving

The curved staircase forms the centrepiece of the house. In the 1967 sale particulars, this was described as a "fine circular wrought iron staircase rising through the house to a cupola with painted cartoons by Ritchie". Historic Scotland refers to these cartoons as "figure panels by Zucchi", an Italian who worked with Robert Adam. Prior to its subdivision, the house had 12 principal bedrooms, four bathrooms, five reception rooms and staff accommodation.
