= Amygdule =

Infilled gas cavity in extrusive igneous rock

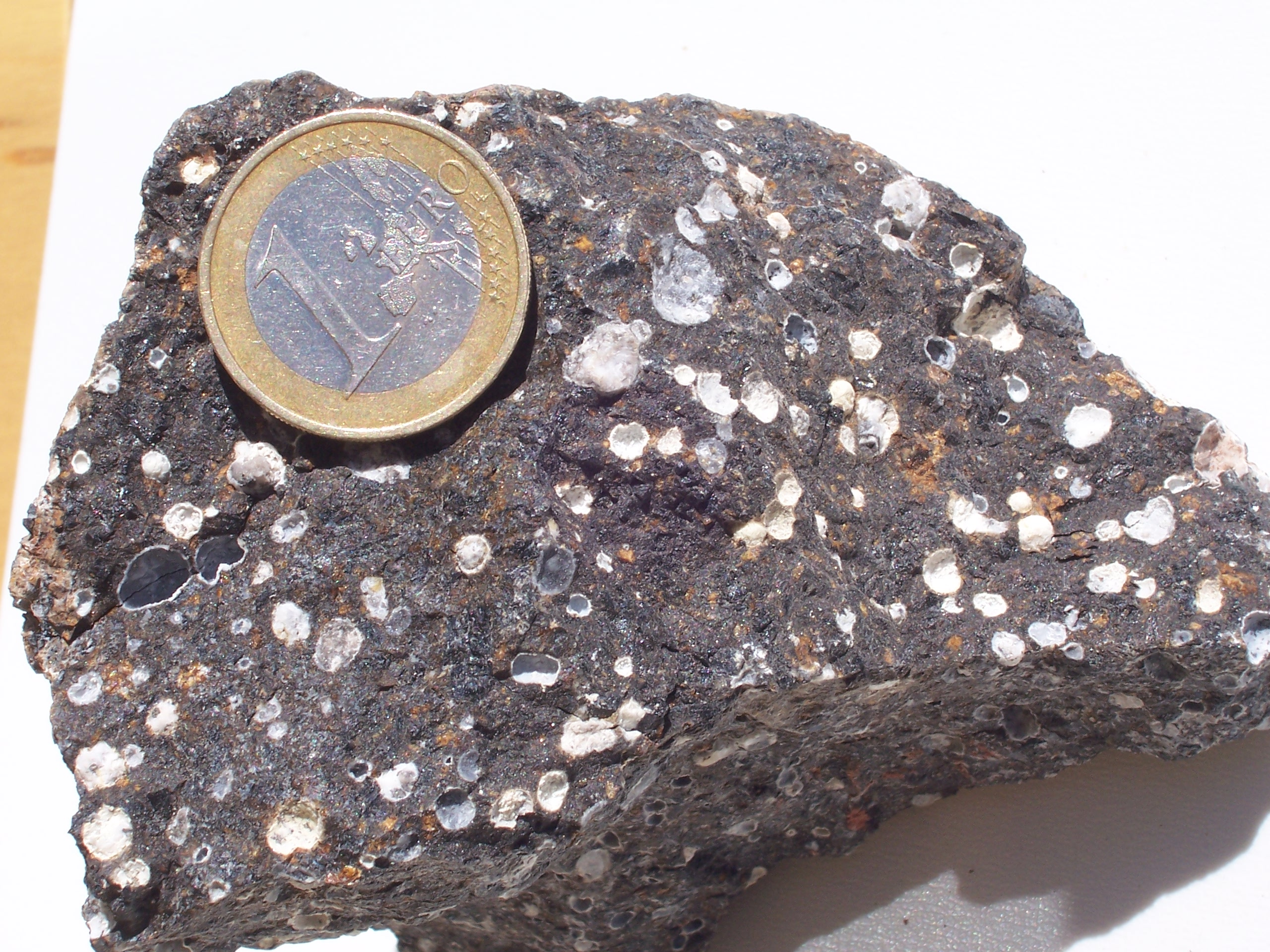
Amygdules in lava from Kaiserstuhl in Germany

Amygdules or amygdales (/əˈmɪɡdjuːlz, -deɪlz/) form when the vesicles (pores from gas bubbles in lava) of a volcanic rock or other extrusive igneous rock are infilled with a secondary mineral, such as calcite, quartz, chlorite, or one of the zeolites. Amygdules usually form after the rock has been emplaced, and are often associated with low-temperature alteration. Amygdules may often be concentrically zoned. Rocks containing amygdules can be described as amygdaloidal.

The word is derived from the Latin word amygdala, meaning "almond tree", and the Greek word αμυγδαλή, meaning "almond" – reflecting the typical shape of an infilled vesicle. Amygdule is more common in American usage, while amygdale is more common in British usage.

== See also ==
- Phenocryst – Crystal larger than the rock grains that surround it in an igneous rock
- Volcanic gas – Gases given off by active volcanoes
