= List of British coronations =

This is a list by date of coronations of British monarchs from the 10th century to the present.

== Monarchs of England (900–1603) ==
Monarch	Consort	Date of accession	Date of coronation	Presiding cleric
Æthelstan		17 July 924	4 September 925; Kingston upon Thames	Athelm, Archbishop of Canterbury
Edmund I		27 October 939	Possibly 1 December 939; Kingston upon Thames	Oda, Archbishop of Canterbury
Eadred		26 May 946	16 August 946; Kingston upon Thames	Oda, Archbishop of Canterbury
Eadwig		23 November 955	26 January 956; Kingston upon Thames	Oda, Archbishop of Canterbury
Edgar	Ælfthryth	1 October 959	Whit Sunday, 11 May 973; Bath Abbey	Dunstan, Archbishop of Canterbury
Edward the Martyr		8 July 975	August 975; Kingston upon Thames	Dunstan, Archbishop of Canterbury and Oswald, Archbishop of York
Æthelred the Unready		18 March 978	April 978; Kingston upon Thames	Dunstan, Archbishop of Canterbury and Oswald, Archbishop of York
Edmund Ironside		23 April 1016	25 April 1016; Old St Paul's Cathedral	Lyfing, Archbishop of Canterbury
Cnut		30 November 1016	Possibly January 1017; Old St Paul's Cathedral	Lyfing, Archbishop of Canterbury
Harthacnut		17 March 1040	Possibly June 1040; Canterbury Cathedral	Eadsige, Archbishop of Canterbury
Edward the Confessor		8 June 1042	Easter Sunday, 3 April 1043; Old Minster, Winchester	Eadsige, Archbishop of Canterbury
	Edith of Wessex		January 1045; Old Minster, Winchester	Eadsige, Archbishop of Canterbury
Harold II		5 January 1066	Saturday, 6 January 1066 probably at Westminster Abbey	Ealdred, Archbishop of York or Stigand, Archbishop of Canterbury
William I - article	(Note: Married, but not jointly crowned)	Nov-Dec 1066	Christmas Day, Monday, 25 December 1066	Ealdred, Archbishop of York
(Note: Separate coronation of queen consort)	Matilda of Flanders		Sunday, 11 May 1068	Ealdred, Archbishop of York
William II	(Note: Never married)	9 September 1087	Sunday, 26 September 1087	Lanfranc, Archbishop of Canterbury
Henry I	(Note: Unmarried at time of coronation)	2 August 1100	Sunday, 5 August 1100	Maurice, Bishop of London
	Matilda of Scotland	11 November 1100 marriage	Sunday, 11 November 1100	Anselm, Archbishop of Canterbury
	Adeliza of Louvain	24 January 1121 marriage	Sunday, 30 January 1121	Ralph d'Escures, Archbishop of Canterbury
Stephen			Saint Stephen's Day; Thursday, 26 December 1135	William de Corbeil, Archbishop of Canterbury
	Matilda of Boulogne		Sunday, 22 March 1136	?
Henry II	Eleanor of Aquitaine	25 October 1154	Sunday, 19 December 1154	Theobald of Bec, Archbishop of Canterbury
Henry the Young King			Sunday, 14 June 1170	Roger de Pont L'Evêque, Archbishop of York
Henry the Young King	Margaret of France		Sunday, 27 August 1172; Winchester Cathedral	Rotrou, Archbishop of Rouen
Richard I		6 July 1189	Sunday, 3 September 1189	Baldwin of Exeter, Archbishop of Canterbury
	Berengaria of Navarre	12 May 1191 marriage	Sunday, 12 May 1191; Kingdom of Cyprus	
John		6 April 1199	Ascension Day, Thursday, 27 May 1199	Hubert Walter, Archbishop of Canterbury
	Isabella of Angoulême	24 August 1200 marriage	Sunday, 8 October 1200	Hubert Walter, Archbishop of Canterbury
Henry III		19 October 1216	Friday, 28 October 1216; Church of St. Peter in Gloucester (now Gloucester Cathedral)	Cardinal Guala Bicchieri or Peter des Roches, Bishop of Winchester
Henry III		19 October 1216	Sunday, 17 May 1220	Stephen Langton, Archbishop of Canterbury
	Eleanor of Provence	14 January 1236 marriage	Sunday, 20 January 1236	Edmund Rich, Archbishop of Canterbury
Edward I	Eleanor of Castile	16 November 1272	Sunday, 19 August 1274	Robert Kilwardby, Archbishop of Canterbury
Edward II	Isabella of France	7 July 1307	Sunday, 25 February 1308	Henry Woodlock, Bishop of Winchester
Edward III		20 January 1327	Sunday, 1 February 1327	Walter Reynolds, Archbishop of Canterbury
	Philippa of Hainault	24 January 1328 marriage	Sunday, 18 February 1330	Simon Mepeham, Archbishop of Canterbury
Richard II		21 June 1377	Thursday, 16 July 1377	Simon Sudbury, Archbishop of Canterbury
	Anne of Bohemia	20 January 1382 marriage	Thursday, 22 January 1382	William Courtenay, Archbishop of Canterbury
	Isabella of Valois	1 November 1396 marriage	Monday, 8 January 1397	Thomas Arundel, Archbishop of Canterbury
Henry IV		30 September 1399	St Edward's Day, Monday, 13 October 1399	Thomas Arundel, Archbishop of Canterbury
	Joanna of Navarre	7 February 1403 marriage	Monday, 26 February 1403	Thomas Arundel, Archbishop of Canterbury
Henry V		20 March 1413	Passion Sunday, Sunday, 9 April 1413	Thomas Arundel, Archbishop of Canterbury
	Catherine of Valois	2 June 1420 marriage	Sunday, 23 February 1421	Henry Chichele, Archbishop of Canterbury
Henry VI		31 August 1422	Sunday, 6 November 1429	Henry Chichele, Archbishop of Canterbury
Henry VI		21 October 1422	Sunday, 16 December 1431 as King of France; Notre Dame de Paris	Henry Beaufort, Bishop of Winchester
	Margaret of Anjou	23 April 1445 marriage	Sunday, 30 May 1445	John Stafford, Archbishop of Canterbury
Edward IV		4 March 1461	Sunday, 28 June 1461	Thomas Bourchier, Archbishop of Canterbury
	Elizabeth Woodville	1 May 1464 marriage	Sunday, 26 May 1465	Thomas Bourchier, Archbishop of Canterbury
Richard III	Anne Neville	25 June 1483	Sunday, 6 July 1483	Thomas Bourchier, Archbishop of Canterbury
Henry VII		22 August 1485	Sunday, 30 October 1485	Thomas Bourchier, Archbishop of Canterbury
	Elizabeth of York	18 January 1486	Sunday, 25 November 1487	John Morton, Archbishop of Canterbury
Henry VIII - article	Catherine of Aragon	21 April 1509 (King); 11 June 1509 (Queen) marriage	Sunday, 24 June 1509	William Warham, Archbishop of Canterbury
	Anne Boleyn- article	28 May 1533 marriage	Sunday, 1 June 1533	Thomas Cranmer, Archbishop of Canterbury
Edward VI - article		28 January 1547	Sunday, 20 February 1547	Thomas Cranmer, Archbishop of Canterbury
Mary I - article		19 July 1553	Sunday, 1 October 1553	Stephen Gardiner, Bishop of Winchester
Elizabeth I - article		17 November 1558	Sunday, 15 January 1559	Owen Oglethorpe, Bishop of Carlisle

== Monarchs of Scotland (1057–1651) ==
Monarch	Consort	Date of inauguration or coronation	Place	Presiding cleric
Lulach		8 September 1057	Scone Abbey	?
Malcolm III		25 April 1058?	Scone, Perth and Kinross	?
David I	Maud, Countess of Huntingdon	April or May 1124	Scone Abbey	Possibly Gregoir, Bishop of Dunkeld
Malcolm IV		Wednesday, 27 May 1153	Scone Abbey	Possibly Robert of Scone, Bishop of St Andrews
William I		Friday, 24 December 1165	Scone Abbey	Richard the Chaplain, Bishop of St Andrews
Alexander II		Saturday, 6 December 1214	Scone Abbey	William de Malveisin, Bishop of St Andrews
Alexander III		Wednesday, 4 September 1241	Scone Abbey	David de Bernham, Bishop of St Andrews
John (Balliol)	Isabella de Warenne	Sunday, 30 November 1292	Scone Abbey	William Fraser, Bishop of St Andrews
Robert I	Elizabeth de Burgh	Sunday, 27 March 1306	Scone Abbey	No bishop present
David II	Joan of England	Sunday, 24 November 1331	Scone Abbey	James Bane, Bishop of St Andrews
Robert II	Euphemia de Ross	Wednesday, 26 March 1371	Scone Abbey	William de Landallis, Bishop of St Andrews
Robert III	Annabella Drummond	Thursday, 18 August 1390	Scone Abbey	Walter Trail, Bishop of St Andrews
James I		Tuesday, 2 May or Sunday, 21 May 1424	Scone Abbey	Henry Wardlaw, Bishop of St Andrews
James II		Tuesday, 25 March 1437	Holyrood Abbey	Michael Ochiltree, Bishop of Dunblane
James III		Sunday, 10 August 1460	Kelso Abbey	James Kennedy, Bishop of St Andrews
James IV		Tuesday, 24 June 1488	Scone Abbey	William Scheves, Archbishop of St Andrews
James V		Wednesday, 21 September 1513	Chapel Royal, Stirling Castle	James Beaton, Archbishop of St Andrews
	Mary of Guise	Sunday, 22 February 1540	Holyrood Abbey	David Beaton, Archbishop of St Andrews
Mary I - article		Sunday, 9 September 1543	Chapel Royal, Stirling Castle	John Hamilton, Archbishop of St Andrews
James VI - article		Tuesday, 29 July 1567	Kirk of the Holy Rude, Stirling	Adam Bothwell, Bishop of Orkney
	Anne of Denmark - article	Sunday, 17 May 1590, O.S.	Holyrood Abbey	Adam Bothwell, Bishop of Orkney
Charles I	(Note: Spouse Henrietta Maria was not in Scotland for the coronation.)	Tuesday, 18 June 1633, O.S.	Holyrood Abbey	John Spottiswoode, Archbishop of St Andrews
Charles II - article		Wednesday, 1 January 1651, O.S.	Scone Abbey	Archibald Campbell, 1st Marquess of Argyll (Note: Episcopacy abolished)

== Monarchs of England, Ireland and Scotland (1603–1707) ==
From 1603 onwards England, Ireland and Scotland were personally united under the same ruler (see Personal union).

Monarch	Consort	Date of accession	Time intervening	Date of coronation	Presiding cleric
James VI and I - article	Anne of Denmark	24 March 1602/1603, O.S. (Note: In England at this time, the new year began on 25 March. Dates between 1 January and 25 March are accordingly given a double year, the first by the old mode of reckoning, the second by the current mode.)	4 mo 1 d	Saint James's Day, Monday, 25 July 1603, O.S.	John Whitgift, Archbishop of Canterbury
Charles I	(Note: Spouse Henrietta Maria, a Catholic, did not participate in the Anglican coronation ceremony.)	27 March 1625, O.S.	10 mo 6 d	Candlemas, Thursday, 2 February 1625/1626, O.S.	George Abbot, Archbishop of Canterbury
Charles II - article		30 January 1648/1649, O.S. (de jure); 8 May 1660, O.S. (de facto)	11 mo 15 d	Saint George's Day, Tuesday, 23 April 1661, O.S.	William Juxon, Archbishop of Canterbury
James II and VII - article	Mary of Modena	6 February 1684/1685, O.S.	2 mo 17 d	Saint George's Day, Thursday, 23 April 1685, O.S.	William Sancroft, Archbishop of Canterbury
William III and II and Mary II	(reigned jointly)	13 February 1688/1689, O.S.	1 mo 29 d	Thursday, 11 April 1689, O.S.	Henry Compton, Bishop of London
Anne	(Note: The queen regnant's consort was not accorded equal title and consequently was not crowned.)	8 March 1701/1702, O.S.	1 mo 15 d	Saint George's Day, Thursday, 23 April 1702, O.S.	Thomas Tenison, Archbishop of Canterbury

== Monarchs of Great Britain and Ireland (1707–1801) ==
Monarch	Consort	Date of accession	Time intervening	Date of coronation	Presiding cleric
George I	(Note: Spouse Sophia Dorothea of Celle divorced in 1694.)	1 August 1714, O.S.	2 mo 19 d	Wednesday, 20 October 1714, O.S.	Thomas Tenison, Archbishop of Canterbury
George II - article	Caroline of Ansbach	11 June 1727, O.S.	4 mo	Wednesday, 11 October 1727, O.S.	William Wake, Archbishop of Canterbury
George III - article	Charlotte of Mecklenburg-Strelitz	25 October 1760 (King); 8 September 1761 (Queen) marriage	10 mo 28 d 14 d	Tuesday, 22 September 1761	Thomas Secker, Archbishop of Canterbury

== Monarchs of the United Kingdom (1801–present) ==
Monarch	Consort	Date of accession	Time intervening	Date of coronation	Presiding cleric
George IV - article	(Note: Caroline of Brunswick, who was separated from the King, was turned away from coronation by force.)	29 January 1820	1 y 5 mo 20 d	Thursday, 19 July 1821	Charles Manners-Sutton, Archbishop of Canterbury
William IV - article	Adelaide of Saxe-Meiningen	26 June 1830	1 y 2 mo 13 d	Thursday, 8 September 1831	William Howley, Archbishop of Canterbury
Victoria - article		20 June 1837	1 y 8 d	Thursday, 28 June 1838	William Howley, Archbishop of Canterbury
Edward VII - article	Alexandra of Denmark	22 January 1901	1 y 6 mo 18 d	Saturday, 9 August 1902 (Note: Originally scheduled for 26 June 1902, but postponed due to the King's life-threatening illness.)	Frederick Temple, Archbishop of Canterbury
George V - article	Mary of Teck	6 May 1910	1 y 1 mo 16 d	Thursday, 22 June 1911	Randall Davidson, Archbishop of Canterbury
Edward VIII - article	(Note: Unmarried at the time of his abdication.)	20 January 1936	—N/a	—N/a	—N/a
George VI - article	Elizabeth Bowes-Lyon	11 December 1936	5 mo 1 d	Wednesday, 12 May 1937 (Note: Date originally planned for coronation of Edward VIII.)	Cosmo Lang, Archbishop of Canterbury
Elizabeth II - article		6 February 1952	1 y 3 mo 27 d	Tuesday, 2 June 1953	Geoffrey Fisher, Archbishop of Canterbury
Charles III - article	Camilla Shand	8 September 2022	7 m 28 d	Saturday, 6 May 2023	Justin Welby, Archbishop of Canterbury

== See also ==
- List of people involved in coronations of the British monarch
