= Cellach =

Cellach (hypocoristic Cellachán) is an Irish name. It might refer to:

- Cellach of Killala (fl. mid-6th century), supposed first Bishop of Killala in Ireland
- Cellach I of Cennrígmonaid, a 9th/10th-century bishop
- Cellach II of Cennrígmonaid, a 10th-century bishop
- Cellach mac Máele Coba, a 7th-century High King of Ireland
- Cellach mac Fáelchair, king of Osraige
- Cellach mac Rogallaig (d. 705), a king of Connacht
- Cellach Cualann, a 7th/8th-century king of Leinster
- Cellach mac Dúnchada, king of Leinster
- Cellach mac Brain, king of Leinster
- Cellach mac Faelan, king of Leinster
- Cellachán Caisil, a 10th-century king of Munster
- Cellach húa Rúanada, Irish poet (d. 1079, Annals of Ulster)
- Saint Cellach, 11th/12th-century bishop of Armagh
- Saint Ceallach, hermit of Glendalough
- Cel Spellman (b. 1995), English actor, TV and radio host
