= Archdeacon of St Andrews =

The Archdeacon of St Andrews was the head of the Archdeaconry of St Andrews, a subdivision of the Diocese of St Andrews, from the 12th to the 17th century. The position was one of the most important positions within the medieval Scottish church; because of his area's large population and high number of parish churches, the Archdeacon of St Andrews may have exercised more power than many Scottish bishops. The following is a list of known archdeacons:

== List of Archdeacons of St Andrews ==
- Matthew, 1147 x 1152-1172
- Walter de Roxburgh, 1173-1179 x 1188
- Hugh de Roxburgh, 1189 x 1194-1199
- Ranulf de Wat, 1199-1209
- Laurence de Thorenton, 1209-1238 x 1240
- Adam, 1240-1248
- Abel de Golynn, 1250-1254
- William Wishart, 1254-1273
- Alpín of Strathearn, 1278
- Gregory, 1279-1295
- John Fraser, 1296-1297
- Roger de Kingston, 1299
- Adam de Mauchan/Machane, 1301-1304
- ?
- Robert de Lamberton, 1319-1323
- James Bane, 1325-1328.
- William de Lindsay 1330.
- William de Pilmuir, 1340-1345 x 1353
- Henry Stupy, x 1353.
- William Wys, 1353-1354
- William de Greenlaw, 1353-1373
  - William de Chisholm, 1367
- John de Peebles (Peblis), 1374 -1378 x 1379
- Andrew de Trebrun, 1378
- Thomas Stewart, 1380-1430
- George Newton 1430 x 1431-1433
- Richard de Creich, 1430-1432.
- Thomas de Myrton (Merton), 1431-1433
- William de Foulis, 1432-1441
- John Legat, 1443-1451
- Hugh Kennedy, x 1452 (?), 1454
- John Kennedy, 1454
- Hugh Douglas, 1454-1456 x 1457
- Walter Stewart, 1456 x 1457-1472 x 1474
- Hugh Douglas, 1466
- William Scheves 1472 x 1474-1478
- Robert Blackadder, 1477-1480
- Andrew Stewart, 1479
- Alexander Inglis, 1480-1496.
  - John Ireland, 1483-1485
- Robert de Fontibus (Wells), 1497-1501
- Alexander Stewart, 1502-1504
- Gavin Dunbar, 1504-1519
- Thomas Halkerston 1519-1521 x 1524
- John Cantuly, 1524-1537
- George Durie, 1526-1559
- Robert Pitcairn, 1539-1584.
- George Young, 1584-1603.
- Alexander Gledstanes, 1612-1638

== Bibliography ==
- Watt, D.E.R., Fasti Ecclesiae Scotinanae Medii Aevi ad annum 1638, 2nd Draft, (St Andrews, 1969), pp. 304–9

== See also ==
- Archdeacon of Lothian
- Bishop of St Andrews
