= Richard de Inverkeithing =

Richard de Inverkeithing was a 13th-century cleric from Scotland, probably from Inverkeithing in Fife. He was a Chamberlain of King Alexander II of Scotland and Bishop of Dunkeld.

He was King Alexander's chamberlain in the last year of that king's life. The death of Alexander in 1249 happened to coincide with the death of Galfred de Liberatione, Bishop of Dunkeld, in the same year. So instead of falling from a high-profile job into obscurity, Richard was elected to the diocese of Dunkeld sometime in the year 1250. The exact date of his consecration is not known, but we do know that he was consecrated between 2 August 1251 and 2 August 1252.

In 1255 Richard was one of the figures chosen to act as guardian to the young Alexander III, making Richard one of the most important men in the Kingdom of Scotland. In 1262, Bishop Richard founded Whitefriars' monastery, Perth, the first friary of the Carmelite Order in Scotland. In 1265 he used his own wealth to build a new choir in the church of Inchcolm Abbey (which was part of the diocese of Dunkeld), and the following year moved the bones of previous bishops of Dunkeld into the new choir. Shortly after the Easter of 1168, along with the Bishop of Dunblane, he attended a church council in the English town of London, organized by the papal legate, Ottobone.

He died on 16 April 1272. He was buried in Dunkeld Cathedral, but his heart was taken to be buried in the new choir at Inchcolm. The Lanercost Chronicle (97) alleges that he was poisoned by King Alexander III with the aim of gaining Richard's movable assets, but this allegation is usually thought to be "credulous gossip". Richard was succeeded by Robert de Stuteville.

Religious titles
Preceded by Galfred de Liberatione	Bishop of Dunkeld; 1250/2–1272	Succeeded by Robert de Stuteville
