= Máel Muire (bishop of the Scots) =

Máel Muire is the fifth alleged bishop of St Andrews, though at that period the bishop of the Scots did not necessarily have one episcopal seat. He is mentioned in the bishop-list of the 15th-century historian Walter Bower as the successor of Cellach II, the latter of whom reigned for at least 25 years. Nothing else is known about Máel Muire. However, he cannot have been bishop before 988/9, because that is the earliest likely date for the end of the episcopate of his predecessor Cellach. The next firm date for any bishop of the Scots is 1055, when the Annals of Tigernach records the death of bishop Máel Dúin, and obviously this date is too far ahead to be of very much use.

== Notes ==
Religious titles
Preceded by Cellach II	Bishop of the Scots fl. late-900s	Succeeded by Máel Ísu II
