= Auchtertool =

Village in Fife, Scotland

Coordinates: 56.1028°N 3.2577°W

Auchtertool: Scottish Gaelic: Uachdar Tuil; Scots: Auchtertool
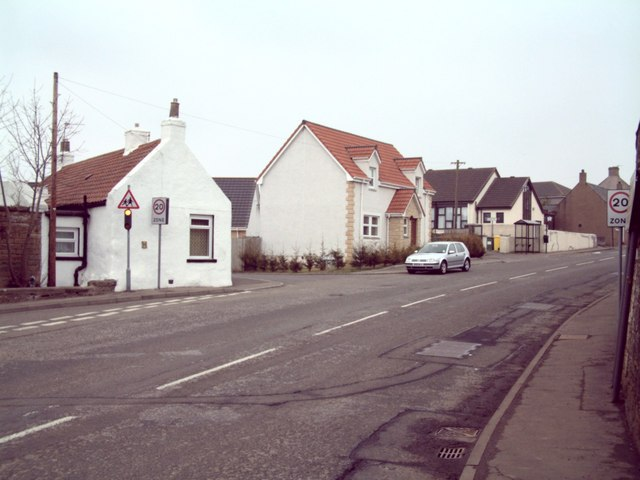
- Main Street, Auchtertool

- Location within Fife
- Population: 635
- OS grid reference: NT207902
- Council area: Fife
- Lieutenancy area: Fife
- Country: Scotland
- Sovereign state: United Kingdom
- Post town: Kirkcaldy
- Postcode district: KY2
- Police: Scotland
- Fire: Scottish
- Ambulance: Scottish
- UK Parliament: Kirkcaldy and Cowdenbeath
- Scottish Parliament: Kirkcaldy

Auchtertool (/ɒxtərˈtʊl/; Scottish Gaelic: Uachdar Tuil) is a small village in Fife, Scotland. It is 4 miles west of Kirkcaldy. The name is from the Gaelic uachdar, meaning upland or heights above the Tiel burn (from Gaelic tuil meaning torrent). The Tiel Burn flows a few hundred yards south of the kirk and village, which was formerly known as Milton of Auchtertool.

== History ==
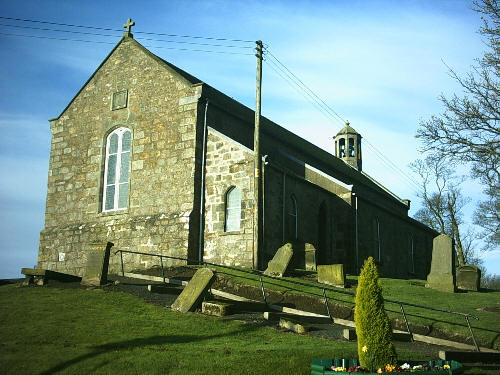
The present kirk in Auchtertool replaced an earlier building said to date to 1178

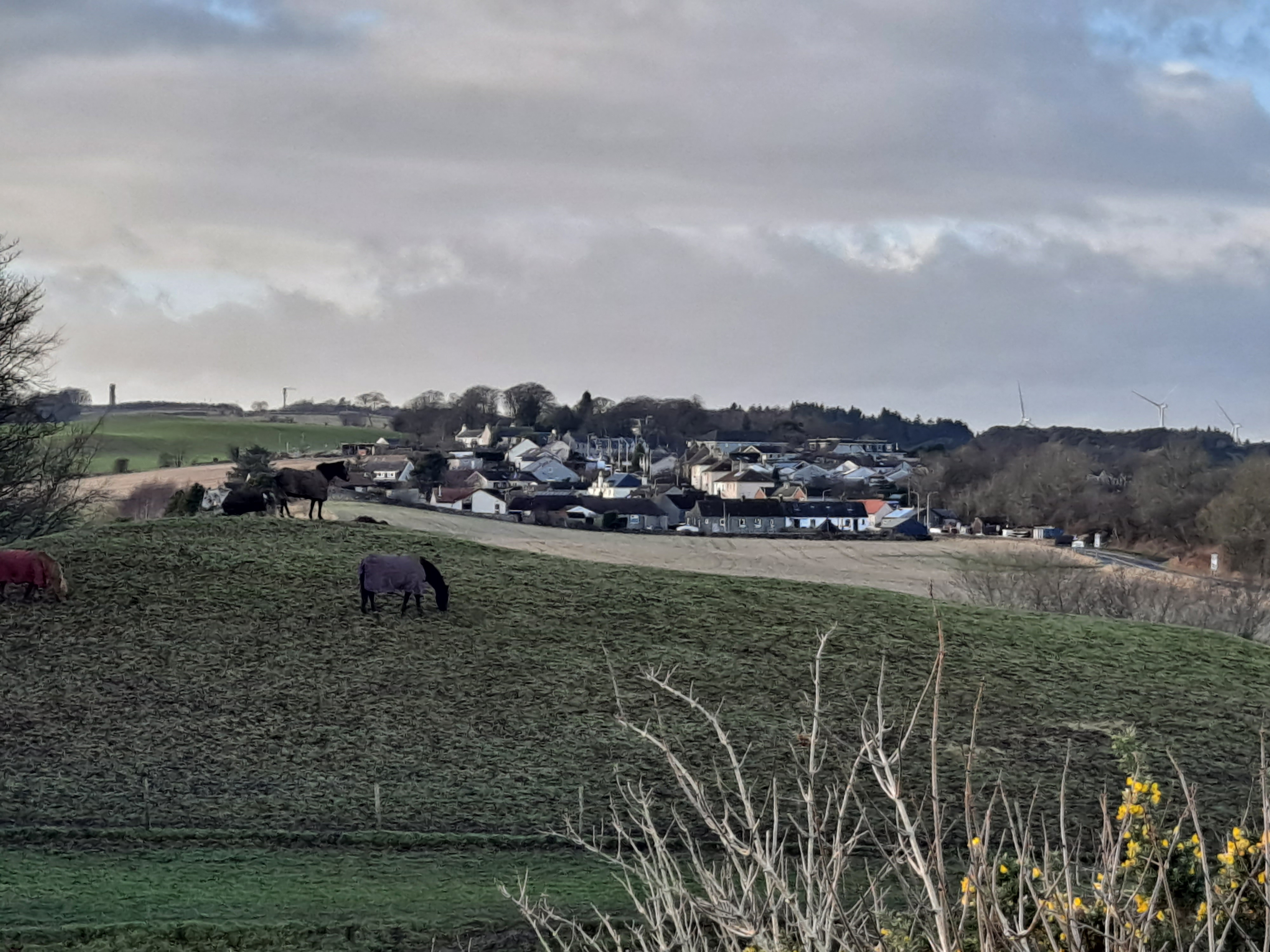
The village from the east, on the public footpath from Kirkcaldy

David I gave the lands of Auchtertool to Bishop Gregory of Dunkeld between 1132 and 1153, meaning it formed, alongside neighbouring Aberdour, a detached portion of that diocese which was otherwise entirely surrounded by the diocese of St Andrews. The church was then given over by Dunkeld to the priory of Inchcolm by 1179, when it was described as belonging to that foundation, along with two bovates of land. However, the greater lands of the parish remained with the bishops of Dunkeld, who maintained an episcopal residence in the parish at Hallyards Castle.

Hallyards Castle formerly stood north-west of the main village. Supposed originally to have been a hunting seat of Malcolm Canmore, it was the residence of the Bishops of Dunkeld until 1539. King James V visited the castle after his defeat at the Battle of Solway Moss in late November 1542. According to John Knox, when the lady of the house tried to comfort the king, he announced that he would be dead in fifteen days. Later, his servant asked where James would spend Christmas. "He answerit, with at disdainfull Smirk, I cannot tell, chuse ye the Plaice; but this I can tell you, or [by] Yulle-Day ye will be Maisterless, and the Realme without a King." The king returned to Falkland where he learnt of the birth of his daughter Mary on 8 December. He died on 14 December. The castle was mostly demolished in 1847; some remains can be found on farmland north-west of the village centre.

At the time of the Jacobite rising of 1715 the rebel John Erskine, Earl of Mar was in Perth when he heard that a loyalist ship loaded with arms had dropped anchor at Burntisland. He set out to capture it, advancing 500 Highland soldiers into Auchtertool to be held in reserve. The men ran amok, plundering the village, including the manse.

Tradition maintains that a funeral attended by the writer Walter Scott was held at the kirk and solemnised according to the Roman Catholic rite. This illegal ceremony took place at dead of night to avoid detection by the Protestant authorities. Legend has it that the funeral procession can be seen on an August night heading towards the kirk from Hallyards Castle.

Alexander Boswell was mortally wounded in a duel in Auchtertool in 1822. He died in nearby Balmuto House. The duel was one of the last in Scotland.

The modern village grew up around what was originally the milton of the parish, meaning the settlement surrounding the local mill, as opposed to the kirkton, the settlement surround the kirk, which lies at some distance from the village. The original structure was largely reconstructed in 1833 as a plain box chapel. It has two battlemented porches on the south side and an octagonal birdcage bellcote on the west gable. The north aisle was added in 1905–6. The graveyard contains 17th century table stones; one commemorates David Martin, minister of Auchtertool who died in 1636. It is carved with a relief of the minister in knee breeches and gown with his feet on a skull. The Gothic Revival manse was built in 1812. Auchtertool House is a large early 19th century villa.

From 1650, the village had a brewery, gaining a reputation for the quality of its ale, porter and table beer, not only throughout Fife but shipping as far as London. From 1845 the brewery was converted to a malt whisky distillery, commencing operation in 1851, and maintaining its reputation for a quality product. Distilling ceased in 1927 but the maltings and bonded warehouse continued operation until 1973. The warehouses were used as a canteen by Polish soldiers, encamped nearby during the Second World War. The buildings are now largely demolished, only a small brick office remaining.

Auchtertool's only school is Auchtertool Primary School. High school pupils travel to Balwearie High School in Kirkcaldy.

In 2026, plans were lodged to build a 600MW hyperscale data centre next to the village, which attracted more than 1,600 objections.

== See also ==
- List of places in Fife
- List of places in Scotland
