= Máel Ísu =

Máel Ísu, Maol Íosa or Máel Íosa, meaning devotee of Jesus, Latinised as Malise, may refer to:

- Máel Ísu I of Cennrígmonaid, 10th century bishop of Cennrígmonaid
- Máel Ísu II of Cennrígmonaid, late 10th-early 11th century bishop of Cennrígmonaid
- Máel Ísu Ua hAinmere, 12th century Archbishop of Cashel and Bishop of Waterford
- Máel Ísu Ua Fogluda, 12th century Archbishop of Cashel
- Máel Ísu I, Earl of Strathearn, 12th century Scottish mormaer
- Maol Íosa II, Earl of Strathearn (d. 1271), Scottish mormaer
- Maol Íosa III, Earl of Strathearn (d. 1312), Scottish mormaer
- Maol Íosa IV, Earl of Strathearn (d. 1329), Scottish mormaer
- Maol Íosa V, Earl of Strathearn (d. 1350), Scottish mormaer and Norwegian Jarl
- Malise Sparre (d. 1391), grandson of the above, competitor for the Jarldom of Orkney
- Malise mac Gilleain, 13th century Scottish clan chief
- Malise Graham, 1st Earl of Menteith (d. 1490), Scottish nobleman
- Malise Ruthven (b. 1942), Irish academic
- Mael Isu Bratain Ui Echach (fl. 1130), 12th century Irish Master goldsmith (see Cross of Cong, Shrine of Manchan).
- Maolíosa McHugh (born 20th century), Sinn Féin politician
