= William Bell (bishop) =

William Bell (died 1343) was a 14th-century Bishop of St Andrews. His origins are not clear, but he was holding the canonry in the diocese of Glasgow by 20 January 1312. He was a commissary of Bishop William de Lamberton in a case between Dunfermline Abbey and one of the abbey's vicars in early 1312. He was part of William de Lamberton's close group of associates, his familia. In 1328, he was involved in playing an administrative role in drawing up a treaty at Holyrood Abbey between King Robert I of Scotland and the English crown.

By this point in time he was holding the title "Master", and hence an academic qualification. In the following year he became Dean of Dunkeld Cathedral. He still held the latter position until the early 1341's, but probably resigned soon after Bell moved to become a canon of St Andrews. He was elected to succeed James Bane as Bishop of St Andrews perhaps sometime soon after the death of Bane on 22 September 1332, though Walter Bower claimed he was elected earlier, on 19 August.

Bell travelled to the Papal court based at Avignon to receive Papal confirmation, but in doing this his efforts were blocked by opposition and counter-nominations from representatives of the English crown. He does not appear to have obtained Papal confirmation, and in February 1342 resigned the rights acquired by election to facilitate the Pope's preferred candidate William de Landallis. He returned to Scotland with the new bishop, re-entered St Andrews Cathedral Priory as an Augustinian canon, and died on 7 February 1343. Bell was apparently blind at the time of his death only a decade later, and it is not known if this had anything to do with the Papacy's decision.

Religious titles
Preceded by James Bane	Bishop of St Andrews (Cill Rìmhinn); 1332–1342; Probably not consecrated	Succeeded by William de Landallis
