= Mael (name) =

Male given name

The name Mael resembles a number of old Celtic names from Brittany, Wales and Ireland.

"Mael" is a Breton boys' name meaning "chief" or "prince". The name for girls is "Maela". The Breton name is popular in French as "Maël", with French girl-forms including "Maëlys" and "Maëlle", largely after the Breton Saint Maël.

The Welsh boys name Mael was borne by the legendary son of Roycol.

The old Irish word "máel" (now spelt "maol"), meaning "bald" and hence "monk", was sometimes put before Gaelic names to form new names and indicate a servant or follower of a saint. These variants include "Maolcholuim" (spelt "Malcolm" by the English), which means "monk/follower of Columba".

In a Portuguese-Spanish context, Mael is a hypocoristic form for Ismael and Emanuel/Manuel.

== Máel ==
- Máel Brigte, several people
- Máel Coluim mac Alaxandair, Pretender to the Scottish throne
- Máel Coluim of Moray, Scottish king
- Máel Dub, Reputed Irish monk of the 7th century
- Máel Dúin, several people
- Máel Gualae, Irish king
- Máel Ísu, several people
- Máel Mórda mac Murchada, King of the province of Leinster in Ireland
- Máel Muire, Earl of Atholl, Scottish noble
- Máel Pátraic, Irish abbot
- Máel Ruain (died 792), Abbot-bishop of Tallaght
- Máel Ruba (c. 642-722), Irish saint
- Máel Sechnaill mac Domnaill, High King of Ireland from 980 to 1002
- Máel Sechnaill mac Máele Ruanaid, High King of Ireland
- Máel Snechtai, Ruler of Moray

== Mael ==
- Mael Corboz (born 1994), American football player

== Maël ==
- Maël Ambonguilat (born 1997), Gabonese Olympic swimmer
- Maël de Calan (born 1980), French politician
- Maël de Gevigney (born 1999), French professional footballer
- Maël Gouyette (born 1999), French middle-distance runner
- Maël Henry (born 2004), Canadian soccer player
- Maël Illien (born 1990), French footballer
- Maël Renouard (born 1979), French writer and translator
- Maël Tyrode (born 2000), French Nordic combined skier
