= Gamelin =

Gamelin is a surname. Notable people with the surname include:

- Gamelin (bishop) (died 1271), Scottish bishop
- Alexander Gamelin (born 1993), American ice dancer
- Émilie Gamelin (1800–1851), Canadian social worker
- Jacques Gamelin (1738–1803), French artist
- Maurice Gamelin (1872–1958), French general, in command at the start of World War II
- Theodore Gamelin (born 1939), American mathematician

== Other ==
- Gamelin (electoral district), Canada
- Ffordd Gam Elin, a Roman road in the Berwyn area in Wales
