= Mael =

Mael may refer to:

== People ==
- Mael (name), a Celtic given name
- Maël (saint), fifth-century Breton saint
- Ron Mael (born 1945), American musician, member of the band Sparks
- Russell Mael (born 1948), American musician, member of the band Sparks

== Fictional characters ==
- Mael (The Vampire Chronicles), character from Anne Rice's The Vampire Chronicles series
- Mael, sea god in Steven Erikson's Malazan Book of the Fallen series
- Mael, fallen Archangel from The Seven Deadly Sins (manga)

== Other ==
- Mæl Station, a railway terminus in Telemark, Norway
- Maël-Carhaix, a commune in Brittany, France
