= Archdeaconry of St Andrews =

The Archdeaconry of St Andrews was a sub-division of the diocese of St Andrews, one of two archdeaconries within the diocese. The St Andrews archdeaconry was headed by the Archdeacon of St Andrews, a subordinate of the Bishop of St Andrews. In the medieval period, the Archdeaconry of St Andrews contained five deaneries with a total of 124 parish churches. The deaneries were Mearns (14 churches), Angus (38 churches), Gowrie (20 churches), Fife (28 churches) and Fothriff (24 churches).

== See also ==
- Archdeaconry of Lothian (other St Andrews archdeaconry)
- Archdeacon of St Andrews, for a list of archdeacons
- Bishop of St Andrews
