= Cormac of Dunkeld =

Cormac, Bishop of Dunkeld (fl. x1114-1131x) is the earliest recorded Bishop of Dunkeld in the 12th century, although he was not the first bishop of Dunkeld. It is possible, that he was the first bishop of Dunkeld distinct from the abbot, but there is no evidence for this. He appears in two rather doubtful charters of King Alexander I of Scotland, in several charters of King David I of Scotland and in the Gaelic notitiae on the Book of Deer, rendering a floruit of on or before the year 1114, to on or after the year 1131. The last source calls him "Cormac escob Dúno Callenn", Cormac bishop of Dunkeld".

He seems to have been succeeded by Gregoir.

Religious titles
| Preceded by ? | Bishop of Dunkeld fl. x1114–1131x | Succeeded by Gregoir |
