= James Stewart, Duke of Ross =

Scottish archbishop

James Stewart
- Archbishop of St Andrews
- Church: Roman Catholic Church
- Archdiocese: St Andrews
- Appointed: 20 September 1497
- Term ended: January 1504
- Predecessor: William Scheves
- Successor: Alexander Stewart
- Other post: Commendator of Dunfermline (1500–1504)

Personal details
- Born: March 1476
- Died: January 1504 (aged 27)
- Parents: James III of Scotland; Margaret of Denmark

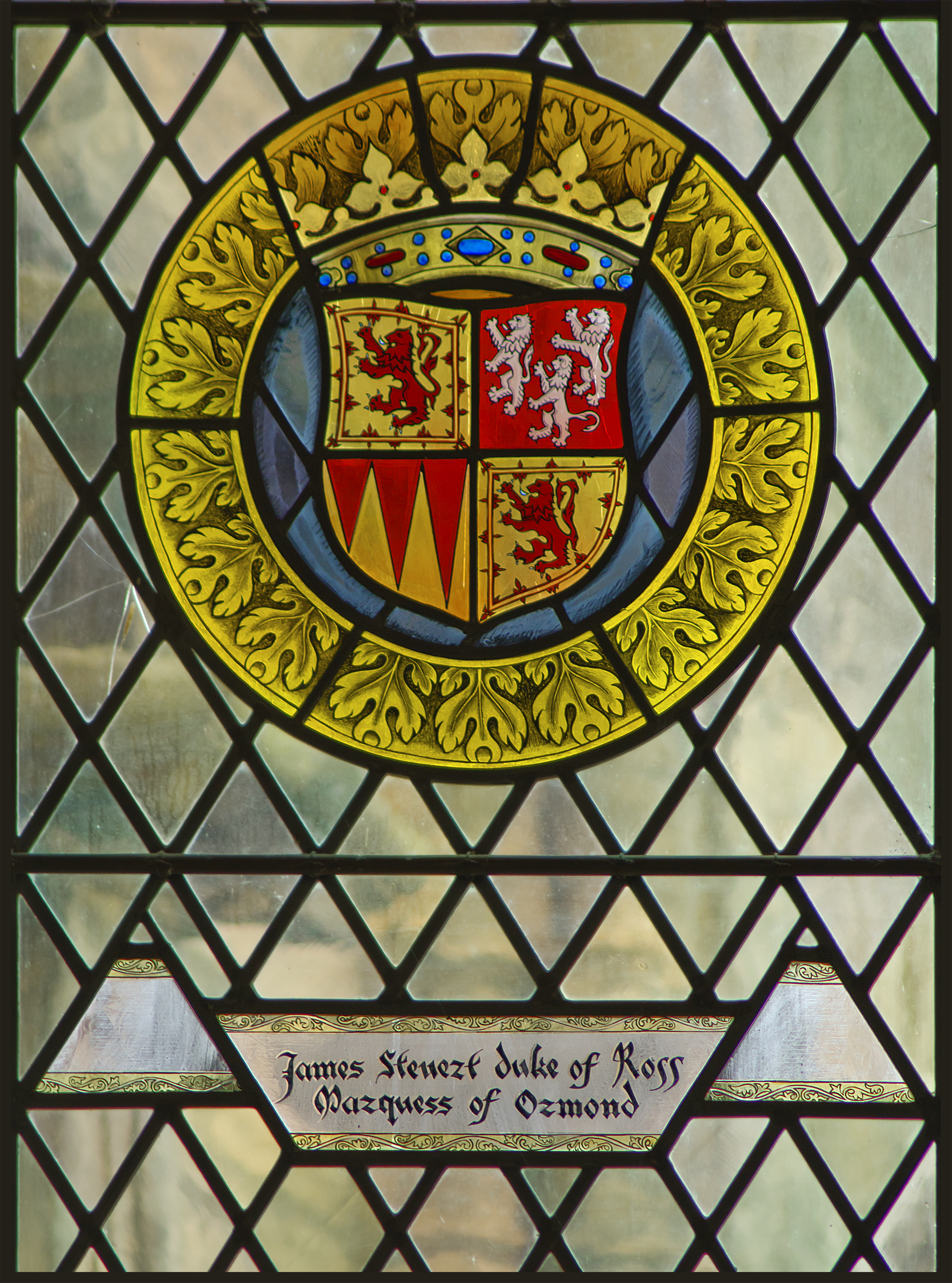
Stained glass window with arms of James Stewart, Duke of Ross, Great Hall, Stirling Castle

James Stewart, Duke of Ross (March 1476 – January 1504) was a Scottish prince, and the second son of King James III of Scotland and his wife, Margaret of Denmark. James was heir presumptive to his brother until his death, and was Archbishop of St Andrews and Lord Chancellor of Scotland.

== Life ==
He was made Marquess of Ormond at his baptism. He was created Earl of Ross in 1481 after that title was forfeited to the crown by John, Lord of the Isles.

Of his father's three sons, James of Ross was the favourite. James III tried to marry him to Edward IV's daughter, Catherine of York. This increasing preference shown to James of Ross was a factor in the rebellion of his elder brother (the future James IV) against their father; and later, as king, James IV was suspicious of his brother's loyalty.

Nonetheless, when the elder James succeeded to the crown in 1488, he raised James of Ross's title to Duke of Ross.

Around May 1497, his brother the King nominated James of Ross (then 21 years old) to be Archbishop of St Andrews. King James thought that would keep James of Ross from rebelling against him. At that time, James of Ross was a minor, and so the revenues of the archbishopric would be controlled by King James.

James of Ross also became Lord Chancellor of Scotland in 1502.

== Name ==
He was one of three brothers, his two brothers being King James IV of Scotland and John Stewart, Earl of Mar. It may seem surprising that there were two brothers both called James, but in late medieval Scotland it was not uncommon to have two brothers, or occasionally even three, with the same Christian name.

== Arms ==
The arms of James of Ross were: Quarterly 1st and 4th: Royal Arms of Scotland, 2nd: Gules, three lions rampant argent (Ross) 3rd: Or, three piles gules (Brechin).

Religious titles
Preceded by William Scheves	Archbishop of St. Andrews; 1497–1504	Succeeded by Alexander Stewart
Preceded by George Crichton	Commendator of Dunfermline; 1500–1504	Succeeded by James Beaton * *His immediate successor may have been Gilbert Strachan.
Academic offices
Preceded by William Scheves; Archbishop of St Andrews	Chancellor of the University of St Andrews; 1497–1504	Succeeded by Alexander Stewart; Archbishop of St Andrews
Political offices
Preceded by 2nd Earl of Huntly	Lord Chancellor of Scotland; 1502–1504	Succeeded by in 1510; Alexander Stewart
