= Gamelin (bishop) =

- Bishop of St Andrews
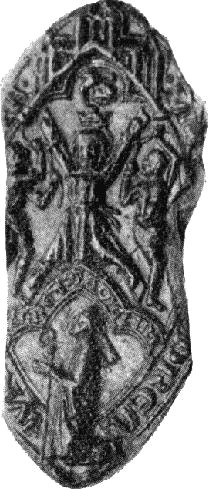
- Seal of bishop Gamelin.
- Diocese: St Andrews
- Appointed: 1255
- Term ended: 29 April 1271
- Predecessor: Abel de Golynn
- Successor: William Wishart

Orders
- Consecration: 26 December 1255 by William de Bondington

Personal details
- Died: 29 April 1271 Inchmurdo Palace, Fife

Gamelin (died 29 April 1271) was a 13th-century Bishop of St Andrews and a key political figure aligned with the Comyn family. He served as Chancellor of Scotland under King Alexander III of Scotland and was also a Papal chaplain. His career was deeply intertwined with both ecclesiastical duties and the political struggles of his time, particularly through his strong association with the Comyns.

== Early life and rise to power ==
Gamelin's career began during the reign of Alexander II, when he became a Papal chaplain by 1245. He held the church of Kilbucho in Peeblesshire and was connected to important political families like the Comyns and Fitz Gilberts, who played major roles in Scottish politics. By April 1245, he had become a canon of Glasgow, and by the early 1250s, he succeeded Robert, Abbot of Dunfermline, as Chancellor of Scotland.

Gamelin, Bishop of St Andrews, had a brother named Master John, who is recorded as a witness to one of the bishop’s official acts. It is possible that this Master John was the same individual as John de Glasgu, Gamelin’s chaplain and potentially the earliest documented bearer of the Glasgow surname.

== Bishop of St Andrews and political struggles ==
Gamelin was postulated to the bishopric of St Andrews in Lent 1255, and his election was confirmed by Pope Alexander IV on 1 July 1255, despite his apparent "defect of birth." He was consecrated by William de Bondington, Bishop of Glasgow, on 26 December 1255.

Gamelin’s political alliance with the Comyn family placed him at odds with the rival Durward faction, led by Alan Durward. In 1256, a year after the Durwards seized control, Gamelin was exiled from Scotland. He sought refuge at the papal court, where Pope Alexander IV issued an excommunication against those responsible for his expulsion.

== Return to Scotland and later years ==
In 1258, after the Comyns regained power, Gamelin returned to Scotland and resumed his duties as Bishop of St Andrews. His return was enabled by papal support, and he continued to support the Comyn faction in their political struggles. He remained Bishop of St Andrews until his death at Inchmurdo Palace, Fife, on 29 April 1271.

== Political alliances and the Comyn Family ==
Gamelin’s political career was deeply tied to his support for the Comyn family, who were one of the most influential noble families in 13th-century Scotland. His early connections to the church of Kilbucho linked him to figures like Gilbert Fitz Richer and Adam Fitz Gilbert, further cementing his association with the Comyns.

The Comyns’ political dominance has often been downplayed by chroniclers sympathetic to later figures like Robert the Bruce. However, contemporary sources suggest that the Comyns were a formidable force, and Gamelin’s career was inextricably linked with their political fortunes.

== Death and legacy ==
Gamelin died on 29 April 1271 at Inchmurdo Palace. He was succeeded by William Wishart as Bishop of St Andrews. Gamelin’s legacy is marked by his involvement in both the ecclesiastical hierarchy and the political struggles of medieval Scotland, as well as his steadfast loyalty to the Comyn family.

Religious titles
Preceded by Abel de Golynn	Bishop of St Andrews (Cell Rígmonaid); 1255–1271	Succeeded by William Wishart
