= Máel Dúin =

Máel Dúin may refer to:

- the protagonist of The Voyage of Máel Dúin (Old Irish: Immram Maele Dúin).
- Máel Dúin mac Áedo Bennán (died c.661), king of Iarmuman (West Munster)
- Máel Dúin mac Conaill (died c.668), king in Dál Riata
- Máel Dúin mac Máele Fithrich (died 681), king of Ailech
- Máel Dúin mac Fergusa (died 785), king of Lagore
- Máel Dúin mac Áedo Alláin (died 788), king of Ailech
- Máel Dúin mac Áedo (died 796), perhaps king of Munster
- Máel Dúin (bishop of the Scots) (died 1055), bishop of Cennrígmonaid, modern St Andrews, Scotland
