= Glasgow (surname) =

Glasgow or Glasgo is a surname of Scottish origin, often derived from the city of Glasgow. Notable people with the name include:

== Ecclesiastical and Civic Figures (13th–15th Century) ==
- John de Glasgu (fl. 1259), chaplain to Bishop Gamelin and possibly the earliest known bearer of the surname
- John of Glasgow (fl. 1287–1289), monk of Holyrood Abbey
- Andrew de Glasgow (fl. 1289), burgh official overseeing escheats for the Exchequer
- John de Glasgu (fl. 1343), royal servant compensated for services to the king's table
- Master John de Glasgow (c. 1340–before 1419), Vicar of St. Mary's and Canon of Moray

== Reformation and Post-Reformation Clergy (16th–17th Century) ==
- John Glasgow M.A. (fl. 1568), Minister of Kilbirnie (1614–1629)
- John Glasgow (1653–1721), Minister of Kilbirnie in the Presbytery of Irvine
- John Glasgow (1690–1764), Esq. of Craig, a prominent Scottish merchant and civic leader who served three terms as Provost of Irvine, Ayrshire
- Robert Glasgow, M.D. (b. 1693), Scottish surgeon at Kilbirnie and chamberlain (factor) to the Viscount of Garnock; resident at Puddockholm and estate manager for Kilbirnie and Glengarnock

== 18th and 19th Century Gentry and Legal Figures ==
- Sir Robert Glasgow of Mountgreenan (1747–1827), Scottish landowner and West Indies merchant.
- Alexander Glasgow (1792–1873), Scottish merchant and landowner, founder of Alexander Glasgow & Co., purchaser of estates in County Cork and Waterford including Oldcourt and Kilmanahan Castle

== Military and Public Service ==
- Michaela Frey (née Glasgo; born 1992/1993), Canadian politician
- Bob Glasgow (1942–2023), American Democratic Party politician
- Carl Glasgow (1883–1954), Australian politician
- Harold G. Glasgow (1929–2020), United States Marine Corps Major General
- Hugh Glasgow (1769–1818), American politician
- James Glasgow (c. 1735–1819), American politician, first Secretary of State of North Carolina
- William Glasgow (general) (1876–1955), Australian military officer and diplomat
- William Glass (born William Glasgow; 1786–1853), Scottish soldier and founder of the settlement on Tristan da Cunha

== Law and Academia ==
- Maude Glasgow (1876–1955), Irish-born American physician and public health pioneer
- Oliver Glasgow, British barrister
- Don Glasgo, American professor of music, affiliated with the Giant Country Horns

== Arts and Literature ==
- Don Glasgo, American professor of music, affiliated with the Giant Country Horns
- Alex Glasgow (1935–2001), British singer-songwriter and scriptwriter
- Ellen Glasgow (1873–1945), American novelist, winner of the 1942 Pulitzer Prize
- Deborahe Glasgow (1966-1994), English lovers rock singer
- Kathleen Glasgow (born 1969), American author of young adult fiction
- Robert Glasgow (1925–2008), American organist and music educator
- Scott Glasgow (born c. 1976), 21st-century American composer
- William Glasgow (art director) (1906–1972), American art director

== Sports ==
- Byron Glasgow (born 1979), English footballer
- Cameron Glasgow (born 1966), Scottish rugby union player
- Chad Glasgow (born 1972), American football coach
- Gary Glasgow (born 1976), Trinidadian soccer player
- George Glasgow (1931–2013), American basketball player and soccer coach
- Graham Glasgow (born 1992), American football player
- Harry Glasgow (1929–2016), Scottish football player and manager
- Jordan Glasgow (born 1996), American football player
- Nesby Glasgow (1957–2020), American football player
- Ron Glasgow (1930–2024), Scottish rugby union player
- Ryan Glasgow (born 1993), American football player
- Walter Glasgow (born 1957), American Olympic sailor
- Wayne Glasgow (1926–2000), American basketball player
