= Inchcolm Abbey =

Abbey in Scotland

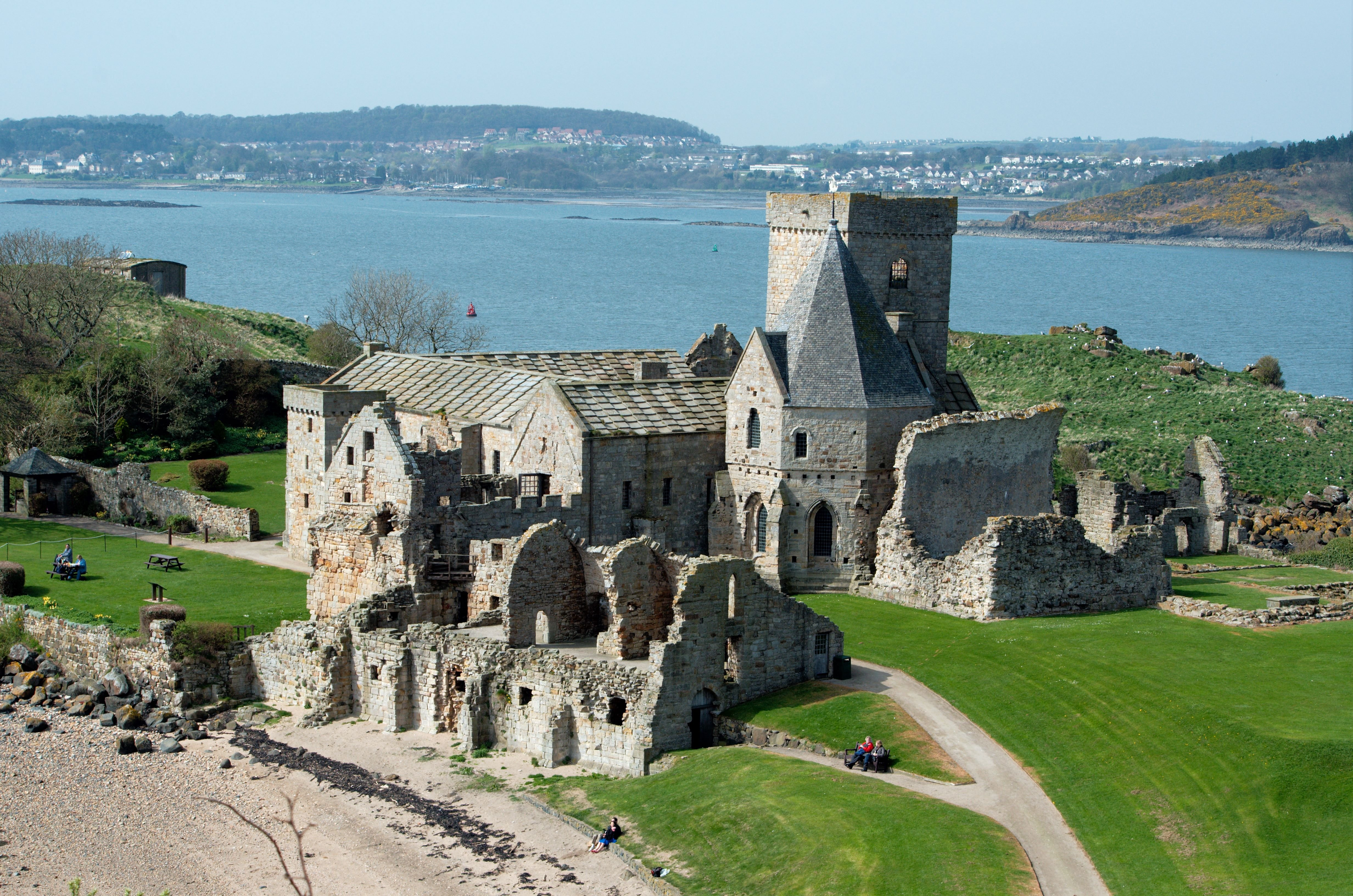
- Photograph, 9 April 2011
- Interactive map of Inchcolm Abbey

Monastery information
- Order: Augustinian
- Established: 1147 x 1169 (priory)/ 1235 (abbey)
- Disestablished: 1609
- Diocese: Diocese of Dunkeld
- Controlled churches: Aberdour; Auchtertool; Beath; Dalgety; Dollar; Leslie; Rosyth

People
- Founders: David I of Scotland & Gregoir, Bishop of Dunkeld
- Important associated figures: Walter Bower

Site
- Coordinates: 56.02992°N 3.30177°W

Scheduled monument
- Official name: Malcolm Canmore's Tower
- Designated: 6 April 1921
- Reference no.: SM90166

Inchcolm Abbey is a medieval abbey located on the island of Inchcolm in the Firth of Forth in Scotland. The Abbey, which is located at the centre of the island, was founded in the 12th century during the episcopate of Gregoir, Bishop of Dunkeld. Later tradition placed it even earlier, in the reign of King Alexander I of Scotland (1107–24), who had taken shelter on Inchcolm when his ship was forced ashore during a storm in 1123. It is said he resided there for three days with the Hermit of Inchcolm.

The Abbey was first used as a priory by Augustinian canons regular, becoming a full abbey in 1235. The island was attacked by the English from 1296 onwards, and the Abbey was abandoned as a result of the Scottish Reformation in 1560. It has since been used for defensive purposes, as it is situated in a strategically important position in the middle of the Firth of Forth. A Latin inscription carved above the Abbey's entrance reads:

Stet domus haec donec fluctus formica marinos ebibat, et totum testudo perambulet orbem

Translated, it has been rendered thus:

"Still may these turrets lift their heads on high,

Nor e’er as crumbling ruins strew the ground,

Until an ant shall drink the ocean dry,

And a slow tortoise travel the world round."

Inchcolm Abbey has the most complete surviving remains of any Scottish monastic house. The cloisters, chapter house, warming house, and refectory are all complete, and most of the remaining claustral buildings survive in a largely complete state. The least well-preserved part of the complex is the monastic church. The ruins are cared for by Historic Environment Scotland, which also maintains a visitor centre near the landing pier (entrance charge; ferry from South Queensferry).

In July 1581 stones from the abbey were taken to Edinburgh to repair the Tolbooth.

Among the Abbots of Inchcolm was the 15th-century chronicler Walter Bower.

== Inchcolm Antiphoner ==
The Abbey gives its name to the 14th-century manuscript referred to as the Inchcolm Antiphoner. It contains one of the few remaining examples of Celtic Plainchant. Pages of the Antiphoner can be accessed online in facsimile from the University of Edinburgh.

The Antiphoner contains a substantial number of chants dedicated to Saint Columba. While these may derive from a variety of other monastic foundations with Columban associations, such as Oronsay Priory or Iona, Inchcolm is considered the most likely source of the manuscript's compilation, if not composition.

Fraser Fifield's arrangement of the Inchcolm Antiphoner for saxophone quartet was released as an album in June 2026.

== Fictional Settings ==
- William Shakespeare referenced Inchcolm Abbey in his play Macbeth, 1606.
- William Clinkenbeard wrote the novel The Battle of Inchcolm Abbey, 2012.

== See also ==
- Abbot of Inchcolm, for a list of priors and abbots of the community
- Walter Bower, the most famous abbot
- Abbeys and priories in Scotland, for a general list of Scottish monasteries
- Scheduled monuments in Fife
