= Geoffrey de Liberatione =

Galfredus, Galfred or Geoffrey de Liberatione was Bishop of Dunkeld and Bishop-postulate of St Andrews. He was a clerk to King Alexander II of Scotland as early as 1219, as well as being a canon of Dunkeld and precentor of Glasgow. He was elected to the bishopric of Dunkeld in 1236. After an investigation by Pope Gregory IX regarding a defect of birth possessed by Galfred, he was confirmed as bishop in sometime in 1237.

In 1238, after the death of William de Malveisin, bishop of St Andrews, Geoffrey was postulated to that see. However, this postulation was disallowed by the Pope, and Geoffrey remained bishop of Dunkeld. Geoffrey was one of the bishops present at the coronation of King Alexander III in 1249. He died at Tibbermore (then Tippermuir) on St Cecilia's Day (22 November) 1249. He was buried in the cathedral of Dunkeld.

Religious titles
| Preceded by Gilbert the Chaplain | Bishop of Dunkeld; 1236/7–1249 | Succeeded by Richard de Inverkeithing |
| Preceded by William de Malveisin | Bishop of St Andrews post. 1238 (overturned by Pope) | Succeeded by David de Bernham |
