= Máel Ísu II (bishop of the Scots) =

Roman Catholic bishop

Máel Ísu II is the sixth alleged Bishop of the Scots, equivalent to latter day St. Andrews. He is mentioned in the bishop-lists of the 15th-century historians Walter Bower and Andrew of Wyntoun as the successor of Cellach II. We have no direct dates for Máel Ísu II's episcopate, but the indirect evidence for his predecessors suggests that he was bishop in the late 10th and/or early 11th century.

== Notes ==
Religious titles
| Preceded by Máel Muire | Bishop of the Scots fl. late 10th century/early 11th century | Succeeded by Ailín |
