= Ailín (bishop) =

Ailín (also spelled Algune or Alwin) is the seventh alleged Bishop of St Andrews. He is mentioned in the bishop-lists of the 15th-century historians Walter Bower and Andrew of Wyntoun as the successor of Máel Ísu II. We have no direct dates for Ailín's episcopate, but the indirect evidence for his predecessors suggests that he was bishop in the early 11th century. Name occurs in Latin form as Alwinus, the form for the Anglo-Saxon name Ælfwine, although it may be a form for Alpín. A similar name, Alguine, occurs in the Book of Deer, and two Mormaers of Lennox had the name Ailín, similarly rendered as Alwinus.

== Notes ==
Religious titles
Preceded by Máel Ísu II	Bishop of the Scots fl. early 11th century	Succeeded by Máel Dúin
