= Túathal (bishop of the Scots) =

Túathal is the ninth Bishop of St Andrews. He is mentioned in the bishop-list of the later medieval historian Walter Bower as the successor of Bishop Máel Dúin. Túathal's name, like his immediate predecessor Máel Dúin's, is known from other sources. A charter preserved in the Registrum of the Priory of St. Andrews, although probably translated into Latin from Gaelic at a later date, records a grant of the lands and church of Scoonie by Bishop Túathal (Tuadal) of St. Andrews to the Céli Dé of Loch Leven. Bower says that Túathal ruled as bishop for four years; as his successor Máel Dúin is known to have died in 1055, this would put his episcopate at roughly between the years 1055/6 and 1059/60. Túathal's immediate successor was the famous Bishop Fothad II.

== Notes ==
Religious titles
Preceded by Máel Dúin	Bishop of the Scots; 1055/6-1059/60	Succeeded by Fothad II
