= John Trevor (died 1410) =

Welsh bishop

John Trevor (Welsh: Ieuan Trefor; died 10 April 1410), or John Trevaur, was Bishop of St. Asaph in Wales before becoming nominal Bishop of St Andrews in Scotland. His original name was Ieuan, which he later anglicised to John and took on the surname Trevor. Trevor's brother Adda was married to the sister of Owain Glyndŵr, who appointed him as an ambassador to the French court.

Ieuan was provided to the see of St Asaph on 21 October 1394. He served as Richard II's diplomatic envoy to Scotland in 1395. In 1404 he supported the cause of Owain Glyndŵr and when the rising failed he was banished to Scotland. He was translated to St Andrews in 1408. As Bishop of St. Andrews, he was an anti-Bishop and never took possession of the see. This situation was the product of the Western Schism, in which the Scots supported the Avignon Popes, and so only candidates of the Avignon Popes could take possession of the see.

He died in Rome.

Religious titles
Preceded by Alexander Bache	Bishop of St. Asaph; 1394–1408	Succeeded by David
Preceded by Thomas de Arundel	Anti-Bishop of St. Andrews; 1408–1410	Succeeded by -
