= Maëlys =

Female given name

- Pronunciation: French pronunciation: [ma.ɛˈlis]
- Gender: female

Origin
- Origin: Breton
- Meaning: "chief, prince"
- Region of origin: France

Other names
- Related names: Maël, Maëlle, Maïlys

Maëlys is a French feminine name of Breton origin. It is a feminine form of the name Maël, meaning "chief" or "prince". The name Maël was popularized by a fifth-century Breton saint Maël. During the early 2000s, the name Maëlys ranked highly for names given to baby girls, but subsequently declined in popularity. Maëlle, another feminine form of the name Maël, is also popular in France and has ranked highly as a girl's name. The Basque name, Maïlys, is also reputedly connected.

== Women ==
- Murder of Maëlys de Araujo (2008-2017), French child murder victim
- Maëlys Laporte (born 2006), French rhythmic gymnast
- Maelys Mpomé (born 2003), French professional footballer
