= Stephen de Pa =

Scottish Roman Catholic bishop (d. 1386)

Stephen de Pa († 2 March 1386) was Prior and, briefly, Bishop-elect of St. Andrews. He was elected to succeed William de Landallis as Bishop after the latter's death on 23 September 1385. He was never consecrated, because while on his way to continental Europe to receive confirmation and consecration by the Pope, carrying a commendation from King Robert II of Scotland and a decree of the election, he was captured by English pirates. He was kept prisoner in England while his captors demanded a ransom. Stephen however did not want his church burdened with such a payment and chose to remain in that country. Moreover, he fell ill soon after his capture and subsequently died at Alnwick on 2 March 1386.

Religious titles
Preceded by William de Landallis	Bishop of St Andrews (Cill Rìmhinn); 1385–86 elect only	Succeeded by Walter Trail
