= Robert de Stuteville =

13th-century Scottish Roman Catholic bishop

Robert de Stuteville (died 1283) was Bishop-elect of St Andrews and Bishop of Dunkeld. Robert was dean of Dunkeld as early as 1253, when he was elected to the bishopric of St Andrews on 28 June that year. His election was opposed by the king, Alexander III, and by the bishopric's Céli Dé chapter. The prior and the canons sent Robert to Rome, but a delegation of the king, including Abel de Golynn, was also sent, and the result was that Robert's election was quashed.

Robert remained dean in Dunkeld. In 1273, after the death of Bishop Richard de Inverkeithing, Robert was elected to succeed him. In the following year, the Pope commanded the Bishop of Moray, the Bishop of Aberdeen and the Bishop of Glasgow to investigate his election. The investigation was successful and led to his consecration. Robert probably died in 1283.

Catholic Church titles
| Preceded by David de Bernham | Bishop of St Andrews elected 1253 (overturned by Pope) | Succeeded by Abel de Golynn |
| Preceded by Richard de Inverkeithing | Bishop of Dunkeld; 1273–1283 | Succeeded by Hugo de Strivelin (elect only); William the Dean |
