= William de Landallis =

- Bishop of St Andrews
- Church: Roman Catholic Church
- Diocese: St Andrews
- Appointed: 18 February 1342
- Term ended: 23 September 1385
- Predecessor: William Bell
- Successor: Stephen de Pa

Orders
- Consecration: 17 March 1342 by Pierre Desprès

Personal details
- Died: 23 September 1385 St Andrews, Scotland

William de Landallis (died 1385) was a 14th-century Bishop of St. Andrews.

== Life ==
Like his predecessor, James Bane, he was a native of Aberdeenshire, serving as rector of Kinkell before being appointed by Pope Benedict XII as the successor to James at St. Andrews. The prior and the chapter of the see had actually chosen William Bell, dean of diocese of Dunkeld, "a famous gret persoune" [Andrew of Wyntoun's Chronicle], but "depressed by age and afflicted by blindness" [John Dowden, "Some Bishops of St Andrews in Scotland"], and having waited in vain for the Pope's confirmation of his election, William Bell had the fair-mindedness to resign all the rights derived from his election to the Pope, who, understanding William's position, respected his decision. The Kings of Scotland and France joined the Pope in their recommendation of William de Landallis, and the candidate put forward by the English King was not accepted. According to Walter Bower (vi. 45), William was appointed to the bishopric on 18 February 1342, a date confirmed by a known papal letter. William Bell travelled back to Scotland with Landallis, and died in the Priory of St Andrews on 7 February 1342 or 1743 [Dowden, ibid.]

William's long rule as bishop was generally successful.

In 1370, he crowned Robert II at Scone. However, it was during William's episcopate that St. Andrews' Cathedral was destroyed by fire. In 1381, Pope Clement VII granted some benefices towards the cathedral's reconstruction, and promised certain rewards to those lay donors who assisted with this aim.

William died at St. Andrews, in the Priory, on 23 September 1385. He was buried inside the cathedral, in the church's vestry.

== Notes ==
Religious titles
Preceded by William Bell	Bishop of St Andrews (Cill Rìmhinn); 1342–1385	Succeeded by Stephen de Pa (unconsecrated); Walter Trail
