= Fothad I =

Scottish bishop (d. 963)

Fothad I (died 963) is the second alleged Bishop of the Scots (906x955). We know he had the status of "bishop" during the reign of King Dub mac Maíl Coluim because the Chronicle of the Kings of Alba has his death in the period of his reign (962–967). Such a date is supported by the Irish annals, and according to the Annals of the Four Masters, he died in 963. According to the latter source, he was Fothadh, mac Brain, scribhnidh & espucc Insi Alban; that is, "Fothad, son of Bran, scribe and bishop of the islands of Scotland". This entry taken on its own obviously places some doubt on his status as a bishop of St Andrews. It is only because he is mentioned as a bishop of St. Andrews in the bishop-lists of Walter Bower and Andrew of Wyntoun that he is identified with this see; however no pre-15th century sources actually confirm this, although it is true that there was definitely a bishop of this name in the 11th century. Bower, however, gives some explanation, telling us that Fothad "was driven out by King Indolff; and after his expulsion from the see he lived for 8 years". This Indolff, or King Idulb mac Causantín reigned between 954 and 962. If we take both Bower's statement and the obit reported in the Annals of the Four Masters to be correct, this means that Fothad was expelled in 955. Although it is unlikely anyway, he could not have been bishop before the year 906, when we know his predecessor Cellach was still bishop. That he died in 963 as "espucc Insi Alban" allows the possibility that he transferred his see to Iona or elsewhere on the western coast of Scotland after 955, although this is just conjecture.

== Notes ==
Religious titles
Preceded by Cellach	Bishop of the Scots? fl. after 906x955	Succeeded by Máel Ísu
Preceded by ?	Bishop of Innse Alban ? fl. 955x963	Succeeded by Finguine ?
