= Abel de Gullane =

- Bishop of St Andrews
- Church: Roman Catholic Church
- Diocese: St Andrews
- Appointed: 20 February 1254
- Term ended: 1 December 1254
- Predecessor: Robert de Stuteville
- Successor: Gamelin

Orders
- Consecration: 1 March 1254 by Pope Innocent IV

Personal details
- Died: 1 December 1254

Abel de Gullane [Golynn, Golin] was a 13th-century Bishop of St Andrews. He had been archdeacon of the diocese, and subsequently a Papal chaplain. In early 1254, after quashing the election of Robert de Stuteville, the Pope provided Abel to the bishopric, a decision not universally popular in Scotland. His first appearance back at St Andrews as bishop was on 29 June 1254, when he is recorded as celebrating the Papal mass. He died only a few months later, on 1 December.

Religious titles
Preceded by Robert de Stuteville (unconsecrated); David de Bernham (consecrated)	Bishop of St. Andrews (Cell Rígmonaid); 1254	Succeeded by Gamelin
