= David de Bernham =

- Bishop of St Andrews
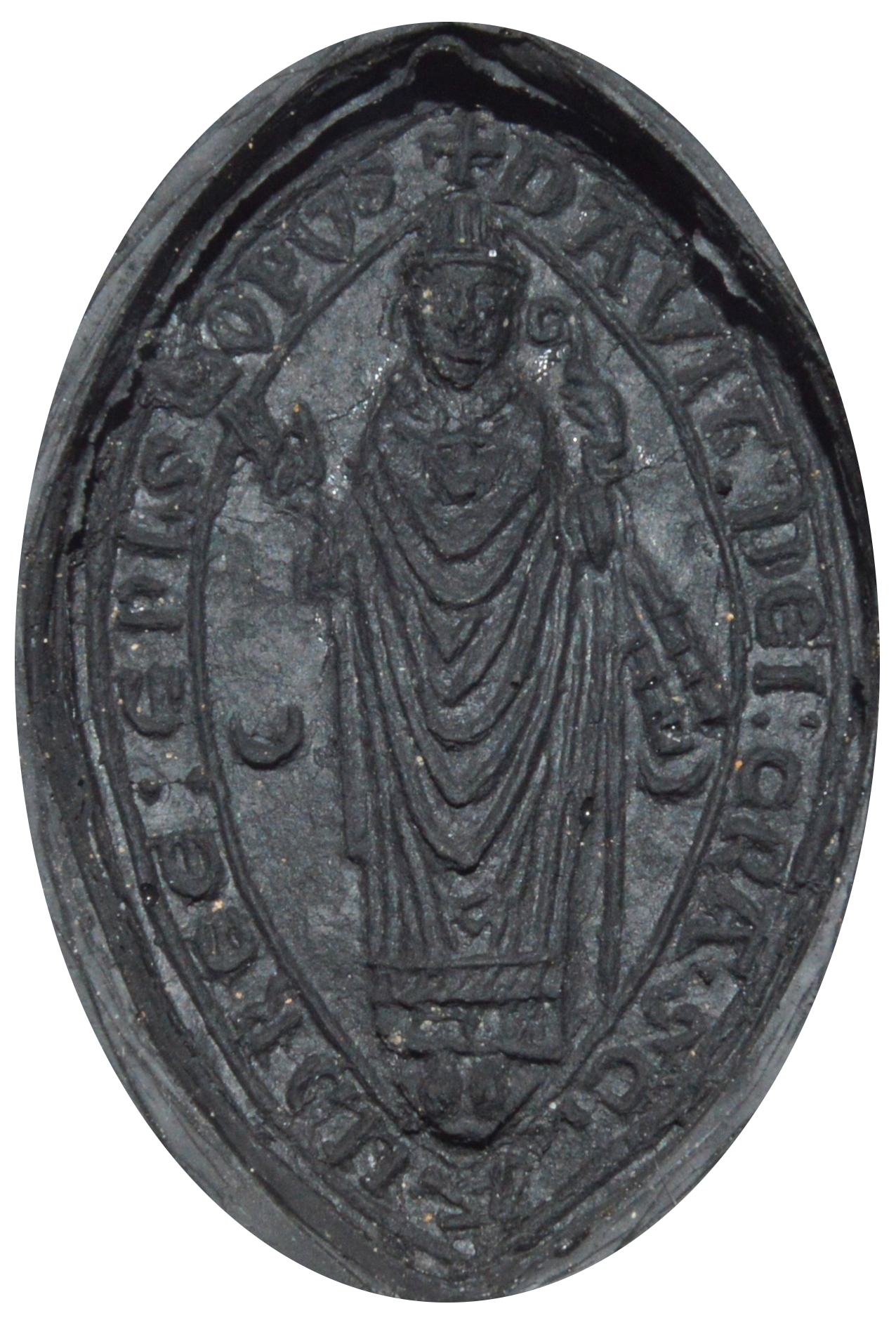
- seal of David de Bernham
- Church: Roman Catholic Church
- See: Diocese of St Andrews
- In office: 1240–1253
- Predecessor: William de Malveisin
- Successor: Abel de Golynn

Orders
- Consecration: 1240

Personal details
- Died: disputed

David de Bernham (died 1253) was Chamberlain of King Alexander II of Scotland and subsequently, Bishop of St Andrews. He was elected to the see in June 1239, and finally consecrated, after some difficulties, in January 1240. He died at Nenthorn in 1253 and was buried at Kelso. One interesting feature of his life which has left a written record is the fact that as bishop of St Andrews he consecrated a long list of churches in his diocese. These churches are listed by name, together with the dates on which they were consecrated, in the 1240s, in a 13th-century Pontifical now in the Bibliothèque National, Paris (B.N. Latin 1218).

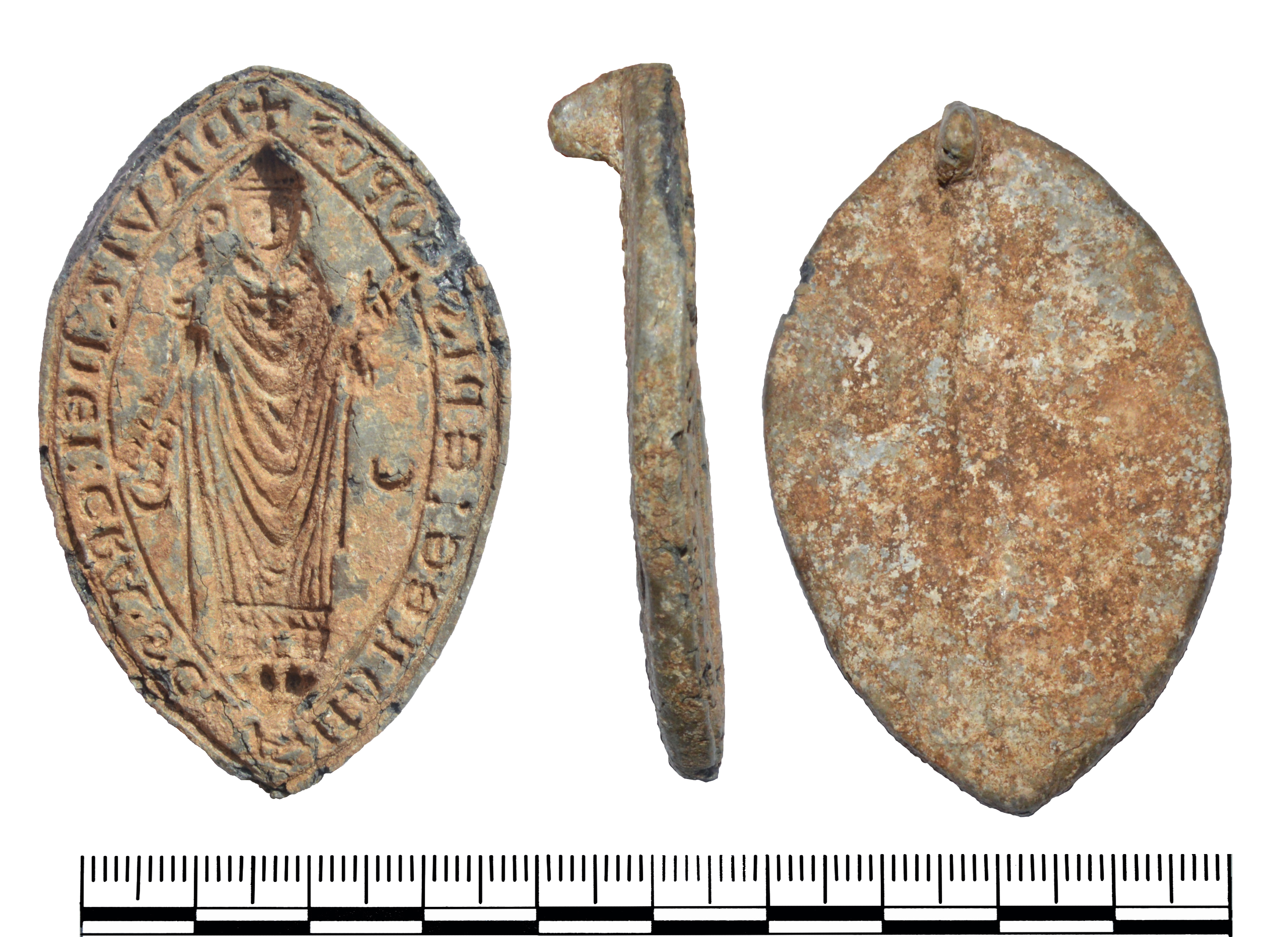
Lead-alloy matrix seal whose latin inscription reads “David, God’s messenger, bishop of St Andrews”. The base metal may suggest a forgery.

== Election and consecration ==
On 3 June 1239 David de Bernham was elected Bishop of St Andrews, and on 22 January following was consecrated by the Bishops of Glasgow, Caithness, and Brechin. He at once set about a visitation of his large Diocese, that extended along the East Coast from the Tweed to the Dee; and the Paris Manuscript is the Service Book used for Dedications, while it also contains the roll of his Church Dedications, which were carried on till near the time when his Episcopate closed in 1253.

== Details of his dedications ==
In his first year, De Bernham was in the southern part of his See, and dedicated Churches at Lasswade on 7 May, Perth (a predecessor of today's St John's Kirk) about a week after, and North Berwick on 8 July. In 1241, also, he was for the most part in the South, in the Counties of Berwick and Haddington, but he first dedicated St Ninian's, near Stirling, on 16 August, and after three months came northwards again, and has Consecrations at Forteviot in Perthshire, and Kinnettles in Forfarshire, the latter on 11 November. The following year is one of great Episcopal activity, and the only time open for attendance at a Provincial Council held in Perth was from near the middle of June to the middle of July. But in the Spring of this year he held a Synod at Musselburgh, where some Canons were enacted. Early in the Spring (14 March) he is at Mid-Calder, to the west of the Pentlands, and two days after dedicates St Cuthbert's, under the shadow of the Castle, in Edinburgh.

Religious titles
Preceded by William de Malveisin; Galfred de Liberatione (failed postulation)	Bishop of St Andrews (Cell Rígmonaid); 1239/40–1253	Succeeded by Robert de Stuteville (unconsecrated); Abel de Golynn (consecrated)
