= Saint Cellach of Glendalough =

Irish saint (early Middle Ages)

Saint Ceallach of Glendalough
- Born: unknown
- Residence: County Wicklow
- Died: Disert Cellaig, south east of Glendalough
- Venerated in: Catholic Church
- Feast: 7 October

Saint Cellach or Ceallach was an early medieval saint associated with Glendalough in County Wicklow, Ireland.

Martyrology of Tallaght refers to him as a Saxon. He was a deacon, and lived to the southeast of Glendalough at a place called Disert-Cellaig which denotes a hermitage and implies that Cellach may have lived as a recluse. In the Irish life of Saint Kevin he is mentioned as having been ordered to go to Disert Cellaig as a penance 'for his vanity.' His feast day is 7 October.
