= Máel Ísu I (bishop of the Scots) =

Alleged Scottish Bishop

Máel Ísu I is the third alleged Bishop of Cennrígmonaid (fl. mid-10th century), equivalent to latter day St Andrews. He is mentioned in the bishop-lists of the 15th-century historians Walter Bower (Malisius) and Andrew of Wyntoun (Malice) as the successor of Fothad I, and it is claimed that he reigned as bishop for eight years. If Máel Ísu's predecessor did get expelled from the bishopric in 955, (and Máel Ísu succeeded immediately), and if Máel Ísu's reign really was eight years, then Máel Ísu would have held the bishopric between the years 955 and 963.

Our only sources for Máel Ísu list his name in the forms Malisius and Malice, forms clearly identifiable with the common medieval Scottish name Máel Ísu ("tonsured one of Jesus"), and thus he cannot be identified with the "Bishop Máel Brigte" mentioned in the early 11th-century source known as the Chronicle of the Kings of Alba, whose death can be placed sometime between 966 and 971.

According to the lists, Máel Ísu was succeeded by Bishop Cellach II.

== See also ==
- Máel Brigte

== Notes ==
Religious titles
Preceded by Fothad	Bishop of the Scots; 955/6-963/4	Succeeded by Cellach II
