= Walter Trail =

- Bishop of St Andrews
- Church: Roman Catholic Church
- Diocese: St Andrews
- Appointed: 29 November 1385
- Term ended: 1401
- Predecessor: Stephen de Pa
- Successor: Thomas Stewart

Personal details
- Died: 1401 St Andrews, Scotland

Walter Trail (died 1401; also spelled Trayl) was a late 14th-century bishop of St. Andrews.

He appears as an official in the Bishopric of Glasgow in 1378, as a Magister Artium and a licentiate in canon and civil law. In 1380, he had a doctorate in canon and civil law, as well as being a Papal chaplain and auditor. In this year, Pope Clement VII (an "anti-Pope") granted him the deanery of the Bishopric of Dunkeld. He became treasurer of the Bishopric of Glasgow in either 1381 or 1382. On 29 November 1385, the Pope provided him to the vacant Bishopric of St. Andrews, vacant because of the capture and death of the previous bishop-elect, Stephen de Pa.

Trail was an active bishop, and ardent defender of the rights of the church within Scotland. He constructed the castle at St. Andrews. It was there that he died in 1401.

Religious titles
Preceded by Stephen de Pa (unconsecrated); William de Landallis	Bishop of St Andrews (Cill Rìmhinn); 1385–1401	Succeeded by Thomas Stewart, Walter de Danyelston and Gilbert Greenlaw (all unconsecrated); Henry Wardlaw
