= William de Lamberton =

Scottish bishop

William Lamberton
- Bishop of St Andrews
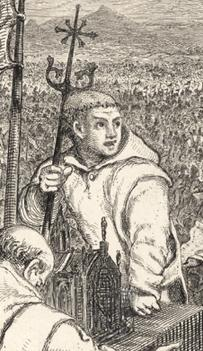
- Church: Roman Catholic Church
- Diocese: St Andrews
- In office: 1297–1328
- Predecessor: William Fraser
- Successor: James Bane
- Previous post: Chancellor of Glasgow Cathedral

Orders
- Consecration: 1 June 1298 by Matteo d'Acquasparta

Personal details
- Born: unknown Possibly Ayrshire or Lamberton, near Berwick
- Died: 20 May 1328

Guardian of the Kingdom of Scotland (Second Interregnum)
- In office 1299–1301 Serving with: Robert the Bruce (1298–1300); John III Comyn (1298–1301); Ingram de Umfraville (1300–1301)
- Preceded by: William Wallace^{[a]}
- Succeeded by: John de Soules
- a. Wallace had resigned in 1298 and been succeeded in the same year by Bruce and Comyn. Lamberton was appointed as a 'neutral' third successor in 1299.

William de Lamberton, sometimes modernized as William Lamberton, (died 20 May 1328) was Bishop of St Andrews from 1297 (consecrated 1298) until his death. Lamberton is renowned for his influential role during the Scottish Wars of Independence. He campaigned for the national cause under William Wallace and later Robert the Bruce. As Bishop of St Andrews, the most powerful seat in Scotland, Bishop Lamberton along with Bishop Robert Wishart of Glasgow conducted the coronation of Robert the Bruce as King Robert I. Lamberton would go on to have a vital role in the formulation of the Declaration of the Clergy 1310 and the Declaration of Arbroath which would lead to Scottish Independence.

During his tenure Lamberton was excommunicated by Rome for his role in the Wars of Independence along with Robert I and the Clergy of Scotland. However, he was reconciled with the Papacy before his death.

== Birth and early life ==
Details from the National Dictionary of Biography do seem to clarify his origins in the Lamberton family, originally from Berwickshire, but holding lands in north-east Scotland by the late twelfth century and later in Stirlingshire also. Details of his birth, education, and early career are not certain; he had certainly received a university education by early 1293 and become a canon of Glasgow. By the time of his appearance at King John's (Baliol) first parliament in February 1293 he was chancellor of Glasgow Cathedral. He seems to have been sent abroad for further study by Bishop Robert Wishart of Glasgow, probably in the year or two before July 1295.

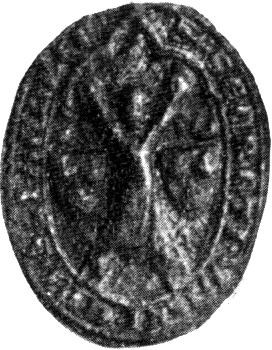
The seal of Bishop William de Lamberton.

The Lamberton surname is recorded in one source as having a close association with the ancient Barony of Kilmaurs, Ayrshire and the Lands of Lambroughton.

William Lamberton however most probably originated from the settlement of Lamberton, near Berwick in the Scottish Borders where the family held large estates (Logan Mack 1926). The name Lamberton here was derived from the Germanic name Lambert, whilst Lambroughton, sometimes spelt Lamberton, is derived from a corruption of the clan McLamroch.

== Bishop of Saint Andrews ==
He was appointed Bishop of St Andrews in 1298 by Pope Boniface VIII in succession to William Fraser. Lamberton appears to have been a very odd choice for a Bishop as he was very young at the time. However, according to Scottish historian Geoffrey Barrow Lamberton landed the position of Bishop due to then Guardian William Wallace who saw Lamberton as a potential ally and supporter of Independence, likely due to Lamberton's close ties with Bishop Wishart, who was a staunch supporter of Independence. St Andrews was then the wealthiest and most powerful See in Scotland catapulting Lamberton straight into the highest circles in Scotland.

The English would later charge Wallace with forcing the Chapter of Saint Andrews into electing Lamberton although evidence suggests that Lamberton was a popular candidate amongst the Chapter attracting the support of Nicholas Balmyle and William Comyn. He was consecrated in Rome on 1 June 1298, before joining other Scots on a diplomatic mission to France.

Bishop Lamberton took a young James Douglas as his squire, Douglas' father William the Hardy, Lord of Douglas had joined the Scots during the First War of Independence and died while imprisoned by King Edward I. Lamberton protected Douglas and took him to court to petition unsuccessfully for the return of his estates. James Douglas later became one of the closest friends of Robert the Bruce.

William Lamberton rebuilt St. Andrew's Cathedral, the castle of St Andrew's, and the fortified manor houses at Inchmurdo, Monimail, Dairsie, Torry, Muckhart, Kettins, Monymusk, Lasswade, and Stow.

== Role in War of Independence ==
Upon becoming bishop, Lamberton found himself in control of the diocese's vast funds; he used them to fund the war against England. He would also act as an important diplomat and envoy for Scotland. Lamberton remained a supporter of Scotland's independence and was even excommunicated for his role.

=== Diplomacy ===
When being consecrated as bishop, Lamberton went to France to build support for Scotland in the French Court and Papal Curia. As early as June 1298 Lamberton had won victories for the Scottish cause; his activities led both the King of France Philip IV and Pope Boniface VIII to pressure Edward I to halt his attacks on Scotland. It led to Scotland's deposed king John Balliol being handed over into papal custody in 1299.

In a letter to Scottish leaders dated 6 April 1299 Philip IV commended Lamberton's efforts and declared he would assist Scotland. Despite the Bishop's pleas, he did not send a military force to Scotland. Lamberton returned to France in 1301, and then in 1302, to keep pressing for France's support in the war. Lamberton clearly formed a bond with Philip - the French king intervened several times for Scotland.

Bishop Lamberton's diplomatic abilities were later recognised by the Scottish Magnates when he was chosen as a third Guardian, alongside Robert Bruce and John Comyn in 1299. His role was to act as a third, senior, but neutral party between the two enemies. He would hold the position until 1301 and during his term he formed a close friendship with Bruce.

=== Wallace's man ===
Lamberton owed his position largely to the efforts of William Wallace who had been made sole Guardian of Scotland after the Battle of Stirling Bridge in 1297 and as such Lamberton supported Wallace. Lamberton's clergy publicly denounced the English and supported Wallace. Lamberton ordered his Diocese's officials to divert Church funds to Wallace's campaign and urged Wallace to continue to fight England. After the defeat at Falkirk Wallace resigned the guardianship. Lamberton continued to support Scottish Independence.

=== Ties with Robert the Bruce ===
After forming close ties with Bruce during his time as Guardian, Lamberton saw him as a potential leader of a fight for independence. On 11 June 1304 Lamberton and Bruce formed a band "to resist prudently attacks by rivals...to be of one another's council in all their business and affairs at all times...without any deceit" This bond marked Bishop William's switch from supporting Balliol to Bruce.

Both Lamberton and Bishop Wishart of Glasgow are said to have assured Bruce that should he make a move for Kingship they would not try to stop him. Bruce and his companions killed the Red Comyn and his uncle in the Greyfriars Church on 10 February 1306. Less than seven weeks later, Bruce was crowned King of Scots in Scone Abbey on 25 March 1306. Lamberton and Wishart jointly conducted the coronation. Bruce was crowned again a few days later by Isabella MacDuff. Lamberton and Wishart were arrested and put in irons for their roles in Bruce's coronation and transported to London where they were imprisoned. "Only their Orders saved them from hanging." Lamberton was later charged with treason against Edward.

After Edward I's death on 7 July 1307, Lamberton swore fealty to his son Edward II. The bishop was released in August 1308 on onerous terms and was not free to return to Scotland. He promised to pursue the English King's enemies, pay a ransom of £6000 in installments and remain within the boundaries of the See of Durham. Lamberton saw his oath to Edward II as a necessity and extorted from him under duress, and therefore it was invalid. During his time in England, Lamberton remained near the Tweed so that he could maintain connections with the parts of his diocese under English rule. Lamberton also wrote a letter to Philip of France asking for the King to help him gain freedom from England. Lamberton attended negotiations in 1309 as an "English" envoy, and his skill as a diplomat helped him to keep on good terms with both Edward and Robert. Lamberton would never again collaborate with the English and Edward even attempted to have him ousted from the See of St Andrews in 1318 by writing letters to the Pope charging Lamberton with treason. However, Edward's efforts failed.

Lamberton along with Thomas Randolph, 1st Earl of Moray served as the Scottish negotiators in 1323 when a thirteen-year truce was agreed to between Scotland and England.

=== Excommunication and Reconciliation ===
Lamberton and three other bishops were summoned to Avignon to explain their actions but chose to defy the summonses. Lamberton was excommunicated on 16 June 1320. King Robert and the Community of the Realm sent three separate replies to Pope John XXII; the last group's letter, now known as the Declaration of Arbroath, is the most famous. However, although the Declaration of Arbroath received some positive response, because of English pressure, the pope continued the excommunications and interdict although thanks to a personal plea at Avignon by Thomas Randolph, 1st Earl of Moray in 1325, the pope did at least acknowledge Robert the Bruce as King of Scots.

== Death ==
Bishop William de Lamberton died on 20 May 1328, 18 days after England officially recognized that Scotland was a fully sovereign, independent state. He was buried on the north side of the high altar of St Andrews Cathedral on 7 June 1328.

== See also ==
- Lambroughton A History of the Lands of Lambroughton

== Sources ==
- McNaught, Duncan (1912). Kilmaurs Parish and Burgh. Pub. A.Gardner.
- Barrow, Geoffrey Robert Bruce and the Community of The Realm Of Scotland.
- St. Andrews - Bishop William Lamberton
- Ancestry - Lamberton
- James Lord of Douglas

Religious titles
Preceded by William Fraser	Bishop of St. Andrews; 1297/8-1328	Succeeded by James Bane
