= Maude Glasgow =

Irish-born American pioneer of public health and preventive medicine

- Born: 1876; Ireland
- Died: 1955 (aged 78–79); New York

Dr. Maude Glasgow (1876–1955) was an early pioneer in public health and preventive medicine as well as an activist for equal rights.

== Life ==
Maude Glasgow was born in Cookstown, Ireland in 1876. Her father was Silas Glasgow of Killycurragh. She had a brother James later of Moneymore. She was educated in the Marlborough Street College in Dublin before she emigrated to New York. Her sister Janet is remembered for having supported Glasgow during her time in education. Once she was settled in New York she attended the Mount Sinai Training School for Nurses where she got a degree in nursing. But she wanted to learn more so she continued her studies and received a degree in medicine in 1901 from Cornell University Medical College.

Glasgow got a job with Department of Health in New York. She was appointed as medical inspector. She also spent time as the New York Telephone Company's chief woman physician looking after the health of the employees and responsible for public health education. In 1921 she went on to get a further degree in public health from New York University and Bellevue Medical College. She was particularly interested in the welfare of women. Glasgow donated to funds to encourage young women to study medicine and created an award, the Janet M. Glasgow Memorial Award, named after her sister, to the woman who graduates first in her class. It is moderated by the American Medical Women’s Association. There are also citations for the women who graduate in the top 10% of their class. She regularly wrote on the difficulties facing women, on suffrage and the importance of women's ability to take part in society without the obstacles which were artificially put in their way.

Glasgow was a member of both the International Mark Twain and Eugene Field Societies as well as the Medical Women's National Association. She published a number of books about medicine and women's health as well as the emigration of the Scots-Irish to the US. She was also remembered in her obituary as a suffragist and activist in equal rights for women and people of all races. She died in 1955.

== Bibliography ==
- Life and Law: The Development and Exercise of the Sex Function, Together With a Study of the Effect of Certain Natural and Human Laws, and a Consideration of the Hygiene of Sex (1914)
- The Scotch-Irish in Northern Ireland and in the American Colonies (1936)
- The Subjection of Woman and Traditions of Men (1940)
- Problems of Sex (1949)
