= Patrick Graham (bishop) =

Bishop of St. Andrews

- Archbishop of St Andrews
- Church: Roman Catholic Church
- Archdiocese: St Andrews
- Appointed: 15 December 1465
- Term ended: 9 January 1478
- Predecessor: James Kennedy
- Successor: William Scheves
- Previous post: Bishop of Brechin (1463–65)

Personal details
- Died: 1478 Loch Leven, Scotland
- Parents: Sir William Graham of Kincardine and Lady Mary Stewart

Patrick Graham (died 1478) was a 15th-century Bishop of Brechin and Bishop of St. Andrews; he was also the first Archbishop of St. Andrews.

He was the son of Sir William Graham of Kincardine by Lady Mary Stewart, daughter of King Robert III of Scotland. He was therefore of royal blood, and the half-brother of his predecessor as bishop of St. Andrews, James Kennedy. Before rising to the rank of bishop, Patrick for many years controlled the parish church of Kinneil. Although Patrick paid for the bishopric of Brechin, his election was acknowledged by Pope Pius II, who appointed him to the see sometime before 29 March 1463. However, Patrick was not long bishop of Brechin. On 4 November 1465 Patrick was translated to the bishopric of St. Andrews by Pope Paul II, for which Patrick's proctor, a merchant of Florence called Ricardo de Ricasolis, paid over 3300 gold florins on 29 November the same year.

Patrick became the first Archbishop of St. Andrews when a bull of Pope Sixtus IV, dated at Rome, 17 August 1472, elevated the bishopric of St. Andrews to archiepiscopal status. Nevertheless, Patrick's individual career was in trouble. The same Pope Sixtus IV ordered an enquiry into Patrick's conduct. He commissioned one John Huseman, Dean of the church of St. Patroclus in Soest in the diocese of Cologne, to investigate charges (of insanity) made against Archbishop Patrick. The result was that Archbishop Patrick was condemned to confine himself to a monastery, residing first at Inchcolm, then Dunfermline, before being imprisoned in Lochleven Castle. He was formally deposed on 9 January 1478 and died later in the year at Loch Leven. He was buried on St. Serf's Inch in Lochleven.

Religious titles
Preceded by George de Schoriswod	Bishop of Brechin; 1463/1464–1465	Succeeded by John Balfour
Preceded by James Kennedy	Bishop of St Andrews; After 17 August 1472, Archbishop of St Andrews; 1465–1478	Succeeded by William Scheves
Academic offices
Preceded by James Kennedy; Bishop of St Andrews	Chancellor of the University of St Andrews; 1465–1478	Succeeded by William Scheves; Archbishop of St Andrews
