= William Fraser (bishop of St Andrews) =

- Bishop of St Andrews
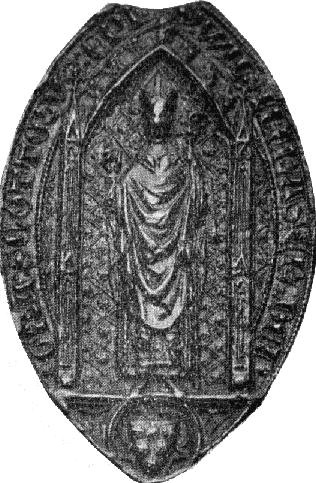
- The seal of Bishop William Fraser. The other side contains his arms, making this the earliest episcopal seal from the British Isles on which the arms are represented.
- Church: Roman Catholic Church
- Diocese: St Andrews
- Appointed: 4 August 1279
- Term ended: 20 August 1297
- Predecessor: William Wishart
- Successor: William de Lamberton
- Previous post: Dean of Glasgow

Orders
- Consecration: 19 May 1280 by Pope Nicholas III

Personal details
- Died: 20 August 1297 France

William Fraser (died 1297) was a late 13th century Bishop of St Andrews and Guardian of the Kingdom of Scotland. Before election to the bishopric, he had been and Royal Chancellor of King Alexander III of Scotland and dean of Glasgow. He was elected to the bishopric on 4 August 1279 and confirmed in the position the following year by Pope Nicholas III.

William was one of the leading political figures in the kingdom during the crisis that emerged in the aftermath of King Alexander. In 1290, he was elected as one of the six Guardians of Scotland, the six oligarchs who ran Scotland until the accession of King John Balliol. When the latter was appointed as King of Scots by King Edward I of England, William retained his role as one of the country's leading political players. In 1295, William was sent to France as part of the king's attempt to gain an alliance with the King of the French. He remained in France for the remaining two years of his life, and died at Artuyl, on 20 August 1297. He was buried in the Church of the "Preaching Friars" on the Rue Saint-Jacques in Paris. His heart was returned to St Andrews and was buried in the wall of the church by his successor, William de Lamberton.

Religious titles
Preceded by William Wishart	Bishop of St Andrews; 1279–1297	Succeeded by William de Lamberton
