= Cellach II =

Cellach II is the fourth alleged Bishop of the Scots (fl. mid-10th century), the predecessor of the later St Andrews bishopric (the bishopric may not actually have been fixed at St Andrews at this period).

He is mentioned in the bishop-lists of the 15th-century historians Walter Bower and Andrew of Wyntoun as the successor of Máel Ísu I, and it is claimed by both sources that he reigned as bishop for twenty-five years after his confirmation at Rome. Bower calls Cellach's father "Ferdlag", and says that Cellach "was the first to go to Rome for confirmation".

If Cellach's predecessor's (i.e. Máel Ísu's) predecessor Fothad I did get expelled from the bishopric in 955, (and Máel Ísu succeeded immediately), and if Máel Ísu's reign really was eight years, then Máel Ísu would have held the bishopric between the years 955 and 963. This would mean, on similar logic, that Cellach would have been reigning from 963 until at least 988.

The early 11th century Chronicle of the Kings of Alba (CKA), in a passage referring to the reign of King Cuilén mac Iduilb (r. 966-71), says "Cellach filius Ferdalaig reg[navit]", i.e. "Cellach the son of Ferdalach reigned". This more contemporary source supports the idea that Cellach was ruling in the 960s and confirms the patronymic given by Bower. However, the CKA appears to suggest that Cellach's predecessor was a man called Máel Brigte, as the sentence "Cellach filius Ferdalaig reg[navit]" follows on from the sentence "Maelbrigd' episcopus pausavít", that is, "Bishop Máel Brigte rested". However, nothing more is known of this Máel Brigte; this suggestion is besides far from certain, and may refer to another bishopric.

The number of years for Cellach's bishopric after 988 would be dependent on the number of years between Cellach's appointment to the bishopric, and his alleged confirmation at Rome. The next bishop on the list is Máel Muire.

== Notes ==
Religious titles
Preceded by Máel Ísu I	Bishop of the Scots fl. 966x971	Succeeded by Máel Muire
