= William Scheves =

British archbishop

- Archbishop of St Andrews; Primate of Scotland
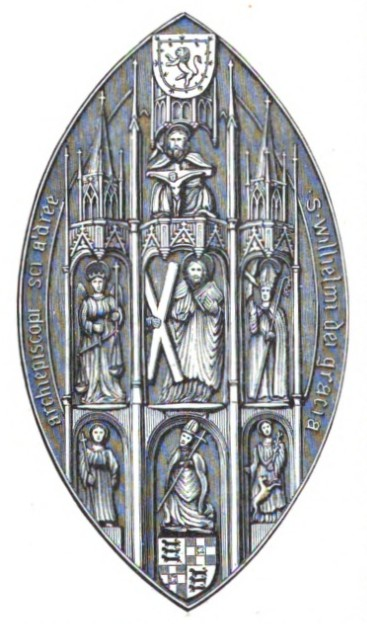
- William Scheves - seal, 1480
- Church: Roman Catholic Church
- Archdiocese: St Andrews

Personal details
- Died: 1497

William Scheves (sometimes modernized to Chivas or Shivas) (died 1497) was the second Archbishop of St. Andrews.

== Biography ==
William Scheves' parentage is obscure, but he was probably the illegitimate son of a royal clerk, John Scheves. Sixteenth-century accounts claim he spent several years abroad and studied at the University of Louvain. He spent several years at the University of St Andrews as an administrator. In his earlier ecclesiastical career, he had been clericus regiae (royal cleric) and master of the hospital of Brechin. In 1474 he was provided unsuccessfully to the Archdeaconry of Dunblane, but by the beginning of 1477 he was Archdeacon of St Andrews and coadjutor (successor) and vicar-general of the archdiocese. After the deposition of Archbishop Patrick Graham in 1478, he succeeded to the archbishopric, apparently receiving the papal pall while in the presence of King James III and many of the nobility at Holyrood. The titles of legatus natus and primate of all Scotland were bestowed upon him in 1487.

His rapid rise from junior clergyman to archbishop of St Andrews with a powerful role at court appears to have generated resentment from both ecclesiastical and lay rivals. As a result, he has been associated with the so-called "low-born favourites" or "familiars" who sixteenth-century chroniclers alleged surrounded James III in the years before 1482. Yet Scheves was not especially 'low-born', and was probably the illegitimate son of a former clerk register, John Scheves. There is little doubt, nevertheless, that he had an unusual level of influence with the King until the Lauder coup of 1482. In a highly unusual practice, he is found countersigning royal letters regularly in the later 1470s. After the coup, he was briefly disgraced, and although he was restored to favour after the king regained power in 1483, his influence was not what it had been.

George Buchanan, writing approximately a century later, claimed that Scheves studied medicine and astronomy at Louvain University; he certainly practised as a physician, and was acting as court physician for the king by 1471. He had an extensive library of medical texts and also had a keen interest in astrology. He was "one of the earliest book collectors on the grand scale in Scotland."

Scheves' likeness is preserved in a medallion portrait commissioned from Flemish artist Quintin Matsys in 1491 during a visit to Rome. Multiple medallions were struck from the design, and examples are held by the National Museum of Scotland and the British Museum, while a third was sold to an unknown buyer from the Neil Goodman collection by the auctioneer Spink & Son between 2016 and 2026 for $24,000 US dollars. A copy held by the National Gallery is probably a reproduction of a lost original.

It was suggested by A. P. Forbes, editor of the printed Arbuthnott Missall in 1864, that a painting of St Ternan contained in the manuscript was 'perhaps the bishop [sic] of the diocese, according to a custom not uncommon at the time'. The archbishop when the missal was written in 1491 was William Scheves, but Forbes does not provide any specific evidence to support his suggestion.

The Italian merchant Jerome Frescobaldi was the factor for his foreign debts, and received payments from the merchant and Conservator of Scottish Privileges Andrew Halyburton.

Scheves died on 28 January 1497.

Religious titles
| Preceded by Patrick Graham | Archbishop of St Andrews; 1478–1497 | Succeeded by James Stewart |
Academic offices
| Preceded by Patrick Graham; Archbishop of St Andrews | Chancellor of the University of St Andrews; 1478–1497 | Succeeded by James, Duke of Ross; Archbishop of St Andrews |
