= Cellach I =

Cellach I is traditionally said to have been the first Bishop of the Scots (fl. 878x889-906x), the bishopric later based at St. Andrews. He is mentioned in the historical writings of Walter Bower and Andrew of Wyntoun as a bishop of St. Andrews, but no pre-15th century sources say anything more than merely "Bishop". Wyntoun and Bower make him bishop as early as the reign of King Giric of Scotland (877x878-885x889). He was still bishop in the reign of King Causantín II of Scotland in 906 when, "in his sixth year King Causantín and Bishop Cellach met at the hill of belief near the royal city of Scone and pledged themselves that the laws and disciplines of the faith, and the laws of churches and gospels, should be kept in conformity with the customs of the Gaels". One interpretation of this passage is the demise of the "Pictish church" to the reforming Gaels, however it is certain that by the 15th century the bishop-list of the principal Scottish see was looking back at Cellach as its first bishop. His death date is unknown, but unsurprisingly he was certainly dead by the 960s when his successor Fothad I died as bishop.

== Notes ==
Religious titles
Preceded by ?	Bishop of the Scots fl. 878x889-906x	Succeeded by Fothad I
