= James Bane =

- Bishop of St Andrews
- Church: Roman Catholic Church
- Diocese: St Andrews
- Appointed: 1328
- Term ended: 1332
- Predecessor: William de Lamberton
- Successor: William Bell
- Previous posts: Archdeacon of St Andrews; 1325-1328

Orders
- Consecration: 1328 by Bertrand de la Tour

Personal details
- Died: 22 September 1332 Bruges, Flanders

James Bane (or Ben or Bennet) (died 1332) was Bishop of St. Andrews for a brief period in the early 14th century. In his earlier career, James had been a canon of Aberdeen and prebendary of Cruden.

James rose to the position of Archdeacon of St. Andrews, one of the most senior positions within the diocese. He was appointed one of the ambassadors to France along with Thomas Randolph, 1st Earl of Moray, Robert Keith the Marischal of Scotland, Adam de Moravia and Walter de Twynham in 1326 to renew the Auld Alliance with the signing of the Treaty of Corbeil (1326). Ten days after the death of Bishop William de Lamberton in 1328, the chapter held an election to fill the vacancy. James, although absent at the court of Pope John XXII at Avignon, stood against Alexander de Kyninmonth, Archdeacon of Lothian, and won. However, before news of his victory reached Avignon, Pope John, who had previously reserved his right to do so, had already provided James to the see. James was consecrated, sometime in the same year, by Bertrand de Turre, Bishop of Frascati.

In the aftermath of the Battle of Dupplin Moor on 12 August 1332, after roughly two years back in Scotland as chief-bishop of the kingdom, James fled to Flanders. He met his death at Bruges in the same year. The bishopric then lay vacant for over nine years, due to the turmoil of repeated invasion from England and civil war within Scotland. The prior and the chapter of the see had actually chosen a man called William Bell, dean of diocese of Dunkeld, but William Bell resigned all rights deriving from the election to Pope Benedict XII. William Landallis, rector of Kinkel in the diocese of Aberdeen, was appointed to the bishopric by Benedict on 18 February 1342.

Religious titles
Preceded by William de Lamberton	Bishop of St Andrews (Cill Rìmhinn); 1328–1332	Succeeded by William Bell
