= Máel Dúin (bishop of the Scots) =

Máel Dúin (died 1055) is the eighth alleged Bishop of St Andrews (or Cennrígmonaid). He is mentioned in the bishop-lists of the 15th-century historians Walter Bower and Andrew of Wyntoun as the successor of Bishop Ailín.

Máel Dúin is also known from other sources. A charter preserved in the Registrum of the Priory of St. Andrews, although probably translated into Latin from Gaelic at a later date, records a grant of the lands and church of Markinch by Bishop Máel Dúin (Maldunus) of St. Andrews to the Céli Dé of Loch Leven.

Máel Dúin is also recorded in the Irish annals. His obituary is noted in the Annals of Tigernach under the year 1055, when it records "Mael Duín mac Gilla Odran, espoc Alban & ordan Gaedel o cleircib, in Christo quieuit" that is, in English, "Mael Duín, Gille Odran's son, bishop of Scotland and glory of the Gaels from [their] priests, reposed in Christ". Bower calls him "filius Gillandris", suggesting that he was the son of a man called Gille Andréis; it is not clear whether Gille Andréis and Gille Odrain are versions of the same name, or if Bower and The Annals of Tigernach are contradicting each other.

Máel Dúin was succeeded in the bishopric by Túathal.

== Notes ==
Religious titles
Preceded by Ailín	Bishop of St. Andrews † 1055	Succeeded by Túathal
