= Gregoir of Dunkeld =

Gregoir, Bishop of Dunkeld (died 1169), served as Bishop of Dunkeld in the middle of the 12th century. Before being raised to the bishopric by King David I of Scotland, he was the abbot of Dunkeld. King David entrusted certain lands to Gregory, who was to hold them until there were canons on the island of St. Colme's Inch, a charge accomplished before 1169. The lands so entrusted included the island itself, “Kincarnathar” (probably Nether Kincairney), and Donibristle. Gregory appears in a great number of charters dating to the reigns of David I and Máel Coluim IV of Scotland, the earliest of which may date to 1135, although 1146 is the first firm date, when he appears alongside Bishop Andreas of Caithness in the Gaelic notitiae on the Book of Deer. He is not the last Gaelic bishop of the diocese, but his death marks the end of dominance of the bishopric by principally Gaelic-speaking bishops.

Religious titles
Preceded by Cormac	Bishop of Dunkeld fl. x1147–1169	Succeeded by Richard
