= Archbishop of St Andrews =

Office in the Episcopal Church of Scotland

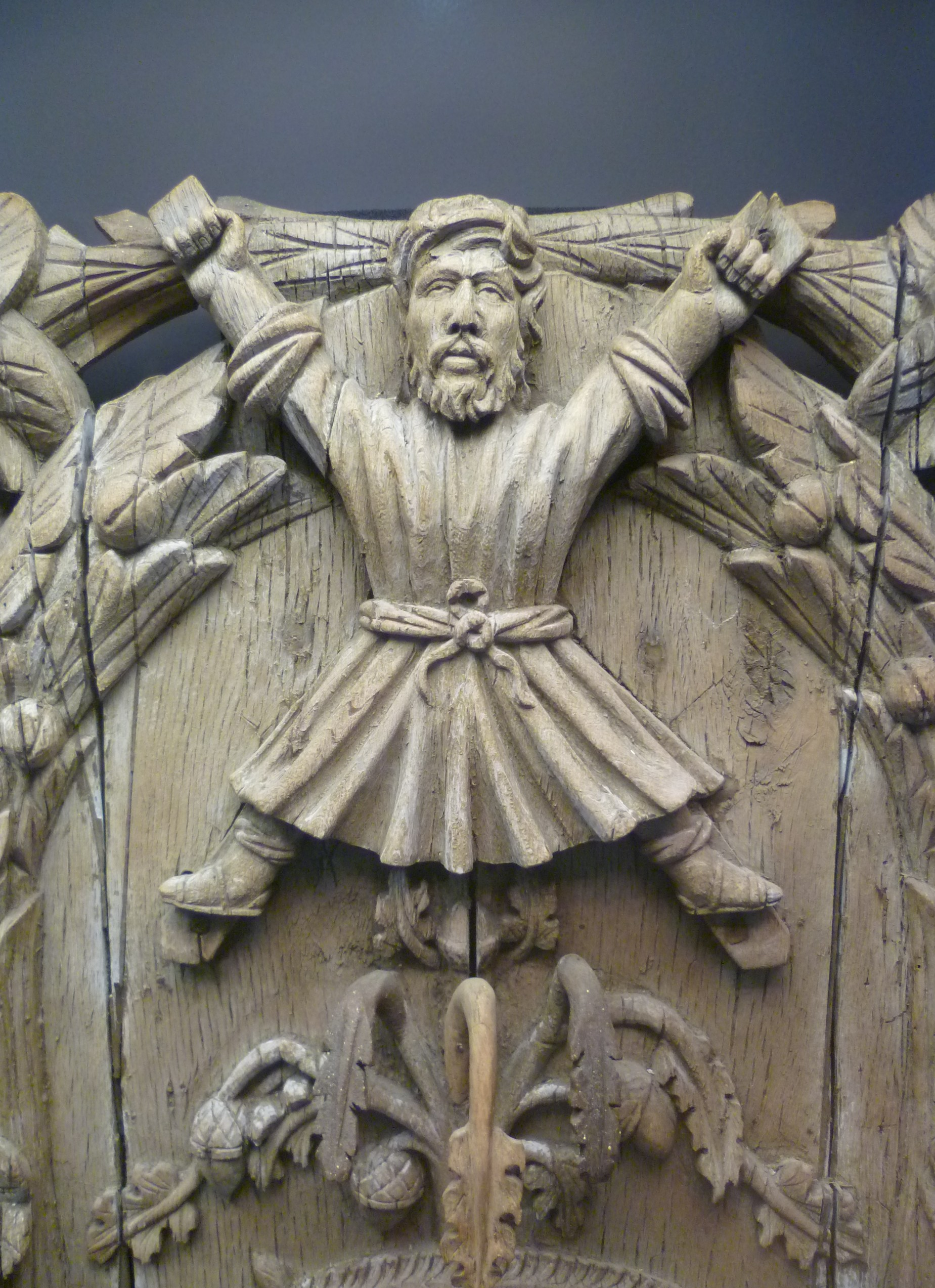
Saint Andrew depicted on a coat-of-arms of the burgh, now in the St. Andrews Museum

The Bishop of St. Andrews (Scottish Gaelic: Easbaig Chill Rìmhinn, Scots: Beeshop o Saunt Andras) was the ecclesiastical head of the Diocese of St Andrews in the Catholic Church and then, from 14 August 1472, as Archbishop of St Andrews (Scottish Gaelic: Àrd-easbaig Chill Rìmhinn), the Archdiocese of St Andrews.

The name St Andrews is not the town or church's original name. Originally it was Cellrígmonaid ("church of the king's mounth" hence Cill Rìmhinn) located at Cennrígmonaid ("head of the king's mounth"); hence the town became Kilrymont (i.e. Cellrígmonaid) in the non-Gaelic orthography of the High Middle Ages. Today St Andrews has replaced both Kilrymont (and variants) as well as the older English term Anderston as the name of the town and bishopric.

The bishopric itself appears to originate in the period 700–900. By the 11th century, it is clear that it was the most important bishopric in Scotland.

== List of known abbots ==
There had been a monastery there since the 8th century. It was probably taken over by Céli Dé (Culdees) monks in the 9th or 10th centuries, and these survive into the 14th century. It is the Gaelic abbey, rather than the continental priory, that the abbot was in charge of; the importance of the Céli Dé abbey has come down into the modern era in the street names of St. Andrews.

Only a few abbots are known. It is often thought that the position of Abbot and Bishop were the same until the Norman era, but clear evidence for this is lacking.

| Incumbent | Dates | Notes |
|---|---|---|
| Túathalán | d. 747 | His death in the Annals of Ulster constitutes our first literary evidence of any religious establishment at St. Andrews (then called by the Gaelic name Cennrigmonaid). |
| Unknown number of unnamed abbots | | Probably all the bishops before Fothad II, and perhaps before Turgot, were also abbots of the Céli Dé community. |
| Gille Críst | fl. 1172–1178 | That he is called abbot is evidence that the Céli Dé community were maintaining their independence from the priory in the period. |

== List of known bishops ==
The pre-11th century "bishop of the Scots" may have had no fixed seat before finally settling at St Andrews.

| Incumbent | Dates | Notes |
|---|---|---|
| Cellach I | fl. 878–906 | Bishop during the reign of Giric, and was still bishop in 906. |
| Fothad I | d. 963 | Bishop during the reign of King Idulb. The Chronicle of the Kings of Alba has his death in the period 962–966. According to the Annals of the Four Masters, he died in 963. |
| Máel Ísu I | 955/6–963/4 | According to Bower, he reigned for 8 years. |
| Cellach II | fl. 966–971 | According to Bower, he reigned for 25 years. |
| Máel Muire | fl. late-10th century | |
| Máel Ísu II | fl. late 10th century/early 11th century | |
| Ailín | fl. early 11th century | |
| Máel Dúin | d. 1055 | The Annals of Tigernach place his death at 1055. |
| Túathal | 1055–59 | The Annals of Tigernach place his predecessor's death at 1055, and Bower tells us he was bishop for 4 years, which makes a bishopric of 1055–59 likely, although it is possible that he did not succeed immediately. |
| Fothad II | 1059?–1093 | He performed the marriage of King Malcolm III of Scotland to Margaret (c. 1070). According to the Annals of Ulster, died in 1093. |
| Giric | 1093–1107 | He appears in Version A of the Foundation Legend of St. Andrews. He is almost certainly the Gregorius mentioned by Bower. |
| Cathróe | 1093–1107 | He is one of four bishops-elect listed by Bower (Giric, Cathróe, Eadmer and Godric). As the list is in chronological order, only Cathróe can have been bishop elect before Turgot, Eadmer being bishop-elect in 1120, after the death of Turgot. |
| Turgot of Durham | 1107–1115 | |
| Eadmer | el. 1120–1121 | Never consecrated. |
| Robert of Scone | 1123/24–1159 | Previously Prior of Scone. |
| Ernald | 1160–1162 | Abbot Waltheof of Melrose was offered the position before Ernald, but refused it. |
| Richard the Chaplain | 1163–1178 | |
| Hugh the Chaplain | 1178–1188 | Opposed by John the Scot |
| John Scotus | 1178–1188 | Opposed to Bishop Hugh. Never took possession of the see. |
| Roger de Beaumont | 1189–1202 | |
| Geoffrey de Liberatione | postulated 1202 | Bishop of Dunkeld, his postulation was rejected by the Pope, so he remained at Dunkeld. |
| William de Malveisin | 1202–1238 | Previously Bishop of Glasgow. |
| David de Bernham | 1239–1253 | previously Chamberlain |
| Robert de Stuteville | el. 1253 | not consecrated; never took possession of the see. |
| Abel de Gullane | 1254 | |
| Gamelin | 1255–1271 | |
| William Wishart | 1271–1279 | |
| William Fraser | 1279–1297 | |
| William de Lamberton | 1297–1328 | |
| Alexander de Kininmund | el. 1328 | Appears to have been elected but was superseded by John Bane. |
| James Bane | 1328–1332 | |
| William Bell | el. 1332–1342 | bishop-elect, spent ten years at the papal court, probably without obtaining confirmation |
| William de Landallis | 1342–1385 | |
During the Great Schism (1378–1417), Scotland recognized the Pope at Avignon, who recognized the following bishops:
| Stephen de Pa | 1385–1386 | Not consecrated; never took possession of the see. Was captured by pirates on his way to continental Europe, and kept prisoner in England. |
| Walter Trail | 1385–1401 | |
| Thomas Stewart | el. 1401–1402 | Never consecrated. He was the bastard son of King Robert II of Scotland, and renounced his rights soon after his election. |
| Walter de Danielston | el. 1402 | Not consecrated. |
| Gilbert de Greenlaw | postulated 1403 | Not consecrated. He had been Bishop of Aberdeen, but Pope Benedict XIII refused to confirm his postulation, and instead appointed Henry Wardlaw. |
| Henry Wardlaw | 1403–1440 | |
In opposition, the Pope at Rome appointed the following bishops, none of whom took possession of their see.
| Alexander Neville | trans. 1388–1392 | Exiled Archbishop of York, Pope Urban VI appointed him to St. Andrews. Died in 1392. |
| Thomas Arundel | trans. 1398–1399 | Exiled Archbishop of Canterbury, Pope Boniface IX appointed him to St. Andrews before being restored to Canterbury the next year. |
| John Trevor | trans. 1408–1410 | Formerly Bishop of St. Asaph. Died in 1410. |
After the conclusion of the Schism, the pope recognized the following bishops.
| James Kennedy | 1440–1465 | |
| Patrick Graham | 1465–1472/8 | Elevated to archbishop in 1472. |

== List of archbishops ==
The bishopric of St Andrews was elevated into an archbishopric in 1472 by Pope Sixtus IV. The Scottish church broke with Rome in the Scottish Reformation of 1560.

| Incumbent | Dates | Notes |
|---|---|---|
| Patrick Graham | 1472–1478 | Deposed for corruption and insanity in 1478. |
| William Scheves | 1478–1497 | Coadjutor since 1476. |
| James Stewart, Duke of Ross | 1497–1504 | |
| Alexander Stewart | 1504–1513 | Killed at the Battle of Flodden |
| John Hepburn | el. 1513 | Elect, not accepted by the Pope. |
| Innocenzo Cybo | 1513–1514 | He was the nephew of Pope Leo X, and appointed by the Pope instead of John Hepburn. Owing to lack of support in Scotland, an exchange was made with Archbishop Forman of Bourges. |
| William Elphinstone | 1513–1514 | Received crown nomination and chapter postulation for translation from bishopric of Aberdeen but died without possession on 25 October 1514. It is not known whether or not the Pope would have accepted his translation. |
| Gavin Douglas | 1513–1514 | Received crown nomination after death of Elphinstone; was not accepted by the Pope and became Bishop of Dunkeld instead. |
| Andrew Forman | 1514–1521 | Bishop of Moray, Archbishop of Bourges, obtained St Andrews through exchange with Cibo. |
| James Beaton | 1522–1539 | |
| David Beaton | 1539–1546 | Coadjutor since 1537. Also became a cardinal in 1538 and papal legate in 1544. |
| John Hamilton | 1547–1571 | |
| Gavin Hamilton | 1571 | Coadjutor since 1551. |
| John Douglas | 1571–1574 | |
| Patrick Adamson | 1575–1592 | |
| George Gledstanes | 1604–1615 | |
| John Spottiswoode | 1615–1638 | Died 1639 |
Abolition of Episcopacy 1638–1661
| James Sharp | 1661–1679 | First Archbishop of the Restoration Episcopacy. |
| Alexander Burnet | 1679–1684 | |
| Arthur Rose | 1684–1689 (1704) | |
In 1689, episcopacy was declared abolished in the Church of Scotland, but continued in the Scottish Episcopal Church: see Archbishop of St Andrews (Episcopal Church)
In 1878, 300 years after the Scottish Reformation, the Roman Catholic hierarchy was re-established. For the bishops (and their predecessors prior to the restoration of the Catholic see) of St Andrews in the continued Catholic tradition, see Archbishop of St Andrews and Edinburgh

== See also ==
- Archbishop of Saint Andrews and Edinburgh (for modern Catholic Archbishopric of St Andrews and Edinburgh)
- Bishop of St Andrews, Dunkeld and Dunblane (for modern Episcopalian Bishopric of St Andrews, Dunkeld and Dunblane)
