= John de Carrick =

Scottish bishop

- Born: Probably, 14th century Carrick, Scotland
- Died: c. 1380; Scotland
- Other names: John de Carrick
- Occupation(s): Administrator, Bishop, Canon lawyer, Chancellor
- Title: Chancellor of Scotland; Bishop-elect of Dunkeld

John de Carrick (died c. 1380), a native of Carrick, Scotland, was a 14th-century Chancellor of Scotland and Bishop-elect of Dunkeld. Although John's exact origins are obscure, he seems to have come from a branch of the old native comital family of Carrick. Later evidence suggests he was a graduate of canon law, but the university is not known.

He was Chancellor of the diocese of Glasgow by the early 1360s, during the episcopate of William Rae (1339–1367), and held Moffat parish church in Annandale as a prebend. In political circles, he was associated with Archbald the Grim, Lord of Galloway; perhaps with the latter's assistance, he rose in royal service during the 1360s, as Clerk of the Wardrobe, Keeper of the Privy Seal and then in 1370 Chancellor of Scotland. Despite the death of David II of Scotland and accession of Robert II of Scotland in 1371, John remained Chancellor.

In 1370 he was given the royal nomination to fill the vacant see of Dunkeld, which was free because of the death of John Luce that year. He failed, however, to secure papal approval, and the Pope instead provided Michael de Monymusk to the Bishopric. Carrick continued in royal service until 1377, after which it appears he was allowed to retire on the revenues of the burgh of Lanark. His death can probably be placed in 1380.

Religious titles
Preceded by John Luce	Bishop of Dunkeld (elect); 1370–1371	Succeeded by Michael de Monymusk
Government offices
Preceded by Patrick Leuchars	Chancellor of Scotland; 1370–1377	Succeeded by John de Peblys
