= George Brown (bishop of Dunkeld) =

Scottish churchman

- Bishop of Dunkeld
- Church: Roman Catholic Church
- See: Diocese of Dunkeld
- In office: 1483–1515
- Predecessor: Thomas Lauder (consecrated); James Livingston (unconsecrated)
- Successor: Andrew Stewart (unconsecrated); Gavin Douglas (consecrated)
- Previous posts: Rector of Tyningham; Chancellor of Aberdeen

Orders
- Consecration: 13 June 1484

Personal details
- Born: c. 1438 Probably Scotland
- Died: Dunkeld, 1515

George Brown (c. 1438 – January 1515) was a late 15th-century and early 16th-century Scottish churchman. He first appears on record in 1478 as the rector of the church of Tyningham, and is called a clerk of the diocese of Brechin. In 1482, he was selected to be Chancellor of the diocese of Aberdeen.

On 22 October 1483, he was selected to be Bishop of Dunkeld, despite the election of Alexander Inglis on 17 September the same year. On 13 June 1484, Brown had been consecrated at the Papal see. Brown, as orator regis ("the king's priest"), had been sent to Rome by King James III of Scotland to press the claims of George Carmichael to the bishopric of Glasgow. According to Alexander Myln, in his 16th century Vitae Dunkeldensis ecclesiae episcoporum ("Lives of the Bishops of Dunkeld"), Brown used the opportunity to become friendly with many of the cardinals, including Roderick Borgia, papal vice-chancellor and Bishop of Porto, the future Pope Alexander VI. Myln alleges that it was Borgia's influence that secured Brown's provision and consecration, even though, he alleges, it was against the will of the Scottish king.

Brown's position was not thus initially secure. In May 1485 the Parliament of Scotland supplicated the Pope to reverse his decision in favour of Alexander Inglis. Brown, however, had the support of Robert Lauder, Lord of the Bass, and through a mixture of pressure and bribery, secured James III's recognition of Brown. Brown returned to Scotland, landing at Inchcolm, part of the diocese of Dunkeld.

Brown's episcopate was comparatively long, though most of the details were not recorded. Alexander Myln attributes reconstruction of the diocese to Brown's episcopate, namely in the creation of four rural deans. This is supported by other records, whereby four new deaneries come into the record during Brown's tenure, although Deans of Angus (Rattray) and Atholl can be found in the 13th century.

Bishop Brown's last years witnessed the defeat and death of King James IV at the Battle of Flodden, while the bishop himself suffered from Gallstone. He died on either 14 or 15 January 1515, aged 76.

== Notes ==
Religious titles
Preceded by Thomas Lauder (consecrated); James Livingston (unconsecrated)	Bishop of Dunkeld; 1483–1515	Succeeded by Andrew Stewart (unconsecrated); Gavin Douglas (consecrated)
