= Robert Crichton (bishop) =

Scottish Catholic cleric

- Bishop of Dunkeld
- Church: Roman Catholic Church
- See: Diocese of Dunkeld
- In office: 1554–1571; 1584–1585
- Predecessor: John Hamilton see also Donald Campbell
- Successor: James Paton; 2nd successor: Peter Rollock
- Previous post: Provost of St Giles Collegiate Church

Orders
- Ordination: x 1571
- Consecration: November 1399

Personal details
- Born: early 1500s Scotland
- Died: Scotland, March, 1585

Robert Crichton (died 1585) was a 16th-century Scottish Catholic cleric.

== Biography ==
He was the son of Sir Patrick Crichton, Laird of Cranstoun. Robert was a younger son and chose an ecclesiastical career. From 1517 he was Provost of St Giles Collegiate Church. Additionally, he was Precentor of Dunkeld Cathedral between 1530 and 1534, and in 1532 almost took part in an exchange with Walter Maxwell for the Chancellorship of the diocese of Moray.

Crichton was the nephew of George Crichton, Bishop of Dunkeld, and in 1543 had been appointed coadjutor and successor to his uncle. As it turned out, 1543 was the year before Bishop George's death, and so when the latter event took place in January 1544, Robert regarded himself as the rightful bishop. However, this had taken place without the consent of the Scottish government. The government thus ignored the appointment, and placed John Hamilton in charge instead. Robert litigated against Hamilton in the Papal see, until in 1547 Hamilton was translated to the archbishopric of St Andrews Instead of giving into Crichton's claims, however, in 1549 the Governor of Scotland, James Hamilton, Duke of Châtellerault, gave the crown nomination to Donald Campbell, Abbot of Coupar Angus.

The dispute continued into 1553, with Campbell failing to secure papal recognition. When Mary of Guise took over the government from Châtellerault in 1554, she acknowledged Crichton's position and Campbell appears to have given up his claims to the bishopric. Crichton was therefore uncontested Bishop of Dunkeld, and accordingly resigned his position as Provost of St Giles. Towards the end of the decade Protestantism took hold in Scotland, and in 1560 the Scots formally broke their ecclesiastical ties with Rome. Crichton, along with John Hamilton, Archbishop of St Andrews, William Chisholm, Bishop of Dunblane, and Gavin Hamilton, Abbot of Kilwinning, were the only prelates to dissent from the Reformation Parliament of 1560. When the Jesuit Nicholas de Gouda visited Scotland in the summer of 1562 to initiate a Counter-Reformation, Crichton was the only cleric to give him an interview. Crichton's solid Catholicism was further revealed four years later when he assisted with the Catholic baptism of the infant Prince James in 1566.

Crichton was a firm supporter of Mary, Queen of Scots, and was one of the castilians who held Edinburgh Castle in her name between 1570 and 1573. For this he was forfeited by Parliament in 1571 and when in 1573 the castle was captured by James Douglas, 4th Earl of Morton, Crichton was imprisoned in Blackness Castle. In 1576 he was transferred to Edinburgh and kept in the ward of Lord Seton. He was restored to the bishopric of Dunkeld on 22 August 1584, but died in March 1585. He was buried, with the King's permission, in the St Giles', Edinburgh.

Religious titles
| Preceded by John Hamilton see also Donald Campbell | Bishop of Dunkeld; 1554–1571 | Succeeded by James Paton |
| Preceded by James Paton | Bishop of Dunkeld; 1584–1585 | Succeeded by Peter Rollock |
