= Richard of Dunkeld =

Richard of Dunkeld may refer to:

- Richard I (bishop of Dunkeld) (d. 1178)
- Richard de Prebenda (d. 1210), bishop of Dunkeld (as Richard II)
- Richard de Inverkeithing (d. 1272), bishop of Dunkeld (as Richard III)
- Richard de Pilmuir (d. 1347), bishop of Dunkeld (as Richard IV)
