= Gilbert of Dunkeld =

Gilbert of Dunkeld was a 13th-century bishop of Dunkeld. He began his career in the diocese as a chaplain to Bishop Hugh de Sigillo. When Hugh's successor as bishop, Matthew the Scot, died unexpectedly in 1229, it was Gilbert whom the chapter chose to elect as Matthew's successor. The details of Gilbert's consecration are unknown. It was during Gilbert's episcopate that Inchcolm Priory was elevated to the status of an abbey. The latter monastic establishment was in the diocese of Dunkeld because it had been an earlier Dunkeld foundation, dedicated, like Dunkeld Cathedral was, to Saint Columba, hence the name Insula Columbae, or in the vernacular, Innse Choluim, "island of Columba". On 22 May 1235 Pope Gregory IX wrote to Gilbert authorizing the elevation, and, moreover, instructing Gilbert to donate to the monastery a portion of the see's revenues. Gilbert died sometime in the year 1236, and was buried in Inchcolm Abbey. There survives one charter of bishop Gilbert.

Religious titles
Preceded by Matthew the Scot (unconsecrated?); Hugh de Sigillo	Bishop of Dunkeld; 1229–1236	Succeeded by Galfred de Liberatione
