= James Paton (bishop) =

Scottish cleric

- Bishop of Dunkeld
- Church: Church of Scotland
- See: Diocese of Dunkeld
- In office: 1571–1576 x 1584
- Predecessor: Robert Crichton
- Successor: Robert Crichton
- Previous post: Minister of Muckhart parish

Orders
- Consecration: November 1399

Personal details
- Born: 1522 Scotland
- Died: 20 July 1596 (aged 73–74) Muckhart

James Paton (1522 – 1596) was a 16th-century Scottish cleric from Ballilisk, an estate in the parish of Muckhart, west of Kinross. As Ballilisk appears to have been a rectory serving the adjacent chapel at Muckhart his family are presumed to have included priests who served the parish in Pre-Reformation days.

He matriculated at St Salvator's College, University of St Andrews on 26 November 1540. He appears to have trained in Theology and was likely a priest pre-Reformation. At the Scottish Reformation of 1560 he adopted the Protestant stance, and certainly by January 1565 is listed as minister of Muckhart parish, which was then in Perthshire.

After the forfeiture of Bishop Robert Crichton in 1571, Paton became Bishop of Dunkeld in July 1572. This seems to have been arranged for him by Archibald Campbell, 5th Earl of Argyll, to whom Paton handed over his farm at Muckhart Mill in addition to promising the Earl a share of episcopal revenue. This later brought him into disrepute with the General Assembly, as did his failure to proceed against the allegedly Catholic John Stewart, 4th Earl of Atholl. In December 1580 he was accused of conspiracy and treason and Paton failed to defend himself satisfactorily, and thereafter a decree was made depriving him of his bishopric. Paton resisted his forfeiture, but by 1585 was replaced by Peter Rollock.

Paton returned to his old parish of Muckhart, though not in the capacity of a minister. He died there on 20 July 1596. He is buried in Muckhart churchyard. The grave is marked by a "table stone" just east of the Christie enclosure east of the current church.

== Family ==
He is known to have had four children, including Archibald Paton, who served in Dunkeld Cathedral during his father's episcopate.

His descendants stayed in Muckhart until 1760 when James and Andrew Paton left to live in Alloa, working as weavers and dyers. James' son John Paton (1768-1848) established the successful Kincraig cotton thread mill, which spawned Paton's cotton company. The later descendants included the eminent Forrester-Paton family which included Ernest Forrester Paton, Colin Forrester-Paton and Catherine Forrester Paton.

Religious titles
Preceded by Robert Crichton	Bishop of Dunkeld; 1571–1576 x 1584	Succeeded by Robert Crichton (again)
