= John de Ralston =

Scottish bishop and administrator

- Bishop of Dunkeld
- Church: Roman Catholic Church
- See: Diocese of Dunkeld
- In office: 1447–1452
- Predecessor: William Turnbull
- Successor: Thomas Lauder
- Previous post(s): Rector of Douglas; Dean of Dunkeld

Orders
- Ordination: x 1429
- Consecration: 1448

Personal details
- Born: unknown Probably Scotland
- Died: Dunkeld, Scotland, 1452

John de Ralston was a 15th-century Scottish bishop and administrator. He was regarded as illegitimate, although today his parents are not known. Ralston appears in the records for the first time in 1426, where he is chaplain and secretary to Archibald Douglas, 5th Earl of Douglas. He retained this position on the death of Douglas in 1439. Between 1429 and 1443 he served as the fourth provost of Bothwell Collegiate Church, the home church of the Douglas earls. On 26 November 1445 he became dean of the diocese of Dunkeld.

From 1442, John was a member of the court of King James II of Scotland, and from the following year he is the King's personal secretary. At some stage he attended the University of St Andrews and obtained a Licentiate in decrees. In 1445 he was Prebendary (officially, Rector) of Cambuslang. He was in the process of obtaining a doctorate in canon law when, after the translation of Bishop William Turnbull to the bishopric of Glasgow on 27 October 1447, Ralston was elected Bishop of Dunkeld. He was consecrated by the end of April 1448, after making a payment of 450 gold florins. On 20 April 1448 he is recorded as secretary to King James II and keeper of the Privy Seal. In this year John and two other officials were sent to France as ambassadors in a mission to, among other things, find a suitable bride for King James; the mission went first to the King of France and then to the Duke of Burgundy. The bride chosen was Mary of Gueldres, a relative of the Duke and the daughter of Arnold, Duke of Guelders.

On his return to Scotland, Ralston became the King's treasurer. However, the autumn of 1449 brought the collapse of the dominance of the Livingston family at the Scottish court, and Ralston lost his position as a result of his association with this family. Ralston is recorded alive for the last time on 5 July 1451. He appears to have died before 28 April 1452 when Ralston's successor Thomas Lauder was recorded as being bishop-elect of Dunkeld. He was buried in Dunkeld Cathedral.

== Notes ==
Religious titles
Preceded by William Turnbull	Bishop of Dunkeld; 1447/8–1452	Succeeded by Thomas Lauder
