= Richard I (bishop of Dunkeld) =

Richard I (died 1178) was a 12th-century bishop of Dunkeld. He got the bishopric of Dunkeld—the second most prestigious bishopric in Scotland-north-of-the-Forth—after serving the King of Scots. He was capellanus Regis Willelmi, that is, chaplain to King William I of Scotland, and had probably been the chaplain to William during the reign of King Malcolm IV. He was consecrated at St Andrews on 10 August 1170 by Richard, former chaplain to King Malcolm IV but now the bishop of St Andrews. Richard maintained a close relationship with King William I and accompanied him to Normandy in December 1174, when the Treaty of Falaise was signed.

He died in 1178, allegedly at Cramond in Midlothian, and was buried on Inchcolm. However, both details may be the result of confusion with Richard de Prebenda, but burial on Inchcolm was common for the bishops of Dunkeld.

Religious titles
Preceded by Gregoir	Bishop of Dunkeld; 1170–1178	Succeeded by Walter de Bidun (unconsecrated); John

== Bibliography ==
- Dowden, John, The Bishops of Scotland, ed. J. Maitland Thomson, (Glasgow, 1912)
