= Walter de Bidun =

Roman Catholic bishop

Walter de Bidun († 1178) was a clerk of King William of Scotland, Chancellor of Scotland and Bishop-elect of Dunkeld. Walter was a witness to a charter that granted the mainland properties of Iona Abbey, then under the rule of the Lord of the Isles, to the Monks of Holyrood Abbey. He was elected to the bishopric of Dunkeld in 1178 after the death of the previous bishop, Richard. However, Walter did not live long enough to receive consecration, and in fact he too met his death in the year 1178.

Walter was the son of Halenald de Bidun, a landowner and minor lord in England.

Religious titles
Preceded by Richard	Bishop of Dunkeld; Elect 1178	Succeeded by John
Political offices
Preceded by Nicholas	Chancellor of Scotland c.1173–c.1178	Succeeded by Roger de Beaumont
