= Matthew de Crambeth =

Matthew de Crambeth (died 1309) was a late 13th and early 14th century bishop of Dunkeld. He had been a dean of the bishopric of Aberdeen and was a canon of the diocese of Dunkeld when, following the death of Bishop William, he was elected to the bishopric. He was consecrated at the hands of Pope Nicholas IV himself in 1288. His appointment appears to have had the backing of King Edward I of England. He was present at the Convention of Birgham on 17 March 1290. He was sent to France in 1295 by King John Balliol to negotiate with the French king. He joined other prominent Scots in revolt against the English crown, and subsequently had his possessions confiscated. He was ambassador to France in 1303. He is recorded as swearing fealty to King Edward on 4 May 1304, upon which act he had his personal and episcopal possessions restored to him. His personal property is known to have included lands in Kinross and in Fife. He died sometime in the first half of the year 1309.

Religious titles
Preceded by William	Bishop of Dunkeld; 1288–1309	Succeeded by William Sinclair
