= Alexander Inglis =

Scottish cleric and royal clerk

- Bishop of Dunkeld (elect)
- Church: Roman Catholic Church
- See: Diocese of Dunkeld
- In office: 1483–4
- Predecessor: James Livingston
- Successor: George Brown
- Previous post(s): Dean of Dunkeld (1470–96); Archdeacon of St Andrews (1480–96)

Orders
- Consecration: 1476

Personal details
- Born: 1400s Probably Scotland
- Died: 1496

Alexander Inglis (died 1496) was a Scottish cleric and royal clerk. He was the son of one George Inglis and his wife Margeret. At some point in his life he had attended university and obtained a Licentiate in Decrees. In 1477 he became Dean of the diocese of Dunkeld, and in 1480 became Archdeacon of St Andrews. On 17 September 1483, after the death of Bishop James Livingston, he was elected to succeed the latter as Bishop of Dunkeld. Inglis ran into difficulty on 22 October, when the Chancellor of the diocese of Aberdeen, George Brown, was also provided as Bishop of Dunkeld. Inglis was styled Bishop-elect in Scotland until 1485, but on 13 June 1484, Brown had been consecrated at the Papal see. Inglis continued to hold his previous posts as Archdeacon and Dean until his death in 1496.

== Notes ==
Religious titles
Preceded by Andrew Stewart	Archdeacon of St Andrews; 1480–1496	Succeeded by Robert de Fontibus (Wells)
Preceded by James Livingston	Bishop of Dunkeld (elect); 1483–1484	Succeeded by George Brown
