= John Leicester =

John Leicester may refer to:

- John de Leicester, 13th-century bishop of Dunkeld
- John Leicester, 1st Baron de Tabley, English landowner, politician, amateur artist, and patron of the arts
