= Donnchadh de Strathearn =

Donnchadh de Strathearn was a 14th-century bishop of Dunkeld. He was probably from the family of the Gaelic Earls of Strathearn, perhaps even the son of Maol Íosa IV, Earl of Strathearn. He was in the company of, as his brother Maol Íosa V was, Edward Balliol when the latter invaded Scotland and contested the crown of the young king David Bruce. Following the death of William Sinclair, bishop of Dunkeld, Pope Clement VI, who had previously reserved the see for his own nominee, appointed Donnchadh as bishop. This was in the year 1347. The canons of Dunkeld had actually elected another man, Robert de Den, as bishop, but this election was quashed. Donnchadh does not seem to have experienced many problems with King David after the latter's restoration. He attended David's parliaments and frequently attested his charters.

Donnchadh died early in the year 1355.

Religious titles
Preceded by Robert de Den (unconsecrated); Richard de Pilmor	Bishop of Dunkeld; 1347–1355	Succeeded by John
