= Andrew Stewart (bishop of Caithness, died 1541) =

Scottish noble and cleric

- Bishop of Caithness
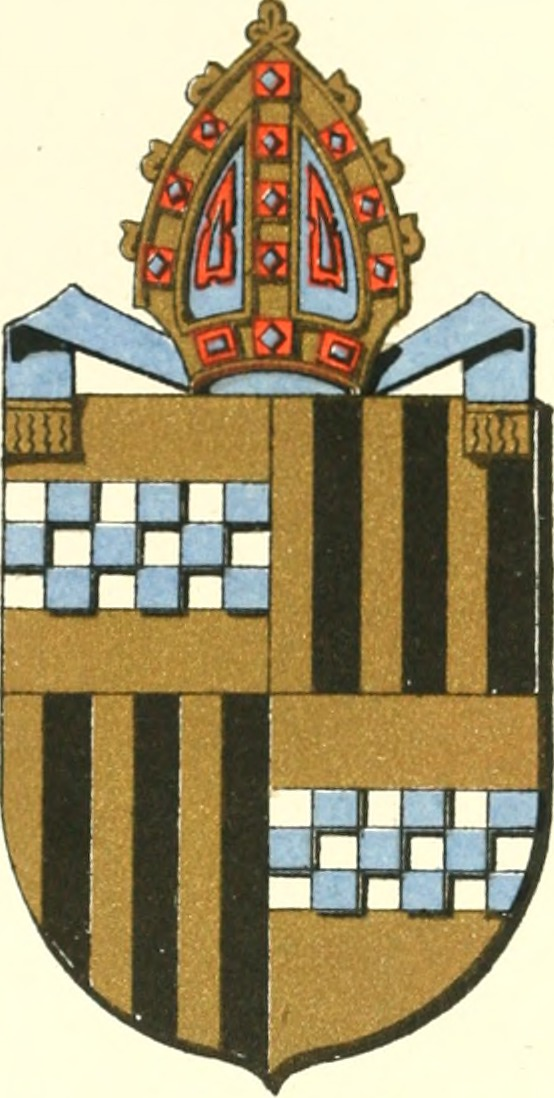
- Church: Roman Catholic Church
- See: Diocese of Caithness
- In office: 1517–1541
- Predecessor: Andrew Stewart
- Successor: Alexander Gordon
- Previous posts: Bishop of Dunkeld (elect: 1515–1516); Rector of Blair

Orders
- Consecration: 14 December 1517 (papal provision)

Personal details
- Born: 15th century Probably Atholl
- Died: Dornoch, 1541

Andrew Stewart (died 1541) was a 16th-century Scottish noble and cleric. He was a legitimate son of John Stewart, 1st Earl of Atholl and Eleanor Sinclair, daughter of William Sinclair, Earl of Orkney. His paternal grandmother was Joan Beaufort, former queen-consort of Scotland (to James I). Andrew chose an ecclesiastical career, held a canonry in Dunkeld Cathedral and was rector of Blair parish church (Dunkeld diocese), a church under the control of the earls of Atholl.

After the death in January 1515 of George Brown, Bishop of Dunkeld, a new bishop was needed for that bishopric. Queen Margaret, husband of the recently deceased James IV and mother of the young James V, backed to succeed Brown one Gavin Douglas, a poet and cleric who was Provost of St Giles church in Edinburgh. He was the uncle of the queen's new husband, Archibald Douglas, 6th Earl of Angus. The queen had put him forward on 20 January 1515, just a few days after Brown's death. Douglas had lately missed out on the position of Archbishop of St Andrews, and so this was in some way intended as compensation. Douglas had a proctor pay 450 florins to the Papal see, and Pope Leo X confirmed his position on 25 May.

Meanwhile, Andrew Stewart's brother John Stewart, 2nd Earl of Atholl, pressured the chapter of Dunkeld Cathedral to elect Andrew to the see instead of Douglas. Alexander Myln, in his 16th century Vitae Dunkeldensis ecclesiae episcoporum ("Lives of the Bishops of Dunkeld"), related that after hearing news of Bishop Brown's death, Atholl visited Dunkeld and requested that his brother be made bishop. As many of the canons were either related by blood to Atholl, or else held lands under Atholl's power, the pressure was significant and Andrew Stewart was accordingly elected to the see. A letter was sent to John Stewart, Duke of Albany, Governor of Scotland and guardian of the young James V of Scotland; Albany was in France and refused to deal with the disposal of any bishopric until his return to the country. When Albany returned in May (still 1515), he subverted Queen Margaret, confirmed the appointment of Andrew and compelled the chapter of Dunkeld to hand over the temporalities of the see. In July, the Queen agreed to Andrew Stewart's appointment and Albany imprisoned Douglas for breaking the laws of the kingdom, that is, on account of his purchase of the bishopric at Rome.

However, Andrew Stewart failed to secure confirmation from the Papacy. Albany gave up his support for Andrew and released Douglas from imprisonment; in September 1516, he agreed to Douglas' accession to the see of Dunkeld. Douglas was consecrated on 21 September 1516. On 24 July 1517, Albany wrote to the Pope requesting that Andrew Stewart be given the now vacant see of Caithness. The Pope agreed, and on 14 December 1517, Andrew Stewart became Bishop of Caithness. Thereafter, the sources leave almost no information about Stewart, and his 24-year rule of the diocese of Caithness goes largely undocumented, save only the occasional appearance, such as his attendance at parliament on 10 December 1540. He died intestate some short time before 9 August 1541.

== Notes ==
Religious titles
Preceded by George Brown	Bishop of Dunkeld; 1515–1516 (elect)	Succeeded by Gavin Douglas
Preceded by Andrew Stewart	Bishop of Caithness; 1517–1541	Succeeded by Alexander Gordon
