= Robert Cockburn (diplomat) =

- Bishop of Dunkeld
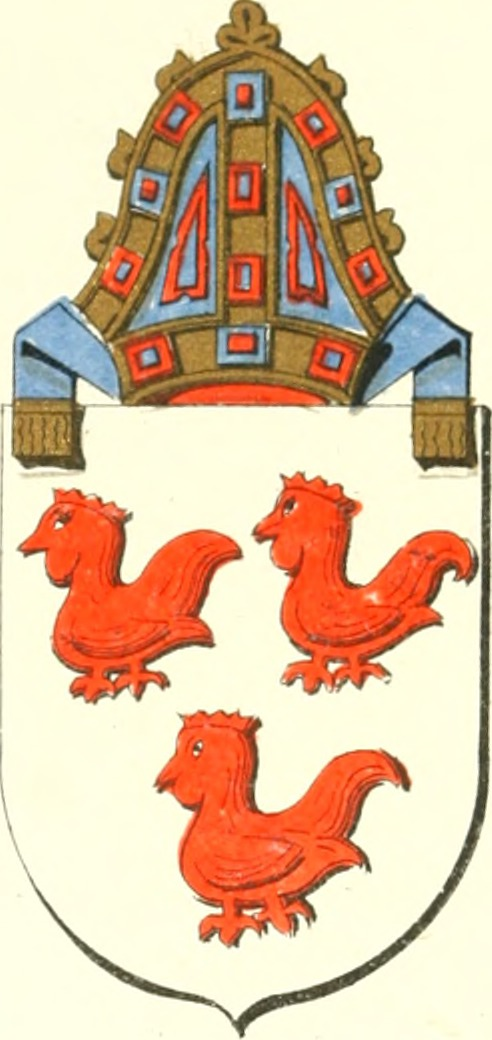
- Coat of arms of Robert Cockburn
- Church: Roman Catholic Church
- See: Diocese of Dunkeld
- In office: 1524–1526
- Predecessor: Gavin Douglas
- Successor: George Crichton
- Previous post(s): Bishop of Ross (1507–1524); Parson of Dunbar

Orders
- Consecration: Translated from Ross; 27 April 1514

Personal details
- Born: 15th century
- Died: Dunkeld (?), 1526

Robert Cockburn (died 1526) was a 16th-century Scottish diplomat and cleric.

Robert Cockburn was the third son of William Cockburn of Skirling and Cessford, and Marion, daughter of Lord Crichton of Sanquhar.

Cockburn was a university graduate, and appears for the first time in 1501 when he was presented to James IV of Scotland for the position of parson of Dunbar, being styled "Master Robert Cockburn, dean of Rouen". Cockburn was later praised for his skill in the Latin language.

He became Bishop of Ross in 1507, by which time he was holding the position of Chancellor of the diocese of Dunkeld. He had received crown nomination to the bishopric on either March or May, and was provided to the see on 9 July. Cockburn was a chaplain to Louis XII of France and acted as a diplomat for James IV of Scotland. On 10 July 1507, Louis asked Cockburn to request 4,000 Scottish troops to assist in the defence of the French possession, the Duchy of Milan. In October, James replied he would send military support if warned, and Cockburn was instructed to discuss another project. This was probably the Scottish king's plans for a crusade. Cockburn carried similar messages in 1512, in the crisis that culminated for Scotland in the Battle of Flodden

Robert spent most of 1515 in France as an ambassador for the government of King James V of Scotland (still a minor). In May 1517 he was sent to France with Patrick Paniter to re-negotiate the Auld Alliance. This negotiation lead to Treaty of Rouen. In 1524, he was in England as one of three ambassadors sent by the Scottish government to agree a truce. It was in that year, on 27 April, that Robert was translated to the bishopric of Dunkeld.

Robert became friends with Cardinal Wolsey, and wrote to him in February 1525 describing the political situation in Scotland. Regent Albany, having left Scotland for France, was still influential and his Dunbar Castle strongly fortified, while Cockburn's ride to England had brought him enemies. In May he addressed a short note to the English ambassador Dr Thomas Magnus, as "my hertly gud frend and broder."

He was Bishop of Dunkeld for only two years, dying on 12 April 1526. He was buried in the choir of Dunkeld Cathedral.

== Platonic circle ==
A letter by Robert, as Bishop of Ross, in recommendation of Symphorien Champier, a doctor of medicine at Lyon and the personal physician of Antoine, Duke of Lorraine, was published in the compendium Que in hoc opusculo habentur: Duellum Epistolare, et, Item Complures Illustrium Virorum Epistolae ad Symphorianum Camperium, Venice/Lyons (1519). The book discusses the French rights to the Duchy of Milan, the object of the requests for military aid carried by Cockburn. Symphorien also printed a catalogue of his humanist friends across Europe including John Liddel a Scottish philosopher, Patrick the Scottish physician of Anne of France, and the printer Jodocus Badius who would publish Hector Boece's History of the Scottish People.

== Notes ==
Religious titles
Preceded by John Fraser	Bishop of Ross; 1507–1524	Succeeded by James Hay
Preceded by Gavin Douglas	Bishop of Dunkeld; 1524–1526	Succeeded by George Crichton
