= Simon of Dunblane =

Simon
- Bishop of Dunblane
- Church: Roman Catholic Church
- See: Diocese of Dunblane
- In office: 1168 × 1178–1195 × 1198
- Predecessor: Laurence
- Successor: Jonathan

Orders
- Consecration: unknown

Personal details
- Born: unknown unknown
- Died: 1194 × 1198

Simon (d. 1194 × 1198) is the third known 12th century Bishop of Dunblane. Nothing is known of Simon's background as there are numerous Simons in Scotland in this period, both native and foreign. There is a Symon de Liberatione who witnessed a charter of King William the Lion and whom Watt and Murray suggested may have been the later Bishop of Dunblane, while there was in the same decade a local landholder and ecclesiastical patron in the diocese of Dunblane called Simón son of Mac Bethad.

Simon's name occurs as Bishop of Dunblane alongside Simon de Tosny, Bishop of Moray, and Hugh, Bishop of St Andrews, in a charter dated to 1178, though Watt and Murray believed at this stage he was only bishop-elect. This is because two unnamed Scottish bishops were consecrated at the Third Lateran Council in March 1179, and candidates for these bishops are otherwise short in supply.

He witnessed a charter of King William to Arbroath Abbey datable between 1178 and September 1184. He witnessed a charter of Melrose Abbey datable to between 1180 and 1198. He issued his own charter to Arbroath Abbey between 1189 and 1196, in which he gave certain rights pertaining to the church of Abernethy to the abbey. His issued a charter around 1190 granting the church of Inchaffray to "Isaac and his successors", Isaac being one of the pre-Augustinian monks.

His last appearance is as a witness to a charter of Gille Brigte, Mormaer of Strathearn, to what became Inchaffray Abbey, dated to either 1194 or 1195. His successor Jonathan appears as bishop in an Arbroath document which must have been issued between 1194 and March 1198.

== Notes ==
Religious titles
Preceded by Laurence	Bishop of Dunblane; 1168 × 1178–1194 × 1198	Succeeded by Jonathan
