= Laurence of Dunblane =

Scottish bishop

Laurentius
- Bishop of Dunblane
- Church: Roman Catholic Church
- See: Diocese of Dunblane
- In office: 1155 × 1161–1165 × 1178
- Predecessor: M.
- Successor: Simon

Orders
- Consecration: unknown

Personal details
- Born: unknown unknown
- Died: 1165 × 1178

Laurence (or Laurentius) is the first Bishop of Dunblane to be known by name. A document dating to 27 February 1155, had an M. de Dunblan, but no more is known of this man and it is unlikely that M. is a mistake for La..

Laurentius episcopo de Dunblain appears as a witness to a charter of King Máel Coluim IV of Scotland, a charter granted from Perth to the church of St John the Baptist of Perth in 1161. His next appearance occurs witnessing a charter of Richard, Bishop of St Andrews, sometime between 1165 and 1169.

A charter which Bishop Laurence himself issued to Cambuskenneth Abbey has survived; it dates to some time between 1165 and 1171, and granted the church of Tullibody to that monastic house. The grant had followed (i.e. was a confirmation of) an earlier grant from the local landowner, Simón son of Mac Bethad, and was only to take effect after the death of the rector, the royal clerk Hugh de Roxburgh.

This is the last notice of Bishop Laurence; he may have been bishop until 1178 at the latest, when his successor Simon appears in the sources for the first time.

== Notes ==
Religious titles
Preceded by M.	Bishop of Dunblane; 1155 × 1161–1165 × 1178	Succeeded by Simon
