= Hugh de Stirling =

Hugh de Stirling (Hugo or Hugo de Strivelin) was a 13th-century bishop-elect of Dunkeld. He appears to have been a canon of the diocese. His locational epithet, de Strivelin, "of Stirling", indicates some association with the burgh or sheriffdom of Stirling, either as a place of origin or as a place at which he practised as a priest. He was elected to the diocese of Dunkeld in 1283 after the death of Robert de Stuteville. However, Hugo died at the papal court in Rome whilst pursuing his consecration.

== Sources ==
- Dowden, John, The Bishops of Scotland, ed. J. Maitland Thomson, (Glasgow, 1912)

Religious titles
Preceded by Robert de Stuteville	Bishop of Dunkeld; Elect. 1283	Succeeded by William the Dean
