= William the Dean =

William the Dean was a 13th-century bishop of Dunkeld. He had been a dean of the diocese of Dunkeld, and was elected to the bishopric when news of the death of bishop-elect Hugo de Strivelin arrived from Rome. William soon travelled to Continental Europe for his consecration, and on the orders of the pope, was consecrated by Cardinal Ordonius, bishop of Tusculum. All of this happened by 13 December 1283, when it is related in a letter of Pope Martin IV. Unusually for bishops of Dunkeld, very little is known of his episcopate. The only thing that is known that he did after consecration was visit the shrine of Saint Cuthbert at Durham in 1285. As his successor Matthew de Crambeth is confirmed as bishop of Dunkeld in April 1288, it can be presumed that Bishop William died in either late 1287 or early 1288.

Religious titles
Preceded by Hugo de Strivelin (unconsecrated); Robert de Stuteville	Bishop of Dunkeld; 1283–1287X1288	Succeeded by Matthew de Crambeth
