= John Scotus =

Johannes Scotus or Skotus, John Scotus, or John the Scot may refer to:

- John Scotus Eriugena (c. 815–877), Irish theologian, philosopher, and poet
- John Scotus (bishop of Mecklenburg) (c. 990–1066)
- John Scotus (bishop of Dunkeld) (died 1203), Bishop of St Andrews and Dunkeld
- John of Scotland, Earl of Huntingdon (c. 1207–1237)
- Duns Scotus (c. 1266–1308), philosopher and theologian
