= Thomas Davidson (printer) =

Scottish, ca. 16th century

Thomas Davidson was licensed to be the King's Printer in Scotland during the reign of James V. He was born in Birse, Aberdeenshire, a son of Thomas Davidson of Auchenlayes, close to the beginning of the 16th century. His family held lands near to Huntly and on the monastic estates of Monymusk. Davidson did not remain in Aberdeenshire and is on record as being a Burgess of Edinburgh in 1528, the year the king finally came to power after a fifteen-year minority. Davidson's Edinburgh press probably began operations around this time.

His productions over the next decade-or-so included the first edition of Bellenden's The History and Chronicles of Scotland, 1536, as well as a commission from the king to publish The New Actis and Constitutionis of Parliament, the first ever printed edition of Scottish legislation. After many years in preparation this latter title appeared in 1542 and two of the three surviving copies are printed on vellum. Other works Davidson is thought to have printed include a conjectured c.1540 edition (now lost) of the long poem The Palice of Honour by the makar and churchman Gavin Douglas. In Davidson's childhood, Douglas had held ecclesiastical charge of Monymusk.

== Sources ==
- Printing in Scotland, by Duncan Glen
- Imprentit: 550 Years of the Scottish Printed Word, National Library of Scotland
- Auchenhamperis and Monymusk references for Clan Davidson
