= John Stewart, 1st Earl of Atholl =

Scottish nobleman

John Stewart
- Earl of Atholl
- Born: c. 1437 – c. 1442
- Died: 15 September 1513
- Cause of death: Died at the Battle of Flodden
- Buried: Dunkeld Cathedral, Perthshire, Scotland
- Spouses: Margaret Douglas, Fair Maid of Galloway (m. 1459; died 1473); Lady Eleanor Sinclair (m. 1475)
- Issue Detail: John Stewart, 2nd Earl of Atholl; Andrew Stewart (bishop of Caithness, died 1541)
- Father: James Stewart, the Black Knight of Lorne
- Mother: Joan Beaufort, Queen of Scots

John Stewart, 1st Earl of Atholl (c. 1437–1442 – 9 September 1513), also known as Sir John Stewart of Balveny, was a Scottish nobleman and ambassador.

== Life ==
He was the eldest child of Joan Beaufort, widow of James I of Scotland, and her second husband, Sir James Stewart, the Black Knight of Lorn.

He was created Earl of Atholl in around 1457, the first earl of the eighth creation of the title. He is believed to have had a hand in suppressing the rebellion of John Macdonald, 11th Earl of Ross, the last of the Lords of the Isles. John Stewart became ambassador to England in 1484.

According to 18th-century historian William Guthrie, John Stewart, Earl of Atholl was killed at the Battle of Flodden in 1513. He was buried in Dunkeld Cathedral in Perthshire.

== Marriage and issue ==
John Stewart married twice and had several children. However, the exact number, names, and the attribution of his children to their mothers is unclear.

His first wife was Lady Margaret Douglas, Fair Maid of Galloway, daughter of Archibald Douglas, 5th Earl of Douglas and Lady Eupheme Graham. Margaret had been married already to William Douglas, 8th Earl of Douglas, and to James Douglas, 9th Earl of Douglas which marriage was annulled by the Pope. She married John Stewart about 1459 or 1460. She died between 1473 and 1475. and they had three daughters:

- Lady Jean Stewart, married Alexander Gordon, 3rd Earl of Huntly.
- Lady Elizabeth Stewart, married Andrew Gray, 2nd Lord Gray.
- Lady Christian Stewart, married Neil Stewart of Garth.

Sometime before April 1475, he married as his second wife, Lady Eleanor Sinclair (died 21 March 1518), daughter of William Sinclair, 3rd Earl of Orkney and Marjory Sutherland. They had two sons and eight daughters:

- John Stewart, 2nd Earl of Atholl, who married Lady Janet Campbell (died about Candlemas 1545/6), daughter of Archibald Campbell, 2nd Earl of Arygll. Their daughter was Lady Janet Stewart, who married Alexander Gordon, 3rd Earl of Huntly.
- Andrew Stewart, Bishop of Caithness.
- Lady Jean (or Janet) Stewart, married by contract dated 31 August 1507, James Arbuthnott of Arbuthnott. He had a crown charter of the feudal Barony of Arbuthnott, 29 January 1507. He left a testament dated 7 March 1521, and died before 13 March 1521.
- Lady Catherine Stewart, married John Forbes, 6th Lord Forbes.
- Lady Elizabeth (Elspeth) Stewart, married Sir Robert Innes, 2nd of Innermarky.
- Lady Marjory Stewart, married Colin Campbell of Glenorchy.
- Lady Margaret Stewart, married William Murray of Castleton, who was killed at the Battle of Flodden, and is the ancestor of the Dukes of Atholl.
- Lady Elizabeth Stewart I, married Alexander Robertson of Strowan.
- Lady Elizabeth (or Isabel) Stewart II, married John Stewart, 3rd Earl of Lennox.
- Lady Jean Stewart, married Robert Gordon, Knt., of Pitlurg.

== Other ==
According to legend, the Earl of Atholl had whisky, honey and oats added to Macdonald's water well, which so entranced or intoxicated him that Macdonald was easily captured. The mixture became a drink named Atholl Brose.

Peerage of Scotland
New creation	Earl of Atholl; 8th creation 1457–1512	Succeeded by John Stewart
