= Matthew the Scot =

Scottish cleric

Matthew the Scot (died 1229) was a 13th-century Scottish cleric.

== Biography ==
Matthew had been the Chancellor of Scotland in the late reign of king Alexander II of Scotland. He was appointed in 1227 after the death of Thomas, Archdeacon of Lothian. His name indicates that he was a Gael or had some personal connection with Gaeldom, but we do not know anything else about his background, other than perhaps the fact that he supposedly had some kind of defect of birth. Matthew was postulated to the see of Aberdeen, before in turn being postulated to the higher-ranking See of Dunkeld. He was not consecrated as bishop of Aberdeen, and probably died before being consecrated for Dunkeld. He died in 1229.

Catholic Church titles
Preceded by Adam de Kald	Bishop of Aberdeen; Elect 1228–1229	Succeeded by Gilbert de Strivelyn
Preceded by Hugh de Sigillo	Bishop of Dunkeld; Elect 1229	Succeeded by Gilbert
