= Patrick de Leuchars =

Roman Catholic bishop

- Bishop of Brechin
- Church: Roman Catholic Church
- See: Diocese of Brechin
- In office: 1351–1383
- Predecessor: Philip Wilde
- Successor: Stephen de Cellario

Orders
- Consecration: 17 November × 11 December 1351

Personal details
- Born: unknown Leuchars (?), Fife
- Died: unknown, but after 20 June 1383

Patrick de Leuchars [also de Locrys or de Lochrys] was a 14th-century administrator and prelate in the Kingdom of Scotland. He first appears in the records in 1344 holding a church in East Lothian, and in 1351 attains national prominence as the new Bishop of Brechin. Bishop Patrick, who would be a core supporter of King David II of Scotland, became Royal Chancellor in the same decade. He held the chancellorship until around 1370, and the bishopric of Brechin until 1383, when he resigned it on account of his old age.

== Biography ==
=== Early career ===
It is likely that Leuchars came from Fife, primarily because his name connects him with the settlement at Leuchars, located in that province. He does not seem to have been university educated, a surprising fact given both the abundance of graduates in Scotland at the time and given Leuchars career as a senior royal administrator, a testament perhaps to the quality of non-university education that was available in Scotland at the time, perhaps in Patrick's case at St Andrews Cathedral Priory.

In 1344, he became parson of the important parish church of Tyninghame, East Lothian, a parsonage within the patronage of St Andrews Cathedral Priory, of which Leuchars was a canon. At some time in the following seven years, Leuchars took over the parish of Tannadice, a settlement to the north of Forfar in Angus; he probably obtained Tannadice on exchange for Tyninghame, though there is no record of this. He seems to have been a close protégé of Adam de Moravia, the Bishop of Brechin in the 1330s and most of the 1340s.

=== Bishop of Brechin and Chancellor of Scotland ===
On 17 November 1351, Leuchars himself received papal provision to the bishopric of Brechin. This followed an election earlier in the year which Pope Clement VI had quashed because the bishopric had been reserved for direct papal appointment during the brief episcopate of Leuchars' predecessor Philip Wilde - there was obviously no practical implication regarding the result. Patrick had received consecration - probably at Avignon - from Bertrand de Déaulx, Cardinal Bishop of Sabina, by 11 December.

Leuchars appears in the records as Chancellor of Scotland in the months between March and December 1353, perhaps having been appointed during the visit to Scotland of the king, David II of Scotland, who was briefly released from English captivity for some months in 1351/2; Leuchars was definitely not exercising his office of chancellor by 12 February 1354, perhaps because of his lack of favour with the Regent, Robert Stewart, who held power from 1354 until David's return in 1357. Leuchars was back in office after the king's return, regaining the chancellorship by 26 September 1357. Thereafter, Leuchars retained the chancellorship until sometime after, not more than a few months after, 4 March 1370; he was succeeded in this position later in the year by John de Carrick.

Leuchars is usually characterised as a steadfast supporter of the king, and he can be found throughout his period as chancellor attending to royal administration and close to the king. He witnessed dozens of royal charters, attended parliaments and councils, and sat on the exchequer until 1369. He also engaged on occasional diplomatic activity. On 13 December 1356, he and a number of other bishops were granted safe conducts to travel to London, in order to participate on a deal over the king's proposed ransom. Along with four other dignitaries he participated in an embassy to the French, for which these men were issued a safe-conduct in July 1360.

=== Resignation & death ===
On 31 May 1383, Pope Clement VII (of Avignon) provided Stephen de Cellario to the bishopric of Brechin; the mandate of provision noted that Stephen was already bishop-elect and present at the papal curia, and that Patrick had freely resigned the bishopric. On 20 June, two indults and a grant of a pension were made to Patrick, and the grant notes that he had resigned the see because of "his advanced age and infirmity".

Contrary to what was stated by Duncan, he was not present at the papal see, as the grant of the pension explicitly states that it was resigned "to Pierre d'Ameil, cardinal priest of S. Marco, at the papal court by the bishop's special proxy". The pension was an annual one of 100 marks, and was to be taken from Brechin episcopal revenues; one indult allowed Patrick to continue wearing episcopal vesture, while the other was an indult for plenary remission of sins, indicating that Patrick expected death. Patrick was never heard of again after that date.

== Notes ==
Religious titles
| Preceded by Philip Wilde | Bishop of Brechin; 1351–1383 | Succeeded by Stephen de Cellario |
Political offices
| Preceded by Thomas Charteris | Chancellor of Scotland; 1353–1370 | Succeeded by John de Carrick |
