= Maol Choluim de Innerpeffray =

Scottish bishop

Maol Choluim de Innerpeffray was a 14th-century bishop-elect of Dunkeld. He was a canon from Strathearn. After the death of bishop William Sinclair, the canons of Dunkeld held an election, which was held late in the year 1337 or early 1338. The result was disputed. Maol Choluim's election was challenged by Richard de Pilmor.

The dispute was taken to the papal court. Pope Benedict XII passed the question on to Bertrand Lagier, Cardinal Bishop of Ostia, for judgment. The cardinal declared the election of both null and void, but appointed Richard to the bishopric. Although we know that Richard died just three years later, Maol Choluim's death is unknown.

== Sources ==
- Dowden, John, The Bishops of Scotland, ed. J. Maitland Thomson, (Glasgow, 1912)

Religious titles
Preceded by William Sinclair	Bishop of Dunkeld; 1337 x 1338–1338 x 1342	Succeeded by Richard de Pilmor
