= List of listed buildings in Kinloch, Perth and Kinross =

This is a list of listed buildings in the parish of Kinloch in Perth and Kinross, Scotland.

== List ==
Name	Location	Date Listed	Grid Ref. (Note: Sometimes known as OSGB36, the grid reference (where provided) is based on the British national grid reference system used by the Ordnance Survey. • "Guide to National Grid". Ordnance Survey. • "Get-a-map". Ordnance Survey.)	Geo-coordinates	Notes	LB Number (Note: Historic Environment Scotland assign a unique alphanumeric identifier to each designated site in Scotland, for listed buildings this always begins with "LB", for example "LB12345".)	Image
Kinloch Parish Church				56°35′15″N 3°23′11″W	Category B	11222	Upload Photo
Marlee House Tomb Of John Brown Of Marlee Died 17.7.1858				56°35′07″N 3°23′09″W	Category C(S)	11224	Upload Photo
Kinloch Manse				56°35′17″N 3°23′06″W	Category B	11190	Upload Photo
Kinloch Churchyard				56°35′15″N 3°23′11″W	Category C(S)	11223	Upload Photo
Kinloch House, Now Hotel				56°35′26″N 3°24′43″W	Category C(S)	11193	Upload another image
Kinloch House Walled Garden				56°35′29″N 3°24′42″W	Category C(S)	11196	Upload Photo
Marlee House (Originally Kinloch House)				56°35′05″N 3°23′14″W	Category A	13742	Upload Photo
Bridge Of Drummad Over Lornty Burn				56°36′29″N 3°23′53″W	Category C(S)	11192	Upload Photo
Kinloch House, Stables				56°35′26″N 3°24′47″W	Category C(S)	11194	Upload Photo
Glasclune Castle				56°36′26″N 3°22′47″W	Category B	11191	Upload Photo
Marlee Home Farm, Former Coach House				56°35′08″N 3°23′07″W	Category C(S)	11189	Upload Photo
Marlee Home Farm, Farmhouse				56°35′08″N 3°23′08″W	Category C(S)	11225	Upload Photo
Kinloch House Lodge And Gates				56°35′18″N 3°24′33″W	Category C(S)	11195	Upload Photo

== Key ==
The scheme for classifying buildings in Scotland is:

- Category A: "buildings of national or international importance, either architectural or historic; or fine, little-altered examples of some particular period, style or building type."
- Category B: "buildings of regional or more than local importance; or major examples of some particular period, style or building type, which may have been altered."
- Category C: "buildings of local importance; lesser examples of any period, style, or building type, as originally constructed or moderately altered; and simple traditional buildings which group well with other listed buildings."

In March 2016 there were 47,288 listed buildings in Scotland. Of these, 8% were Category A, and 50% were Category B, with the remaining 42% being Category C.
