= Thomas Lauder =

Scottish churchman

- Bishop of Dunkeld
- Church: Roman Catholic Church
- See: Diocese of Dunkeld
- In office: 1452–1475
- Predecessor: John de Ralston
- Successor: James Livingston
- Previous post(s): Master of Soutra hospital; Chancellor of the St Andrews

Orders
- Consecration: 1452 x 1455

Personal details
- Born: 1395; Probably Scotland
- Died: 4 November 1481; Dunkeld, Scotland

Thomas Lauder (or Thomas de Lawedre) (1395 – 4 November 1481) was a 15th-century Scottish churchman. A graduate of the University of Paris, he served the Scottish king at the Council of Basel in the 1430s. Before he rose to the position of Bishop of Dunkeld, he had been Master of the famous hospital at Soutra Aisle, and the tutor to King James II of Scotland.

== Background ==
John Dowden states that "Thomas Lauder, Bishop of Dunkeld, was the son of an unmarried nobleman and an unmarried woman, and nephew of William Lauder, Bishop of Glasgow." However, Supplications to Rome state he was the "son of a knight and an unmarried woman". It would therefore appear that Thomas was the natural son of Sir Robert de Lawedre, Knt., of Edrington and The Bass (died before Michaelmas 1451), the only brother of Bishop William Lauder who was a knight. In 1414, Lauder was at the University of Paris registered for a Licentiate in the Arts.

== Religious hospitals ==
A Charter under the Great Seal of Scotland, confirmed by King James I of Scotland, grants the King's chaplain Thomas de Lawedre of the House of God or Hospital lying in the burgh of Berwick-upon-Tweed, to be held to him for the whole time of his life with all lands, teinds, rents and profits, etc., belonging to the said hospital, as freely as is granted to any other hospital in the Kingdom of Scotland; the king also commands all those concerned to pay to the grantee all things necessary for the support of the hospital. Dated at Edinburgh 8 June, in the 20th year of his reign.

By 1436 he had become Rector of the church or House of the Holy Trinity of Soltre, Diocese of St Andrews. The Great Seal mentions "Thomas de Lawedre as Master of the Hospital of Soutra" on 26 February 1439 (no.226); and as Canon of Aberdeen and Master of the hospital at Soutra, 20 May 1444 (no.298). On 7 October 1444, he sent a Supplication to Rome stating that he was the "peaceful possessor without adversary" and requesting the Pope (Eugenius IV) to give him a Dispensation "to rule and govern for life the said church or House of Soltre as a simple hospital and secular benefice". He also questioned the original Foundation of the hospital and the suggestion in the Supplication is that it be removed from the auspices of the Order of Saint Augustine.

== Royal tutor ==
Father Thomas Lauder had also been tutor to Prince James, the future King James II of Scotland, as evidenced by a Supplication to Rome made by the King on Thomas's behalf, on 26 November 1454, asking for the Bishop to be excused from visiting all parts of his diocese because "it is mountainous and inhabited by wild Scotsmen and certain enemies". In the Supplication the King points out that he presently requires Lauder "to reside in the Court of the King of Scotland at the mandate of the said king, whose counsellor he is and whose instructor and master he formerly was in the King's minority."

== Bishop ==
The Great Seal mentions Thomas de Lawedre as Bishop-elect of Dunkeld, 22 June 1452 (no.578) and Bishop of Dunkeld on 27 October 1453 (no.600) - 13 March 1480 (no.1469). In a Papal Bull by Pope Pius II dated 18 June 1462, he is styled "Venerabilis frater noster Thomas modernus Episcopus Dunkeldensis" (our venerable brother Thomas, present Bishop of Dunkeld). Whilst at Dunkeld he built a bridge over the River Tay near to the Bishop's Palace, and obtained erections of the Bishop's lands on the north side of that river into the Barony of Dunkeld, and on the south side of the river into the Barony of Aberlady. He founded several chaplainries and prebends, both in Edinburgh and Dunkeld, and made one of the first grants (five shillings) towards the Foundation of the Collegiate Church of the Holy Trinity in Edinburgh in 1462. He had been provided to the See of Dunkeld in 1452 where he exercised his functions very laboriously until the year 1476, when, being unable any longer to endure the fatigue by reason of his advanced age, he resigned the Bishopric in favour of James Livingston, the Dean.

Religious titles
Preceded by John de Ralston	Bishop of Dunkeld; 1452–1475	Succeeded by James Livingston
