= Adam de Moravia =

Bishop of Brechin

Adam de Moravia, sometimes also called Adam de Murray or Moray, was Bishop of Brechin between 1328 and 1348. As a supporter of the Bruce dynasty, he worked in the Scottish administration for both Bruce kings, Robert the Bruce and David II of Scotland. He later became the Lord Chancellor of Scotland under David II, and remained in office until 1335, when he was replaced by Sir Thomas Charteris, the first layman to hold the position. His protege was Patrick de Leuchars, who later also held both the office of chancellor and the bishopric of Brechin.

== Sources ==
- Penman, Michael, David II, 1329-71, (Edinburgh, 2004)
- Nicholson, Ranald, Scotland, The Later Middle Ages, (Edinburgh, 1974)
