= John of Atholl =

John of Atholl was a bishop mentioned only in the Orkneyinga Saga as being sent by King David I of Scotland on a diplomatic mission to Orkney. He is called a Bishop "from Atholl" which could either mean he was Bishop of Dunkeld or that he held another episcopal see but originated in province of Atholl.
