= M. de Dunblan =

Bishop of Dunblane reference from Pope Adrian IV

M. de Dunblan is the way the first known Bishop of Dunblane is written in a copy of a papal bull of Pope Adrian IV preserved in England; the bull dates to 1155.

The papal bull was addressed to the bishops of Scotland ordering them to submit to the metropolitan authority of the Archbishop of York; the copyist made two other mistakes in the initials of bishops, so it is not totally reliable.

Cockburn speculated that M. might stand for Máel Ísu; it is very unlikely that M. was a mistake for La., standing for Laurence the successor of M. at Dunblane.

== Notes ==
Religious titles
| Preceded by - | Bishop of Dunblane; 1155 × 1161–1165 × 1178 | Succeeded by Laurence |
