= James Livingston (bishop) =

Scottish bishop

- Bishop of Dunkeld
- Church: Roman Catholic Church
- See: Diocese of Dunkeld
- In office: 1475–1483
- Predecessor: Thomas Lauder
- Successor: Alexander Inglis
- Previous post(s): Rector of Forteviot; Rector of Weme; Vicar of Innerleithen; Dean of Dunkeld

Orders
- Consecration: 1476

Personal details
- Born: 15th century Probably Saltcoats, East Lothian, Scotland
- Died: Dunkeld, Scotland, 1452

James Livingston was a 15th-century cleric from East Lothian in south-eastern Scotland. Born at an unknown date in the 15th century, he was a son of the Laird of Saltcoats. He chose a career in the church, and became rector of the churches of Forteviot and Weme, and vicar of Innerleithen. By 1474, if not earlier, he had become dean for the whole diocese of Dunkeld. After the death of Thomas Lauder, Livingston was chosen as his successor as Bishop of Dunkeld. Although Livingston's appointment was contested at Rome by Thomas Spens, Bishop of Aberdeen, who wanted to be translated to Dunkeld, Livingston was consecrated on 30 June 1476. Livingston's episcopate is relatively obscure; he spent a good deal of time in Edinburgh, where he is witness to several charters. He died at Edinburgh, on 28 August 1483. He was buried in Inchcolm.

== Notes ==
Religious titles
Preceded by Thomas Lauder	Bishop of Dunkeld; 1475/6–1483	Succeeded by Alexander Inglis
