= Robert de Den =

Robert de Den († 1349) was a 14th-century bishop-elect of Dunkeld, Scotland. He had been the archdeacon of Dunkeld when, following the death of Bishop Richard de Pilmor, Robert was elected as the new bishop. The election took place on 28 January 1348. Robert was not to be consecrated, however, for unbeknown to the canons of Dunkeld, the pope had already reserved the see for his own appointment. Pope Clement VI appointed Donnchadh de Strathearn as bishop. Robert de Den died in 1349, probably at Rome.

Religious titles
Preceded by Richard de Pilmor	Bishop of Dunkeld; Elect 1347	Succeeded by Donnchadh de Strathearn
