= Andrew Umfray =

Andrew Umfray was a 14th-century bishop-elect of Dunkeld. He had been the precentor of Dunkeld when, following the death of Bishop Michael de Monymusk, Andrew was elected as the new bishop. He travelled to the Apostolic See to receive consecration, and was provided to the see of Dunkeld on 17 June 1377 by Pope Gregory XI. He died at the papal court, probably before receiving consecration.

Religious titles
Preceded by Michael de Monymusk	Bishop of Dunkeld; Elect 1377	Succeeded by John de Peblys
