= John de Leicester =

John de Leicester (or Johannes de Lacester) († 1214) was an early 13th-century bishop of Dunkeld. Before becoming bishop, he had been archdeacon of Lothian. He was elected to the bishopric on 22 July 1211. As bishop-elect, he is present when King William of Scotland paid homage to King John of England in 1212. He had been consecrated by June 1212, when a letter from Pope Innocent III to Walter, bishop of Glasgow, and Radulphus, bishop of Brechin, writes of the election and consecration of John, archdeacon of Lothian. John's episcopate would only last a few years; he died on 7 October 1214. His death occurred at Cramond, Midlothian, and was buried on Inchcolm.

Religious titles
| Preceded by Richard de Prebenda | Bishop of Dunkeld; 1211/2–1214 | Succeeded by Hugh de Sigillo |
