= Richard de Pilmuir =

Richard de Pilmuir [Pilmor, Pylmore] (died 1347) was a 14th-century bishop of Dunkeld (as Richard IV). He was a brother of John de Pilmor, bishop of Moray. He was precentor of the bishopric of Moray when, following the death of bishop William Sinclair, the canons of Dunkeld held an election. This happened in the year 1337. The result was disputed. Richard's election was challenged by Maol Choluim de Innerpeffray. The dispute was taken to the papal court. Pope Benedict XII passed the question on to Cardinal Bertrand du Pouget, bishop of Ostia, for judgment. In July 1344 the cardinal declared the election of both null and void, but appointed Richard to the bishopric. Richard, as bishop of Dunkeld, maintained connections with Moray. On 20 October 1345 he is found along with his brother at Elgin Cathedral. Along with other Scottish bishops, he signed a letter addressed to the pope asking requesting legitimation of Robert Stewart's marriage to Elizabeth Mure. He died sometime in November 1347.

== Sources ==
- Dowden, John, The Bishops of Scotland, ed. J. Maitland Thomson, (Glasgow, 1912)

Catholic Church titles
Preceded by Maol Choluim de Innerpeffray (unconsecrated); William Sinclair	Bishop of Dunkeld; 1337/44–1347	Succeeded by Robert de Den (unconsecrated); Donnchadh de Strathearn
