= Kinloch, Blairgowrie =

Coordinates: 56°35′13″N 3°23′13″W

Kinloch: Scottish Gaelic: Ceann Loch
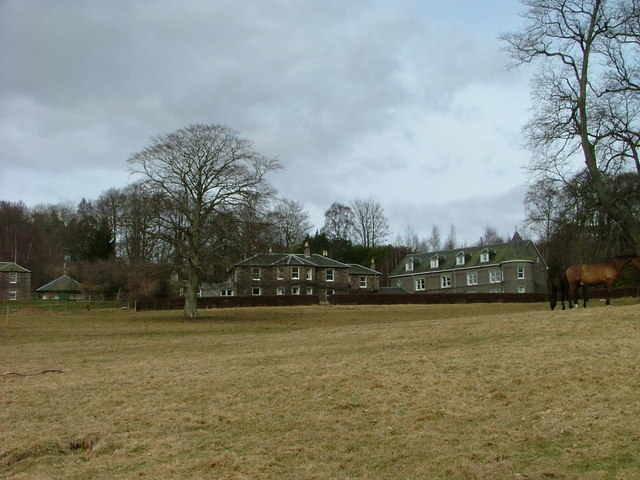
- Kinloch House Hotel, built c.1850

- Location within Perth and Kinross
- OS grid reference: NO1444
- Council area: Perth and Kinross
- Lieutenancy area: Perth and Kinross
- Country: Scotland
- Sovereign state: United Kingdom
- Post town: Blairgowrie
- Postcode district: PH10
- Police: Scotland
- Fire: Scottish
- Ambulance: Scottish
- Scottish Parliament: North Tayside; North East Scotland

Kinloch /ˈkɪnlɒx/ is a hamlet and civil parish immediately north of the Loch of Drumellie, about two miles (three kilometres) west of Blairgowrie in Perth and Kinross.

== See also ==
- List of listed buildings in Kinloch, Perth and Kinross
