= Michael de Monymusk =

Michael de Monymusk († 1376) was a 14th-century bishop of Dunkeld. He held a licentiate in Canon law. He had been dean of the bishopric of Dunblane, dean of the bishopric of Aberdeen, and then dean of the bishopric of Glasgow. While dean of Dunblane, he held prebends in the bishopric of Brechin and the bishopric of Ross, and while holding the deanery of Glasgow, petitioned Pope Urban V for a vacant prebend and canonry in Aberdeen. Pope Urban V appointed him to the bishopric of Dunkeld on 13 November 1370. He may have held the position of Chamberlain of Scotland. He died on 1 March 1376, and was buried in the choir of Dunkeld Cathedral.

== Sources ==
- Dowden, John, The Bishops of Scotland, ed. J. Maitland Thomson, (Glasgow, 1912)

Catholic Church titles
Preceded by John	Bishop of Dunkeld; 1370–1376	Succeeded by Andrew Umfray (unconsecrated); John de Peblys
