= Peter Rollock =

Scottish judge and bishop

Peter Rollock or Rollo of Pilton (c. 1558–1632) was a Scottish judge and Bishop of the Church of Scotland.

== Life ==
Peter Rollock was a son of Andrew Rollock of Duncrub, Perthshire, and his wife Marion Rollo, daughter and heiress of David Rollo of Bello. He became a Law student at St Mary's College, St Andrews qualifying as an advocate in 1573 and further gaining a Master of Arts degree in 1575. He did further studies in Law and Theology in Continental Europe.

In March 1585 he was appointed Bishop of Dunkeld in place of James Paton and adopted the role in April, although he exercised few episcopal duties, the purpose of his appointment being to administer the diocese and to be eligible to sit in the Parliament of Scotland. Rollock became a royal judge and councillor, becoming an Extraordinary Lord of Session in May 1596 and an Ordinary Lord in December 1598.

After travelling to England with King James VI in 1603 to take part in his coronation in the capacity of King James I of England, Rollock was Comptroller of the King's Household for two years, returning to Scotland in 1605. As King James began reviving episcopacy, Rollock was compelled to give up his bishopric, and James Nicolson was appointed in his place in 1607.

Rollock experienced a fluctuating position in the higher echelons of government, losing (1609) and regaining (1610) and then resigning (1620) his place on the bench, and going in (1587) and out (1610) and in again (1616) and then leaving (1625) the Privy Council.

On 21 September 1611 an attempt was made on his life by two sons of Matthew Finlayson of Killeith or Kinleith, with whom he was in the midst of a lawsuit. They fired on him en route from Restalrig to Pilton.

He died at Pilton House near Edinburgh on 30 June 1632.

== Family ==
He firstly married (1594) the twice-widowed Christian Cant, but had no children. He then married (1607) Elizabeth Weston, widow of John Fairlie of Bruntsfield and had one son, Walter Rollock.

== Sources ==
- Goodare, Julian, "Rollock, Peter, of Pilton (c.1558–1632)", in the Oxford Dictionary of National Biography, Oxford University Press, 2004, accessed 19 Feb 2007]
- Watt, D.E.R., Fasti Ecclesiae Scotinanae Medii Aevi ad annum 1638, 2nd Draft, (St Andrews, 1969)

Religious titles
Preceded by James Paton	Bishop of Dunkeld; 1585–1607	Succeeded by James Nicolson
