= Hugh de Sigillo =

Scottish bishop (died 1229)

Hugh or Hugo de Sigillo (died 1229) was 13th century bishop of Dunkeld, Atholl, Scotland. Little is known of his general background before becoming bishop. What is known in that he was a clerk of King William of Scotland and Abbot of Newbattle. Hugh succeeded John de Leicester as bishop on 5 October 1214. He was a frequent witness to royal charters in the period. The date of his consecration is not known. On 29 September 1226 he gave benediction to Radulf II, Abbot of Melrose. He died sometime in 1229.

Religious titles
Preceded by John de Leicester	Bishop of Dunkeld; 1214–1229	Succeeded by Matthew the Scot
