= Soutra Aisle =

Hospital and church buildings, in Scottish Borders, Scotland

- Soutra
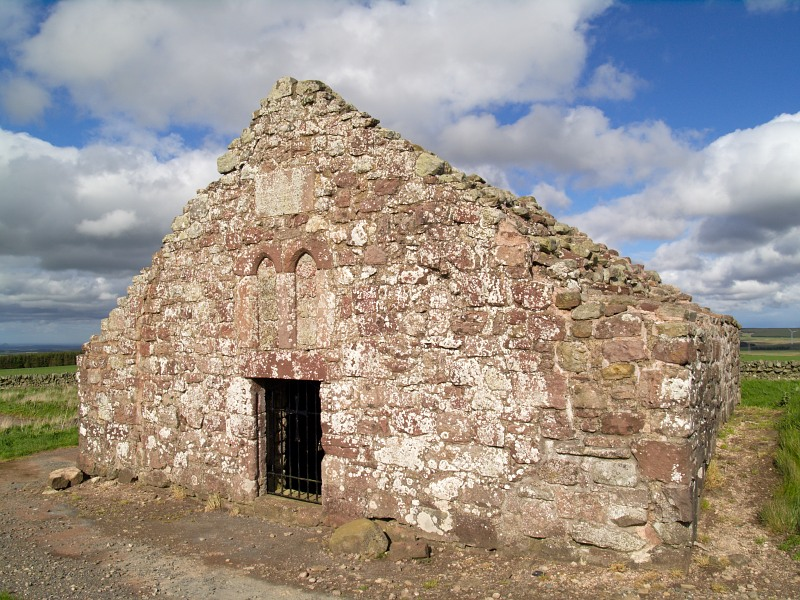
- Soutra Aisle, all that remains of the hospital and friary which was founded in the 12th century
- Interactive map of Soutra Aisle
- 55.8157°N 2.876°W
- Region: Scottish Borders

Site notes
- Public access: yes

Soutra Aisle, (the present structure lies just within the boundary of the Scottish Borders from Midlothian) not far from Fala, is the remains of the House of the Holy Trinity, a church that was part of a complex comprising a hospital and a friary. It lies half a mile along the B6368 from its junction with the A68.

== History ==
The complex was founded by Malcolm IV in 1164, when he granted it the lands of Brotherstanes up to and including the lands of Lyndean. It was built close to the Via Regia, the main route from the North to the Borders Abbeys; it was known as the House of the Holy Trinity and was run by an Augustinian Order.

The Great Seal of Scotland mentions Thomas Lauder (later Bishop of Dunkeld) as Master of the Hospital of Soutra on 26 February 1439 (no. 226) and 20 May 1444 (no. 298). A Supplication to Rome dated 7 October 1444 states that he "had been Rector of the church or House of the Holy Trinity of Soltre, Diocese of Saint Andrews, for over seven years". In the supplication dated 7 October 1444 the whole status of the foundation and the purpose of the hospital is discussed, where it is stated that it was "the founders intention to found there a hospital for the reception of the poor rather than a religious place". Its description of the site says: "the church is built at the top of a hill near a public way where there often fierce winds and frequent cold spells".

Following a scandal involving Stephen Fleming, the master of the hospital, the Crown confiscated most of the estates which had supported the hospital in the 1460s. These estates were granted to Trinity College Hospital in Edinburgh. This left Soutra Aisle impoverished and it only survived because it became the burial place of the Pringle family in 1686.

Recent archaeological works have revealed evidence of rare seeds ("medicinal products from all over the known world"), used for medicinal treatment. The experts found little above-ground evidence of the hospital because its stones had been removed long ago. Dr Brian Moffat, who led the investigation, estimated in 1993 that the peak years for the hospital were "from around the middle of the 12th century to perhaps the middle of the 15th" with perhaps 300 people residing there to deal with visitors and patients.

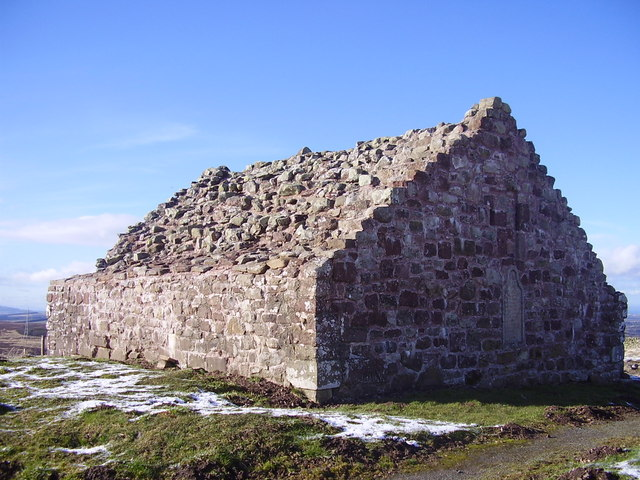
Soutra Aisle from south-west, showing roof detail

== See also ==
- Hospital of St John the Baptist, Arbroath
- Hospitals in medieval Scotland
- John Logan (minister)
