= John de Peebles =

John de Peebles [Peblys] was a 14th-century bishop of Dunkeld and chancellor of Scotland. He was a graduate of the University of Paris by 1351, where he became both a determinant and licentiate. He chose to remain there and soon became procurator of the "English nation" before obtaining a doctorate in Canon law. From 1360 he was an official in the bishopric of Glasgow and was master of the hospital of Peebles. By 1365 he was treasurer of Glasgow. Eventually he held canonries and prebends in that diocese and in the diocese of Aberdeen and controlled the church of Douglas. By 1374 he was archdeacon of St Andrews and the papal collector for the Kingdom of Scotland. He was provided to the bishopric of Dunkeld by Pope Gregory XI either in late 1377 or early 1378.

When the Western Schism began, he initially supported Pope Urban VI, perhaps still being in Continental Europe on the succession of Urban. However, in 1379 Avignon Pope Clement VII commissioned the bishop of St Andrews to absolve him from this, and granted John leave to be consecrated by any adhering bishop. He was Chancellor of Scotland between March 1377 and March 1390. He died sometime between 18 March 1390 and 1 February 1391.

Religious titles
Preceded by Andrew Umfray; Michael de Monymusk	Bishop of Dunkeld; 1377X1378–1390X1391	Succeeded by Robert Sinclair
