= John Luce (bishop) =

14th century Scottish bishop

John Luce (died 1370) was a 14th-century bishop of Dunkeld, Scotland. He had been a precentor of Dunkeld before being appointed to the bishopric by Pope Innocent VI on 18 May 1355. John had been elected to the bishopric some months before by the diocese's chapter, but the pope had reserved the see for himself. Thus the pope declared the election null and void, but still appointed John. Soon afterwards John was consecrated by Cardinal Peter de Pratis, bishop of Palestrina. John's episcopate is rather unnotable, and most of his legacy consists of a few charters. He was a witness to the 14-year truce signed between Scotland and England on 20 July 1369.

John probably died early in 1370.

Religious titles
Preceded by Donnchadh de Strathearn	Bishop of Dunkeld; 1355–1370	Succeeded by Michael de Monymusk
