= Bishop of Dunkeld =

The Bishop of Dunkeld is the ecclesiastical head of the Diocese of Dunkeld, one of the largest and more important of Scotland's 13 medieval bishoprics, whose first recorded bishop is an early 12th-century cleric named Cormac. However, the first known abbot dates to the 10th century, and it is often assumed that in Scotland in the period before the 12th century, the roles of both bishop and abbot were one and the same. The Bishopric of Dunkeld ceased to exist as a Catholic institution after the Scottish Reformation but continued as a royal institution into the 17th century. The diocese was restored (with a different boundary) by Pope Leo XIII on 4 March 1878; it is now based in the city of Dundee.

== List of known abbots ==
Dunkeld Abbey was an offshoot of Iona, perhaps founded in the early 9th century, in the reign of Caustantín mac Fergusa, King of the Picts. It is not clear when its abbots got independence from the Abbots of Iona, but a notable event is the alleged transfer of the relics of Columba to Dunkeld during the reign of the Scoto-Pictish king Cináed mac Ailpín. Its abbots, like many Gaelic abbots of the period, took a strong role in secular affairs, hence the term "lay abbot". The following is a list of known abbots of Dunkeld; the list is not exhaustive.

| Tenure | Incumbent | Notes |
|---|---|---|
| d. 865 | Túathal of Dunkeld | The Annals of Ulster, s.a. 865.6, records his obit and writes "Tuathal m. Artgusso prim-epscop Fortrenn & abbas Duin Caillenn", that is, "Túathal son of Artgus, chief bishop of Fortriu and Abbot of Dunkeld [dies]". |
| d. 873 | Flaithbertach of Dunkeld | The Annals of Ulster, s.a. 873.8, records his obit and writes "Flaithbertach m. Muirchertaigh, princeps Duin Chaillden, obiit", that is, "Flaithbertach son of Muirchertach, superior of Dún Caillen, died". |
| d. 965 | Dúnchad of Dunkeld | Dúnchad was killed along with Dubdon, Mormaer of Atholl in the battle of dorsum Crup, fought between king Dub and king Cuilén. |
| d. 1045 | Crínán of Dunkeld | Progenitor of the Dunkeld Dynasty, who ruled Scotland for more than two centuries. |
| fl. 1097 | Ethelred of Scotland | Son of king Máel Coluim III. |

== List of known pre-Reformation bishops ==
The Bishopric of Dunkeld was one of the largest in medieval Scotland. However, in 1200, half of its territory was used to create the new Bishopric of Argyll.

| Tenure (an "x" between two years indicates a range of possible starting or ending dates) | Incumbent | Notes |
|---|---|---|
| fl. x 1114-1131 x | Cormac of Dunkeld | |
| fl. 1138-1139 | John of Atholl | Not directly called "Bishop of Dunkeld", just a "bishop from Atholl" who went on mission to Orkney. |
| fl. x 1147-1169 | Gregoir of Dunkeld | |
| 1170-1178 | Richard of Dunkeld | |
| 1178 (elect) | Walter de Bidun | Never consecrated. Never took possession of see. |
| 1178-1203 | John Scotus | |
| 1203-1210 | Richard de Prebenda | |
| 1211-1214 | John de Leicester | |
| 1214-1229 x 1230 | Hugh de Sigillo | |
| 1229 x 1230 (elect) | Matthew the Scot | |
| 1229 x 1230-1236 | Gilbert of Dunkeld | |
| 1236-1249 | Geoffrey de Liberatione | |
| 1250-1272 | Richard de Inverkeithing | |
| 1273-1277 x 1282 | Robert de Stuteville | |
| 1282 x 1283 | Hugh de Stirling | Died at Rome pursuing his election. |
| 1283-1285 x 1288 | William the Dean | |
| 1288-1309 | Matthew de Crambeth | |
| 1309-1311 (elect) | John de Leche | Elect; nominee of King Edward II of England; his election was disputed, and he never actually took possession of his see. |
| 1309-1337 | William Sinclair | |
| 1337 x 1338-1338 x 1342 (elect) | Maol Choluim de Innerpeffray | A canon from Strathearn; his election was challenged by Richard de Pilmore; conflict was resolved at the Papal court, where the Pope found in Richard's favour. |
| 1337 x 1338-1345 x 1347 | Richard de Pilmuir | |
| 1347 x 1348 (elect) | Robert de Den | He was the Archdeacon of Dunkeld, and was elected to the see; however, the Pope was already in the process of appointing a bishop to the vacant see. |
| 1347-1354 | Donnchadh de Strathearn | |
| 1355-1369 | John Luce | |
| 1370 x 1371 (elect) | John de Carrick | Probably failed to obtain consecration. |
| 1370-1377 | Michael de Monymusk | |
| 1377 x 1378 | Andrew Umfray | Had been dean of Dunkeld and precentor; he died at the Papal court. |
| 1378-1390 | John de Peebles | |
| 1391-1395 x 1398 | Robert Sinclair | Translated from Bishopric of Orkney. |
| 1396-1437 | Robert de Cardeny | |
| 1437 x 1440 | Domhnall MacNeachdainn | He was the Dean of Dunkeld; he died in Continental Europe on his way to be consecrated by the Pope. |
| 1437-1440 | James Kennedy | Translated to the Bishopric of St. Andrews in April 1440. |
| 1440 (elect) | Alexander Lauder | He was nominated to the see in May 1440, confirmed the following month, but died in October that year before his consecration. |
| 1440-1460 (titular) | Thomas Livingston | He was the nomination of the Anti-Pope Felix V; he was probably confirmed by Pope Nicholas V, however he never gained possession of the see. He died sometime before 10 July 1460. |
| 1441-1447 | James Bruce | Appointed Bishop of Glasgow in 1447, but died the same year. |
| 1447 (elect) | William Turnbull | Was elected in March 1447 after the death of Bishop James Bruce; however, he obtained the Bishopric of Glasgow in November that year before being consecrated to Dunkeld. |
| 1447-1451 x 1452 | John de Ralston | |
| 1452-1475 | Thomas Lauder | Former Master of the hospital at Soutra Aisle. |
| 1475-1483 | James Livingston | Dean of Dunkeld who succeeded Bishop Thomas Lauder. |
| 1483-1485 (elect) | Alexander Inglis | Was elected but failed to ensure confirmation by the Pope. |
| 1483-1515 | George Brown | |
| 1515-1516 (elect) | Andrew Stewart | Brother of the Earl of Atholl. The Pope refused his nomination to the Bishopric, but did appoint him to the Bishopric of Caithness at Dornoch. |
| 1515-1522 | Gavin Douglas | Forfeited December 1521, and fled to England. |
| 1524-1526 | Robert Cockburn | Previously Bishop of Ross. |
| 1526-1544 | George Crichton | |
| 1544-1549 | John Hamilton | Previously Abbot of Paisley. Got promoted to the Archbishopric of St Andrews. |
| 1549-1553 x 1554 | Donald Campbell | |
| 1543/1554-1571 | Robert Crichton | Claimed to have been coadjutor to Bishop George Crichton since 1543. |

=== List of Schism anti-bishops ===
| Tenure | Incumbent | Notes |
|---|---|---|
| cons. 1379 | Robert de Derling | Anti-Bishop of the Western Schism. Consecrated by Peter, Bishop of Citta Nuova, in October 1379 on order of Pope Urban VI, in opposition to John de Peblys, supporter of the Avignon Pope. Never took possession of see. |
| bp. 1379 | Nicholas Duffield | English abbot (of Pershore); was the nomination of the Pope against the candidate of the Avignon Pope during the Western Schism. Never took possession of see. |

== List of post-Reformation bishops ==
=== Church of Scotland succession ===
In 1560 the Church of Scotland broke its ties with Rome.

| Tenure | Incumbent | Notes |
|---|---|---|
| 1571-x 1584 | James Paton | |
| 1584–1585 | Robert Crichton | |
| 1585–1607 | Peter Rollock | |
| 1607 | James Nicolson | |
| 1607–1638 | Alexander Lindsay | Died 1639 |
| 1638–1662 | Episcopacy briefly abolished | |
| 1662–1665 | George Haliburton | |
| 1665–1676 | Henry Guthrie | |
| 1677–1679 | William Lindsay | |
| 1679–1686 | Andrew Bruce | |
| 1686–1689 | John Hamilton | Deprived of the temporalities in 1689 when episcopacy was permanently abolished in the Church of Scotland following the Glorious Revolution. |

=== Scottish Episcopal Church succession ===
| Tenure | Incumbent | Notes |
|---|---|---|
| 1689–1690 | John Hamilton | Formerly Church of Scotland bishop, continued as an Episcopalian until his death in 1690 |
| 1690–1731 | See vacant | |
| 1731–1743 | Thomas Rattray | Consecrated a college bishop in 1727; also Primus 1738-43; died 22 August 1768 |
| 1743–1776 | John Alexander | Also administered the See of Dunblane 1743–1774; died in office. |
| 1776–1786 | Charles Rose | Also Bishop of Dunblane 1774–1791; died in office. |
| 1786–1792 | See vacant | |
| 1792–1808 | Jonathan Watson | |
| 1808–1837 | Patrick Torry | Consecrated as Bishop of Dunkeld and Dunblane; became Bishop of Fife, Dunkeld and Dunblane in 1837, and subsequently Bishop of St Andrews, Dunkeld and Dunblane in 1844. |
The Scottish Episcopal see became part of the Diocese of Fife, Dunkeld and Dunblane in 1837, which was renamed the Diocese of St Andrews, Dunkeld and Dunblane in 1844.

=== Roman Catholic succession ===
The Bishop of Dunkeld is the Ordinary of the Catholic Diocese of Dunkeld in the Province of Saint Andrews and Edinburgh. The diocese covers an area of 9,505 km^{2}. The see is in the City of Dundee where the seat is located at the Cathedral Church of Saint Andrew. The post Reformation diocese was restored by Pope Leo XIII on 4 March 1878. The Right Reverend Andrew McKenzie is the 10th bishop of the diocese since its creation.

(Any dates appearing in italics indicate de facto continuation of office. The start date of tenure below is the date of appointment or succession. Where known, the date of installation and ordination as bishop are listed in the notes together with the post held prior to appointment.)

| Tenure | Incumbent | Notes |
|---|---|---|
| 22 March 1878 to 18 January 1887 | George Rigg | Priest; ordained 26 May 1878; died in office |
| 14 August 1890 to 30 August 1900 | James Smith | Priest; ordained 28 October 1890; appointed Archbishop of Saint Andrews and Edinburgh |
| 21 February 1901 to 24 September 1912 | Angus MacFarlane | Priest; ordained 1 May 1901; died in office |
| 24 September 1912 to 14 May 1913 | sede vacante | |
| 14 May 1913 to 28 March 1914 | Robert Fraser | Priest; ordained 25 May 1913; Died in office |
| 28 March 1914 to 8 September 1914 | sede vacante | |
| 8 September 1914 to 31 May 1949 | John Toner | Priest; ordained 15 October 1914; died in office |
| 31 May 1949 to 23 May 1955 | James Scanlan | Coadjutor Bishop of Dunkeld; appointed Bishop of Motherwell |
| 27 May 1955 to 26 January 1981 | William Hart | Priest; ordained 21 September 1955; retired |
| 26 January 1981 to 30 June 2012 | Vincent Logan | Priest; ordained 26 February 1981; retired |
| 30 June 2012 to 9 January 2014 | sede vacante | |
| 9 January 2014 to 28 December 2022 | Stephen Robson | Auxiliary Bishop of St Andrews & Edinburgh |
| 28 December 2022 to 2 February 2024 | sede vacante | |
| 2 February 2024 to 10 April 2024 (elect) | Martin Chambers | Priest; died before episcopal consecration and installation. |
| 10 April 2024 to 27 May 2024 | sede vacante | |
| 27 May 2024 to present | Andrew McKenzie | Priest |

== See also ==
- Anglican Diocese of Saint Andrews, Dunkeld and Dunblane
