= Richard de Prebenda =

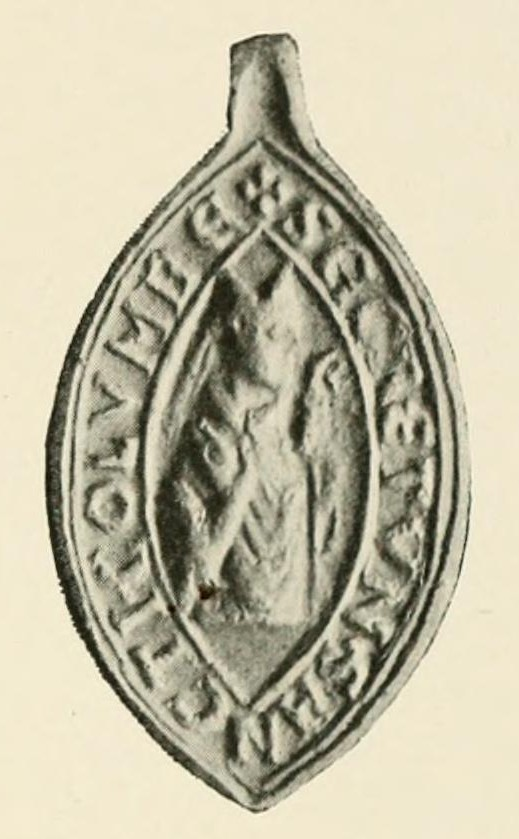
Seal of Richard de Prebenda

Richard de Prebenda (died 1210) was an early 13th-century bishop of Dunkeld. He had previously been a clerk of King William of Scotland and was appointed to the bishopric in 1203. Records indicate a commission of Pope Innocent III attempting to resolve a dispute between Richard and the prior of St Andrews regarding control of the church of Meigle. He died in May 1210, at Cramond in Midlothian, and was buried on the island of Inchcolm (Innse Choluim).

Religious titles
Preceded by John	Bishop of Dunkeld; 1203–1210	Succeeded by John de Leicester
