= Richard the Chaplain =

Richard the Chaplain - seal, c. 1173

Richard the Chaplain (or Ricardus Capellanus) was the Chaplain of King Máel Coluim IV before becoming Bishop of Cell Rígmonaid (St Andrews), the highest ranking Scottish see of the period. He came from a well connected Anglo-Norman Lothian-based family, and was the nephew of Alwin, Abbot of Holyrood. Richard was elected to the see in 1163, soon after the death of his predecessor Ernald, and was consecrated on Palm Sunday 1165 by other Scottish bishops in the presence of the king. He died in 1178 in the infirmary of the canons of the church. He was succeeded by John, called "l'Escot" (the Scot).

Religious titles
Preceded by Ernald	Bishop of Cell Rígmonaid (St Andrews) bp. 1163/5-78	Succeeded by John
