= Dunkeld Cathedral =

Coordinates: 56°33′54″N 3°35′23″W

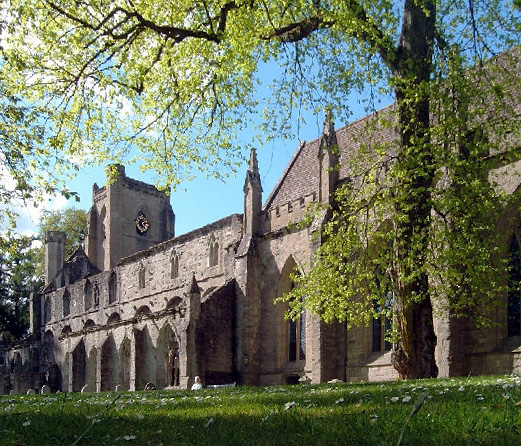
- Dunkeld Cathedral
- Location: Dunkeld, Perth and Kinross
- Country: Scotland
- Denomination: Church of Scotland
- Previous denomination: Roman Catholic

History
- Founded: 1260
- Dedication: St Columba

Architecture
- Heritage designation: Scheduled monument
- Designated: 10 October 1994

Administration
- Diocese: Diocese of Dunkeld (historic)

Dunkeld Cathedral is a Church of Scotland place of worship which stands on the north bank of the River Tay in Dunkeld, Perth and Kinross, Scotland. Built in square-stone style of predominantly grey sandstone, the cathedral proper began in 1260 and was completed in 1501. It stands on the site of the former Culdee Monastery of Dunkeld, stones from which can be seen as an irregular reddish streak in the eastern gable.

It is not formally a 'cathedral', as the Church of Scotland nowadays has neither cathedrals nor bishops, but it is one of a number of similar former cathedrals which has continued to carry the name.

== History ==
Because of the long construction period, the cathedral shows mixed architecture. Gothic and Norman elements are intermingled throughout the structure. Although partly in ruins, the cathedral is in regular use today and is open to the public.

Relics of Saint Columba, including his bones, were said to have been kept at Dunkeld until the Reformation, at which time they were removed to Ireland. Some believe there are still undiscovered Columban relics buried within the cathedral grounds.

The original monastery at Dunkeld dated from the sixth or early seventh century, founded after an expedition of Saint Columba to the Land of Alba. It was at first a simple collection of wattle huts. During the ninth century Causantín mac Fergusa constructed a more substantial cathedral of reddish sandstone and declared Dunkeld to hold the Primacy (centre) of the faith in Alba.

For reasons not completely understood, the Celtic bell believed to have been used at the monastery is not preserved in the cathedral. Instead, it was used in the Little Dunkeld Church, the parish church of the district of Minor or Lesser Dunkeld. Possibly this was because the later canons regarded Culdeeism as heresy and refused relics or saints of that discipline.

In the 17th century, the Bishopric of Dunkeld became an appendage of the Crown and subsequently descended to the Earls of Fife. Dunkeld Cathedral is today a Crown property, through Historic Environment Scotland, and a scheduled monument.

In 1689 the Battle of Dunkeld was fought around the cathedral between the Jacobite Highland clans loyal to James II and VII – deposed in the Glorious Revolution the previous year – and a government force supporting William III and II, with the latter winning the day.

== Parish ==
Dunkeld Cathedral is still used as the town's Church of Scotland parish church, with services every Sunday (although the congregation uses the smaller "Little Dunkeld" Church during winter months.) The current minister (since 2001) is the Reverend R. Fraser Penny.

The small Chapter House Museum offers a collection of relics from monastic and medieval times, and local history exhibits.

== Burials ==
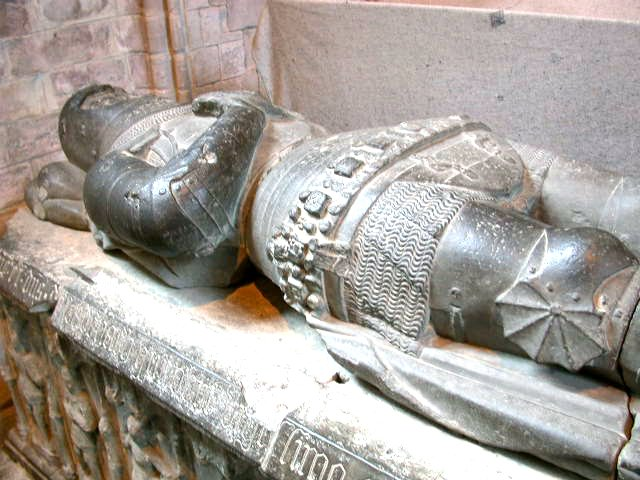
Tomb of Alexander Stewart, Earl of Buchan, c. 1420

Alexander Stewart, Earl of Buchan, known as "the Wolf of Badenoch", was buried in the cathedral following his death in 1394, where his tomb, surmounted by his armoured effigy, can still be seen.

Other noteworthy burials include:

- John Scotus, (1183–1203)
- Geoffrey de Liberatione, Bishop of Dunkeld (1236/7–1249)
- Richard de Inverkeithing, a chamberlain of King Alexander II of Scotland and Bishop of Dunkeld (1250/2–1272)
- William Sinclair, Bishop of Dunkeld (1309–1337)
- Michael de Monymusk, Bishop of Dunkeld (1370–1376)
- The 1st Earl of Atholl (c. 1440–1512)
- Robert Cockburn, Bishop of Dunkeld (1524–1526)
- Charles Edward Stuart, Count Roehenstart (1784–1854)

== Gallery ==
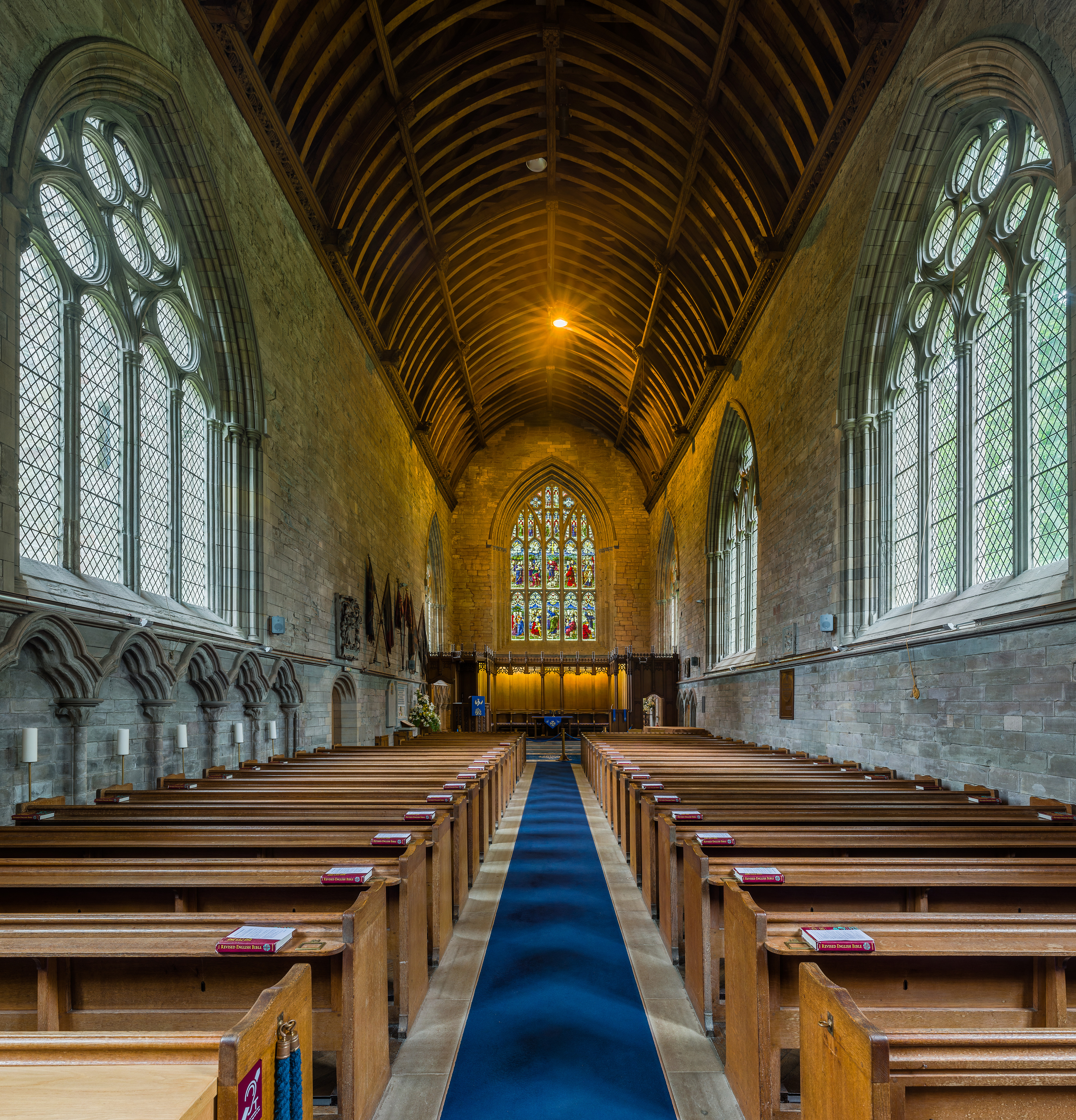
The cathedral's interior looking towards the altar

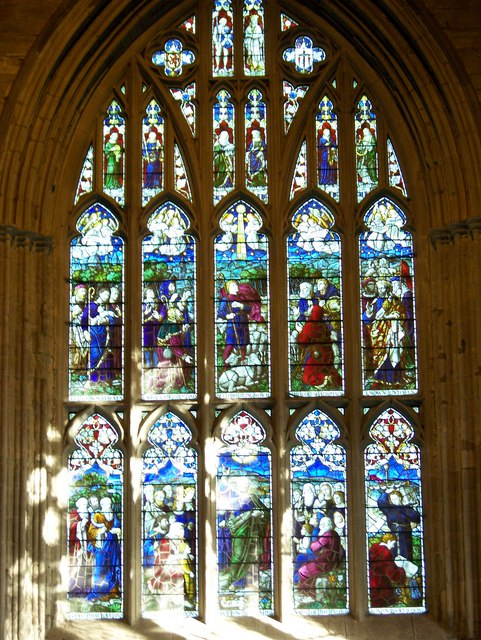
East window

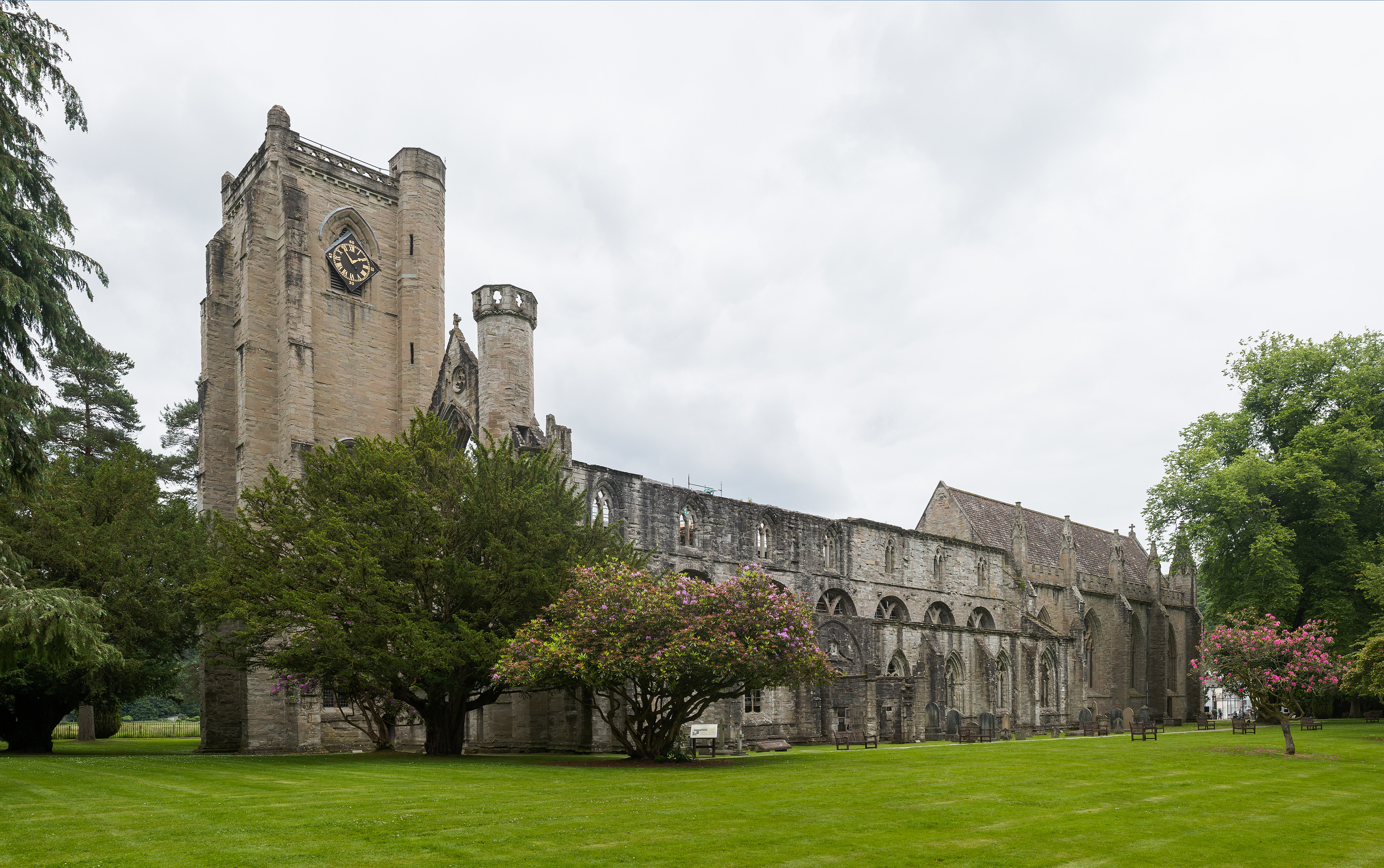
The ruins of the nave

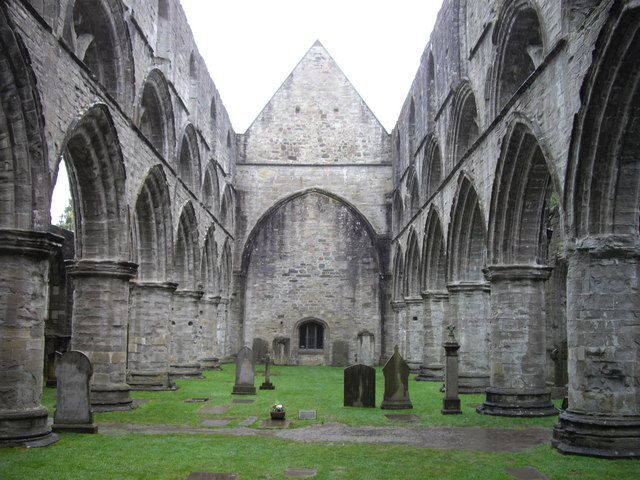
Nave interior

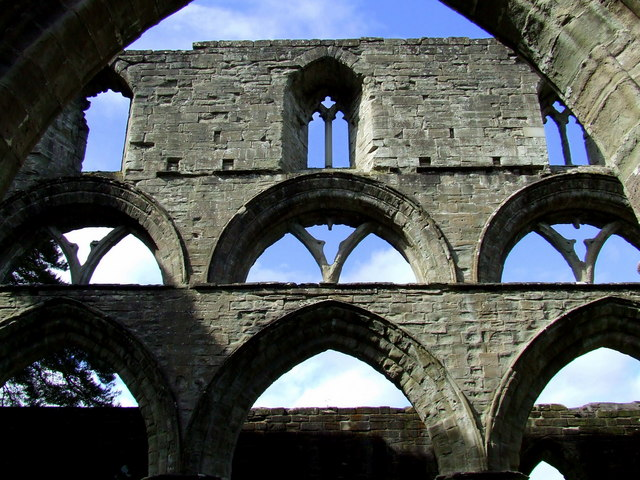
Arches in the nave

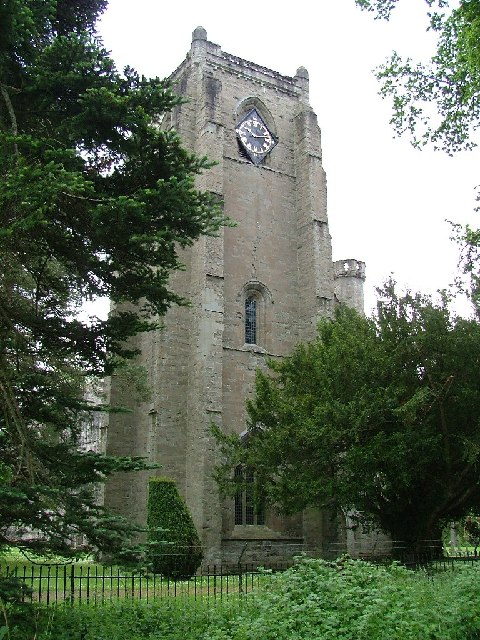
The Tower of Dunkeld Cathedral

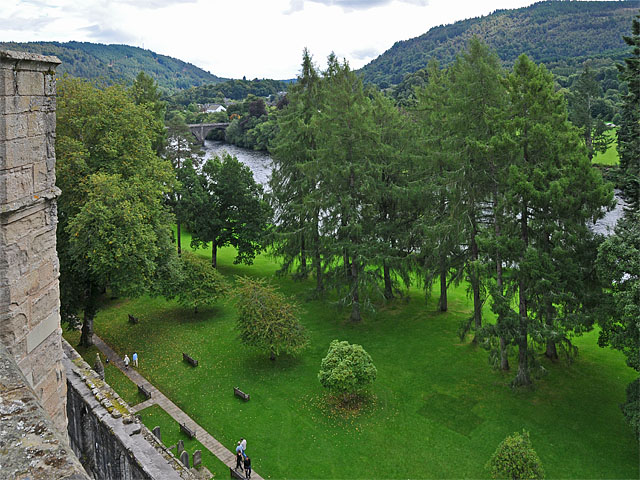
View from the tower

== See also ==
- Crínán of Dunkeld
- Bishop of Dunkeld
- List of Church of Scotland parishes
- List of cathedrals in Scotland
