= John Scotus (bishop of Dunkeld) =

Bishop of St Andrews and Dunkeld

John Scotus (Latin: Johannes cognomine Scotus, also referred to as John the Scot or l'Escot) was a 12th-century bishop of St. Andrews and Dunkeld.

John had studied at the University of Oxford and the University of Paris before beginning his ecclesiastical career at St. Andrews, entering the service of Bishop Richard. The latter made him Archdeacon of the see. His nickname would usually be taken to indicate that he was either a Gaelic-speaker or from Scotland-north-of-the-Forth (Scotia), but according to John of Fordun, he was from the villa of Podoth in Cheshire. He certainly had Scottish connections in his family. For instance, he was the nephew of both Robert of Scone, a previous bishop of Cell Rígmonaid, and Matthew, Bishop of Aberdeen.

After the death of his patron Richard, he was elected by the cathedral chapter in either 1177 or 1178 in the presence of Cardinal Vibiano of Santo Stefano al Monte Celio, the Papal legate. His election, however, was not approved of by the king, William I of Scotland, who wanted his chaplain Hugh to succeed to the bishopric. John travelled to appeal to Pope Alexander III, who quashed the case of Hugh and sent to Scotland a man named Alexius as legate. Alexius obtained entrance to William's kingdom, and consecrated John at Holyrood Abbey in the presence of four other Scottish bishops, in the year 1180. Nevertheless, the struggle continued, and in 1183, both John and Hugh resigned their rights.

John demanded another Scottish bishopric in compensation, as well as continued use of the revenues he had previously had access to. John was subsequently elected by the clergy of Dunkeld as bishop. The new Pope, Pope Lucius III, granted the see of St Andrew to Hugh, and John, having previously been elected to the Bishopric of Dunkeld, had this see confirmed. It did not, however, end the struggle, as King William still objected, and in 1186 both John and Hugh were summoned to Rome once more. Hugh refused to go, and was suspended and excommunicated by the Pope. In February 1188 John returned with a Letter of Confirmation of his position from Pope Clement III, and King William finally conceded that John could hold the see "of Dunkeld and the revenues which he had before his consecration", on the condition that John should quit-claim forever the episcopate of St. Andrews.

John subsequently reorganized the see of Dunkeld. His most notable act was dividing the see into two parts, and his actions thereby led to the creation of the Bishoric of Argyll.

John died in 1203 at Newbattle. He was buried in the choir on the north of the altar.

== Notes ==
Religious titles
Preceded by Richard	Bishop of Cell Rígmonaid (St Andrews); 1178/80–1183	Succeeded by Hugh
Preceded by Richard	Bishop of Dunkeld; 1183–1203	Succeeded by Richard de Prebenda
