= Diocese of Dunkeld =

Historical diocese of Scotland (c. 9th century-1689)

Coordinates: 56.565°N 3.585°W

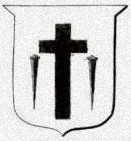
- Head: Bishop of Dunkeld
- Archdeacon(s): Archdeacon of Dunkeld
- Known rural deans: Angus (Rattray); Atholl; Drumalban; Fife & Fothriff; Lothian; Strathearn
- First attestation: 865 x 1114
- Metropolitan before 1472: None
- Metropolitan after 1492: Archbishop of Glasgow (until 1515); Archbishop of St Andrews (after 1515)
- Cathedral: Dunkeld Cathedral
- Dedication: Columba
- Canons: Secular
- Mensal churches: Abercorn, Aberdalgie, Aberlady, Alyth, Auchtergaven, Bunkle, Caputh, Cargill, Cramond, Dowally, Dunkeld, Forgandenny, Killespick-Kyril, Little Dunkeld, Obney, Pitcairn, Preston, Strathmiglo, Tibbermore
- Common churches: Auchterhouse, Fortingall, Meigle, Saline
- Prebendal churches: Aberlady, Alyth, Auchtergave, Clunie (Dean), Crieff, Dowally, Dunkeld (Treasurer), Fearn, Forgandenny, Inchaiden (Dean), Kinclaven (chanter), Lagganallachie (Archdeacon), Lethendy, (Chancellor), Little Dunkeld (Treasurer), Logiebride, Lumdeiff, Menmuir, Moneylie, Muckersie, Obney, Rattray (succentor), Tealing (Archdeacon)
- Catholic successor: Merged into resurrected Roman Catholic Diocese of Dunkeld, March 4, 1878
- Episcopal successor: Diocese of Saint Andrews, Dunkeld and Dunblane

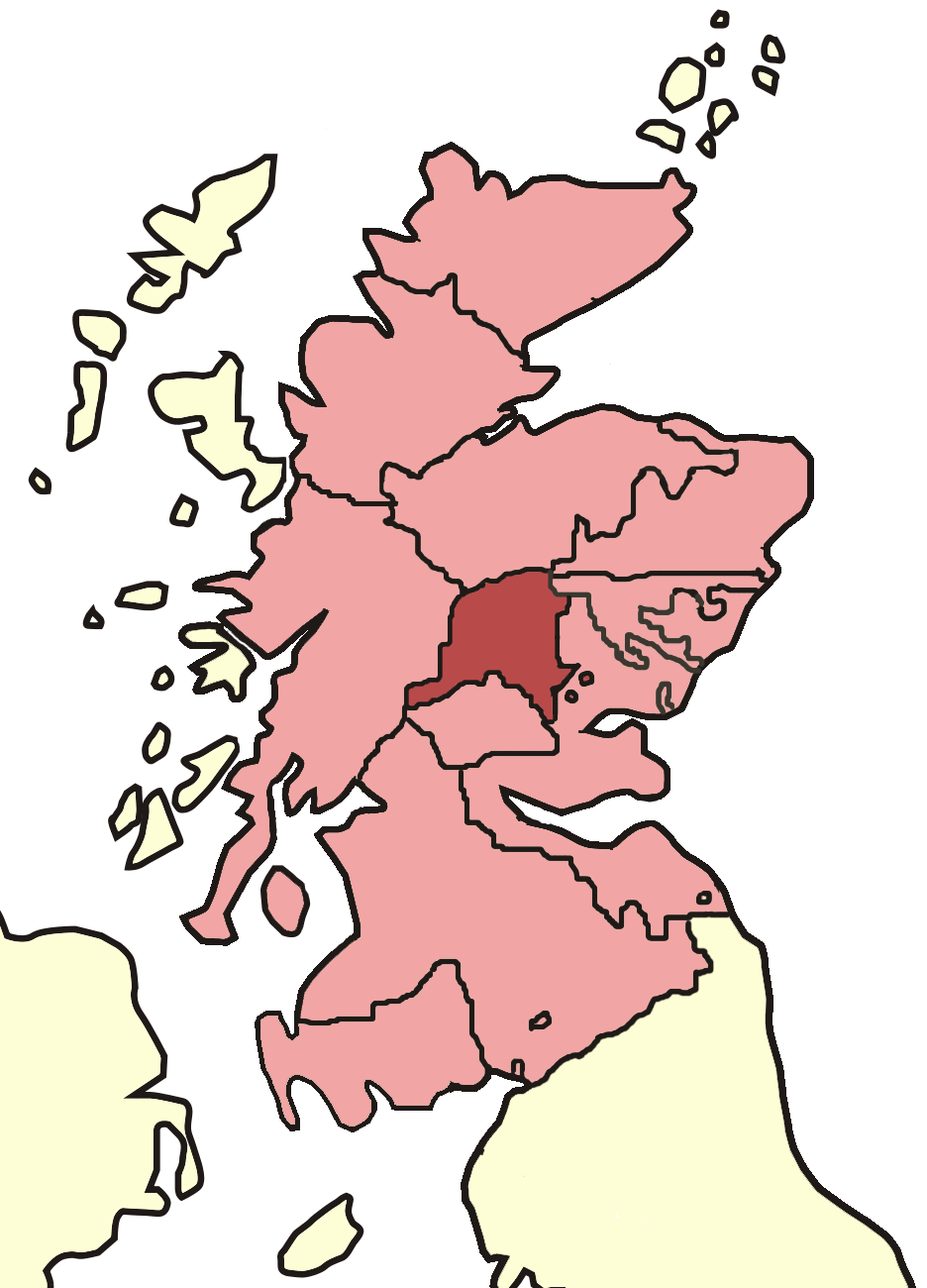
Skene's map of Scottish bishoprics in the reign of David I (reigned 1124–1153).

The Diocese of Dunkeld was one of the 13 historical dioceses of Scotland preceding the abolition of Episcopacy in 1689.

== History ==
It is thought that the diocese was constituted as far back as the middle of the ninth century. There was a monastery there by 849, when the relics of St. Columba were brought here from Iona. The first occupant was styled Bishop of Fortriu, the name by which the kingdom of the northern Picts was then known. This bishop was also styled Abbot of Dunkeld, perhaps holding jurisdiction, formerly enjoyed by Iona, over the other Columban monasteries in Scotland.

The new bishopric appears to have included a great part of what afterwards became the Diocese of Argyll, and retained its jurisdiction over various churches representing old Columban foundations. There were thirty-five bishops of Dunkeld from its foundation until the suppression of the Catholic hierarchy during the Protestant Reformation in the sixteenth century.

The Catholic cathedral, situated in the Perthshire town of Dunkeld, was erected between 1220 and 1500; after the Reformation the cathedral fell partly into ruins, although the choir is used for Presbyterian worship.

Despite the Reformation and the hostility of the new Church of Scotland to bishops, episcopacy was not finally abolished until 1689, although there had been a temporary abolition from 1638 until the beginning of the 1660s. The diocese was restored by the Catholic Church (with a different boundary), on 4 March 1878, by Pope Leo XIII. The new Roman Catholic Diocese of Dunkeld is one of the suffragan sees of the archiepiscopal province of St. Andrews and Edinburgh, and includes the counties of Perth, Angus, Clackmannan, Kinross, and the northern part of Fife. The diocesan cathedral, now dedicated to Saint Andrew rather than Columba, is located in Dundee. This is the residence of the great majority of the Catholics of the modern diocese. The cathedral chapter, erected in 1895, consists of a provost and eight canons.

== Parishes ==
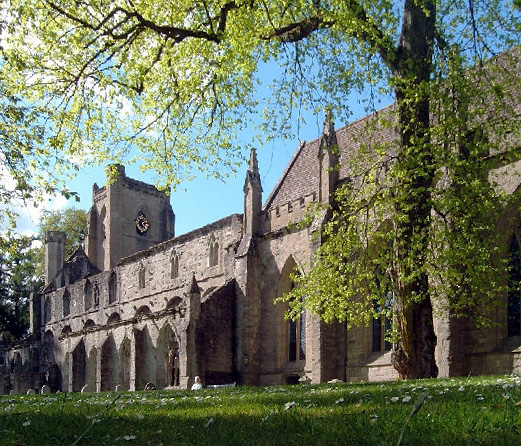
The partially ruined, partially restored Cathedral of St Columba at Dunkeld. It now operates as a Church of Scotland church.

=== Deanery/ies of Angus (or Rattray) ===
1. Abernyte
2. Auchterhouse
3. Fern
4. Menmuir
5. Tealing

=== Deanery of Atholl and Drumalban ===
1. Alyth
2. Ardeonaig
3. Auchtergaven
4. Bendochy
5. Blair (now Blair Atholl)
6. Cargill
7. Clunie
8. Dull
9. Dunkeld Cathedral
10. Fortingall
11. Dunkeld, Holy Trinity
12. Inchcadin (now Kenmore)
13. Killin
14. Kilmaveonaig
15. Kinclaven
16. Lethendy
17. Little Dunkeld
18. Logie Allochie (now Lagganallachy)
19. Logiebride
20. Logierait
21. Lude
22. Lundeiff (now Kinloch)
23. Meigle
24. Melginch (now St. Martins)
25. Moneydie
26. Moulin
27. Rannoch (or Killichonen)
28. Rattray
29. Redgorton
30. Ruthven
31. Strathardle (now or Kirkmichael)
32. Struan
33. Weem

=== Deanery of Fife and Fothriff ===
1. Aberdour
2. Auchtertool
3. Crombie
4. Dalgety
5. Fithkil (now Leslie)
6. Rosyth
7. Saline
8. Strathmiglo

=== Deanery of Lothian ===
1. Abercorn
2. Aberlady
3. Bunkle
4. Cramond
5. Preston

=== Deanery of Strathearn ===
1. Aberdalgie
2. Alva
3. Crieff
4. Dollar
5. Forgrund (or Forgandenny)
6. Lecropt
7. Madderty
8. Muckersie
9. Tibbermore

== See also ==
- Bishop of Dunkeld, the historical bishop.
- Bishop of Dunkeld (Roman Catholic), the restored Roman Catholic Bishop.
- Roman Catholic Diocese of Dunkeld, the restored Roman Catholic Diocese.
- Bishop of Saint Andrews, Dunkeld and Dunblane, the Scottish Episcopal Bishop.
- Diocese of Saint Andrews, Dunkeld and Dunblane, the Scottish Episcopal Diocese.

== Bibliography ==
- Cowan, Ian B., The Parishes of Medieval Scotland, Scottish Record Society, Vol. 93, (Edinburgh, 1967)
- Watt, D.E.R., Fasti Ecclesiae Scotinanae Medii Aevi ad annum 1638, 2nd Draft, (St Andrews, 1969), pp. 138–9
