= Dovecote =

Structure intended to house pigeons or doves

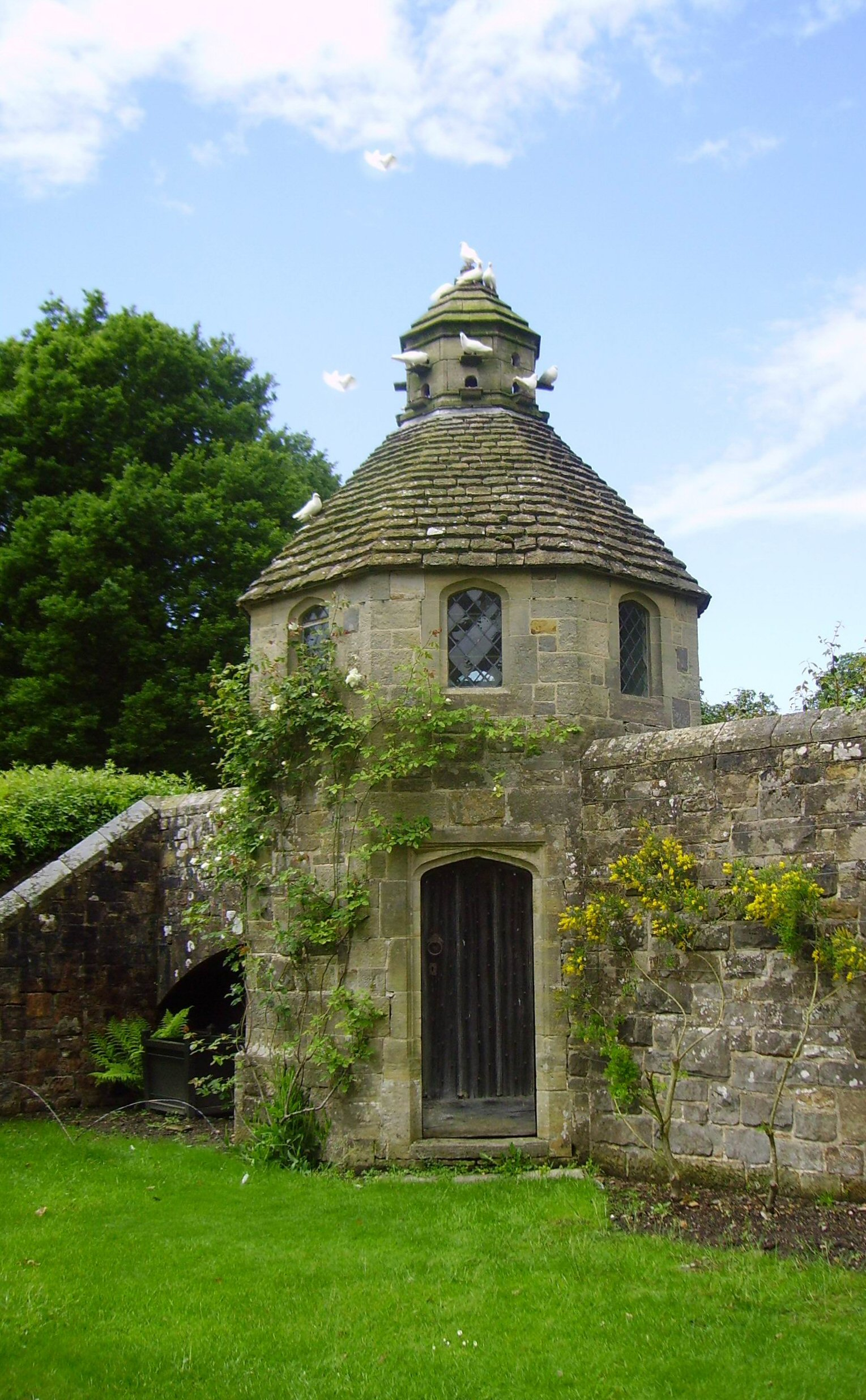
Dovecote at Nymans Gardens, West Sussex, England

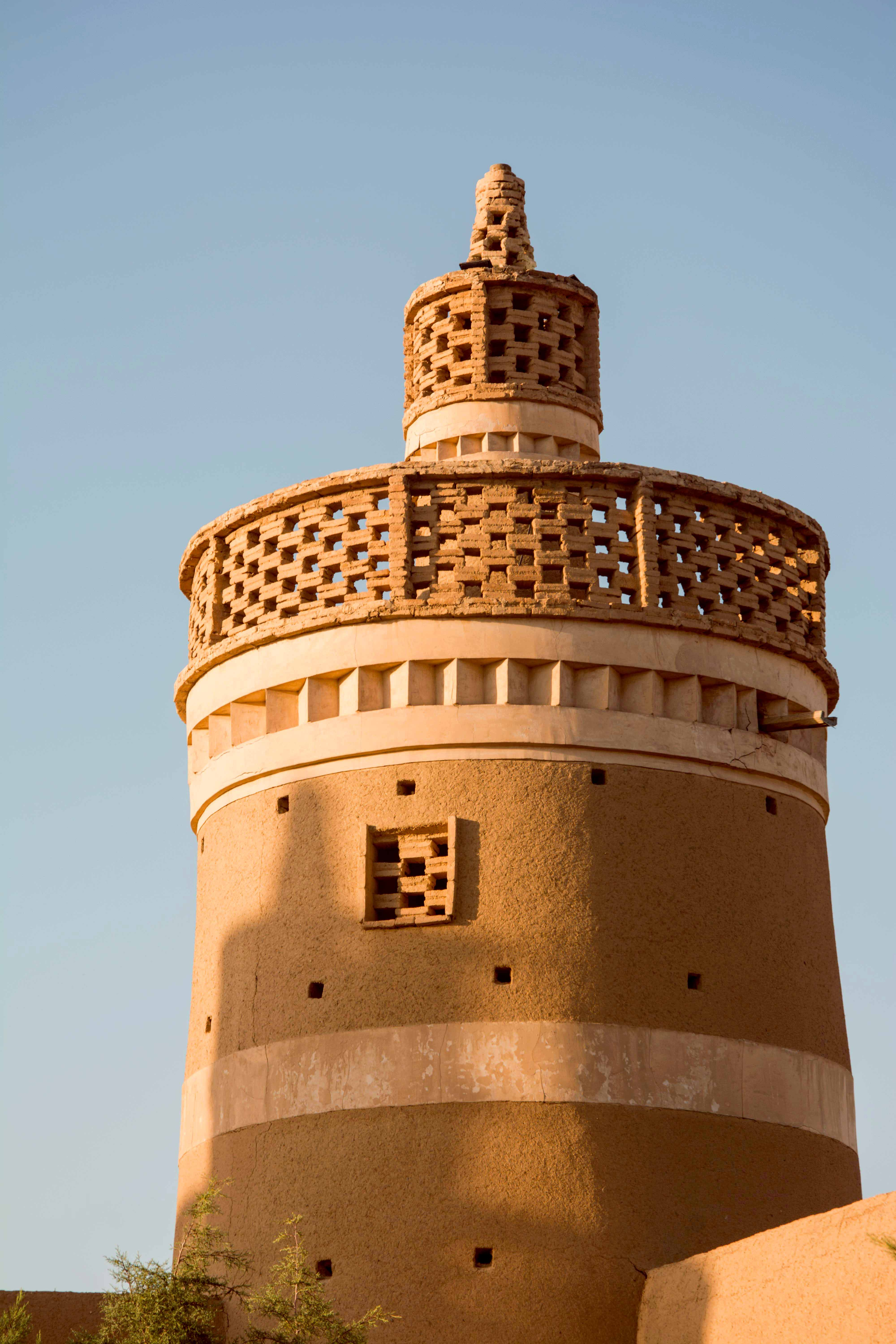
A dovecote in Najafabad, Iran

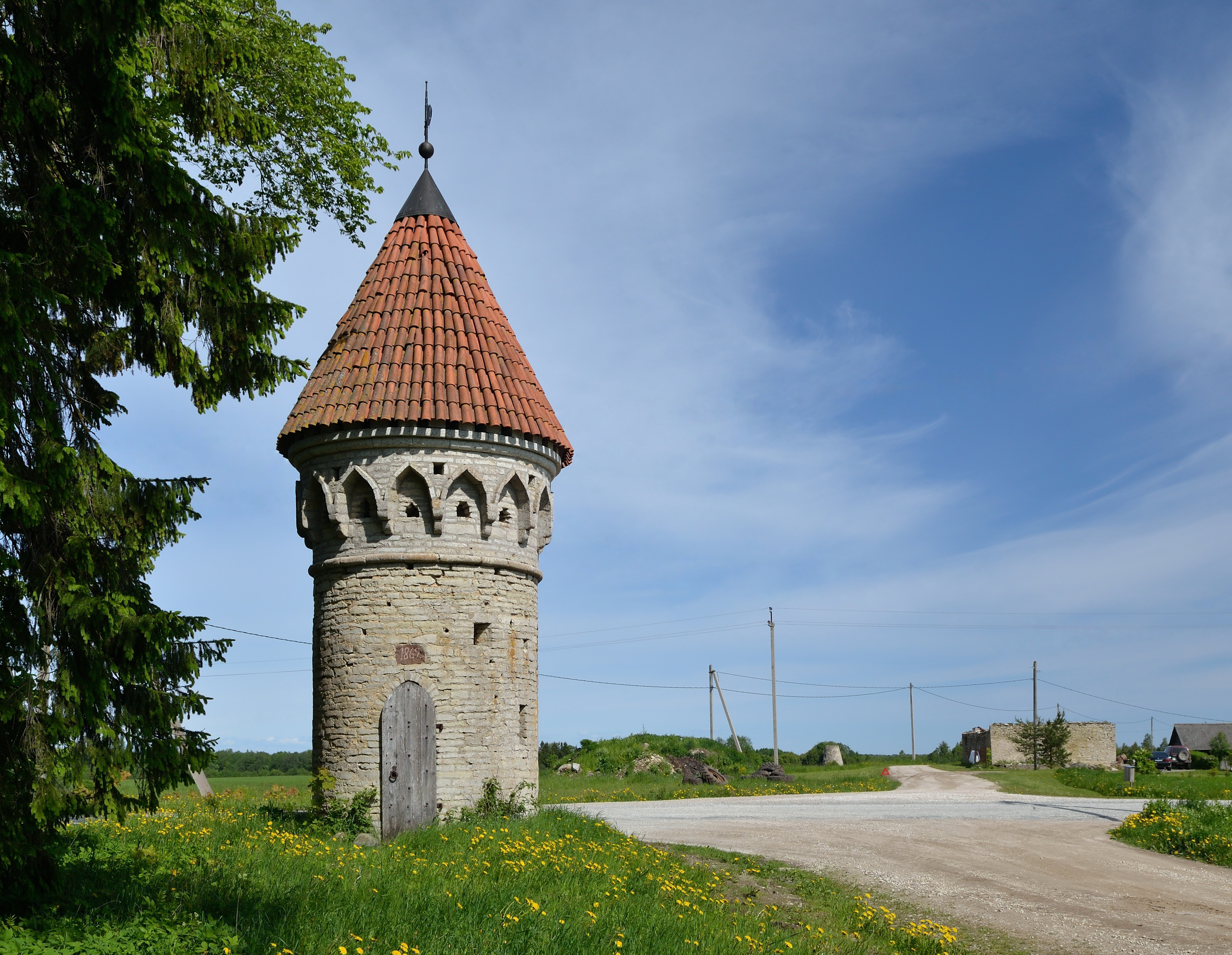
Pigeon tower in Kavastu, Estonia (built 1869)

A dovecote or dovecot /ˈdʌvkɒt/, doocot (Scots) or columbarium is a structure intended to house pigeons or doves. Dovecotes may be free-standing structures in a variety of shapes, or built into the end of a house or barn. They generally contain pigeonholes for the birds to nest. Pigeons and doves were an important food source historically in the Middle East and Europe and were kept for their eggs and dung.

== History and geography ==
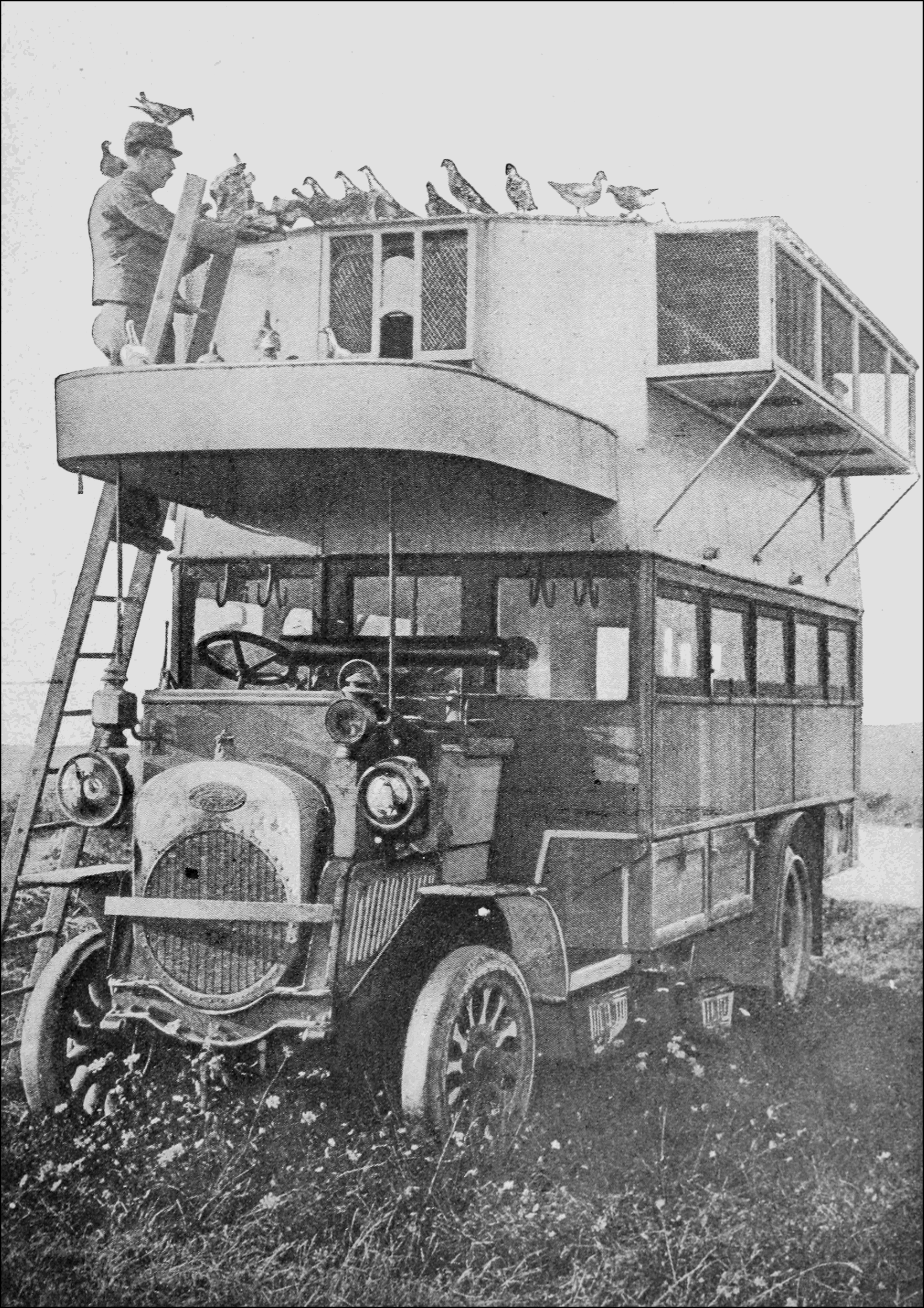
Motorized dovecote for homing pigeons in World War I

A dovecote in Ambodifomby, Madagascar, 1911–1912

The oldest dovecotes are thought to have been the fortress-like dovecotes of Upper Egypt and the domed dovecotes of Iran. In these regions the droppings were used by farmers for fertilization. Pigeon droppings were also used for leather tanning and making gunpowder.

In some cultures, particularly Medieval Europe, the possession of a dovecote was a symbol of status and power and was consequently regulated by law. Only nobles had this special privilege, known as droit de colombier.

Many ancient manors in France and the United Kingdom have a dovecote still standing (or in ruins) in a section of the manorial enclosure, or in nearby fields. Examples include Château de Kerjean in Brittany, France, Houchin, France, Bodysgallen Hall in Wales, and Muchalls Castle and Newark Castle in Scotland.

=== Middle East ===
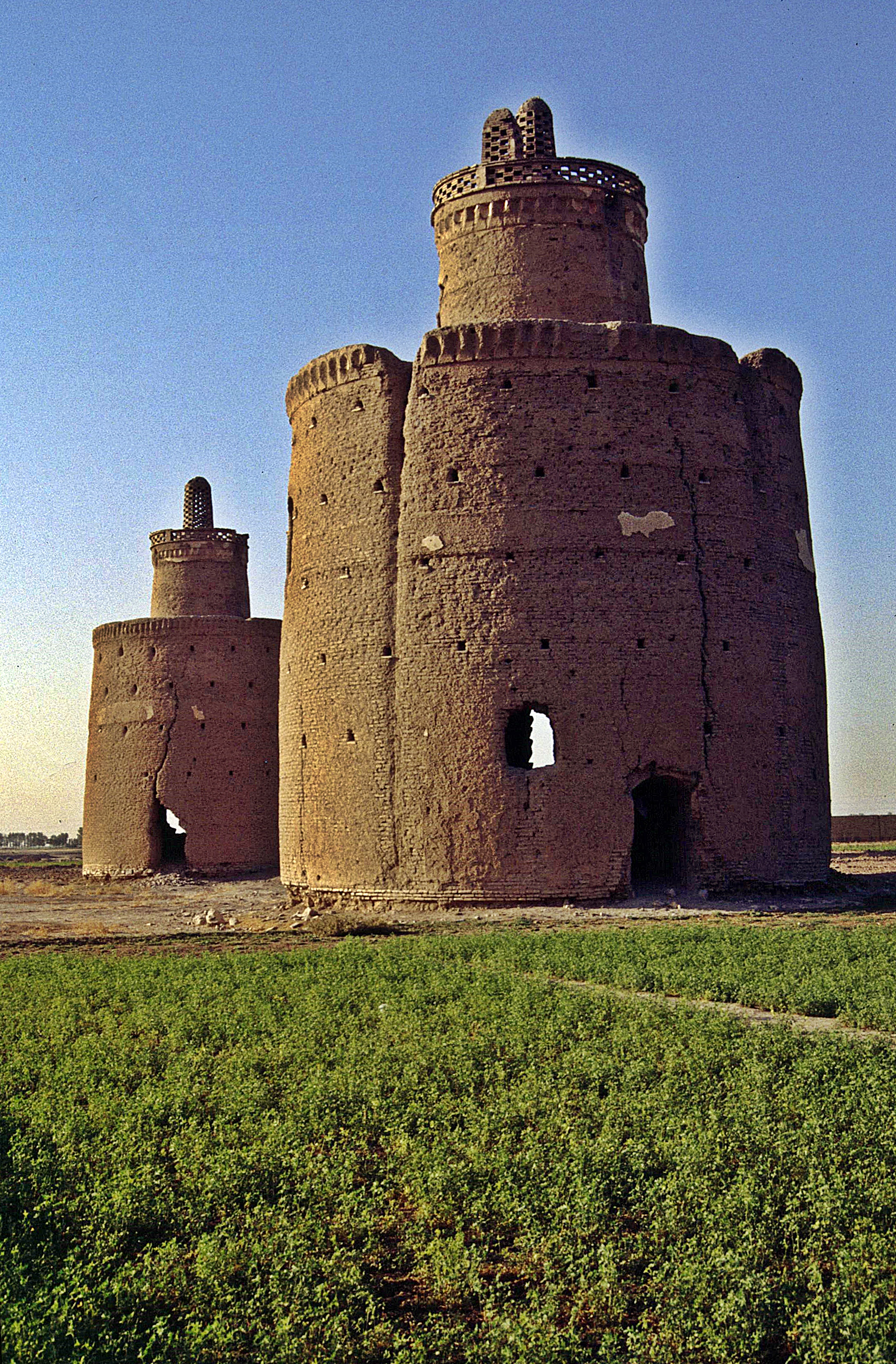
Pigeon houses in Isfahan, Iran

Dotted with wooden pegs and hundreds of holes, the towers provided shelter and breeding areas for the birds to nest and raise their young in a mostly harsh desert environment. In Saudi Arabia, fourteen towers were spotted in 2020 and were the oldest seen in the Middle Eastern country. They have often been spotted in Iran, Egypt, and Qatar, where they have a lengthy history dating back to the 13th century. Dovecotes are also prevalent in ancient Iran and Anatolia. Pigeons were found in human settlements in Egypt and the Middle East since the dawn of agriculture, probably attracted to seeds people planted for their crops.

==== Iran ====
In the 17th century, a European traveller counted up to 3000 dovecotes in the Isfahan area of Persia (Hadizadeh, 2006, 51–4). Today, over 300 historic dovecotes have been identified in Isfahan Province and a total of 65 have been registered on the National Heritage List (Rafiei, 1974, 118–24). Dovecotes were constructed to produce large quantities of high-quality organic fertilizer for Isfahan's rich market gardens. The largest dovecotes could house 14,000 birds, and were decorated in distinctive red bands so as to be easily recognizable to the pigeons.

==== Cappadocia ====
The dovecotes in Cappadocia are mostly designed like rooms which are set up by carving the rocks. The oldest examples of these cotes in the region were built in the 18th century but they are few. Most of the cotes in the region were built in the 19th and early 20th century (øúçen, 2008). It is significantly evident that the cotes were constructed near water sources, on a place, above the valley and their entrance, called as mouth of the cotes were mostly built in the east or south direction of valleys. By this way of construction, it was proposed to protect the cotes from cold and get sunlight inside. The cotes were generally constructed by carving the rocks as a room.

=== Columbaria in ancient Rome ===
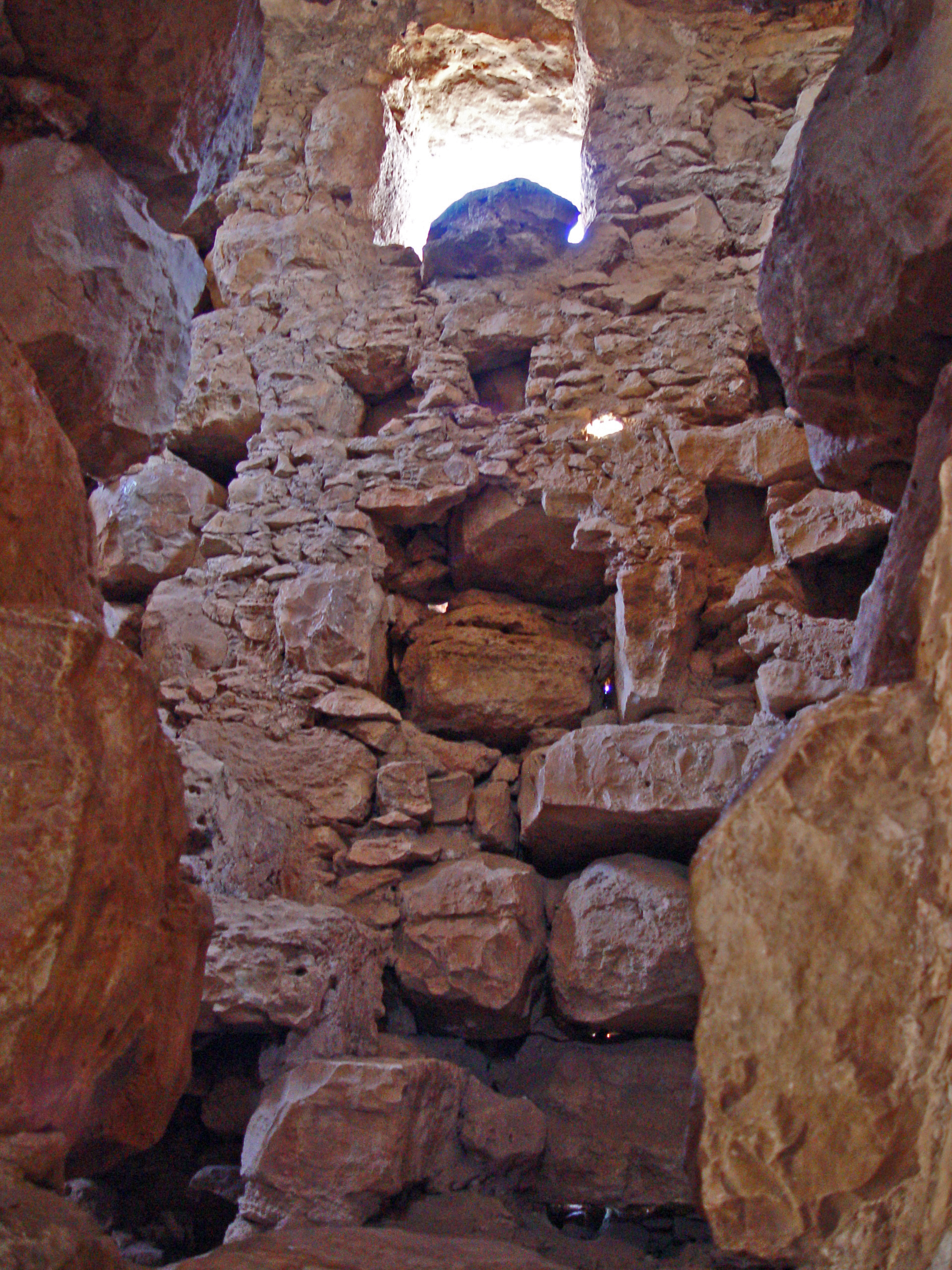
A columbarium for cremation remains in a 3rd century Roman mausoleum in Mazor (Israel)

The presence of dovecotes is not documented in France before the Roman invasion of Gaul by Caesar. Pigeon keeping was then a passion in Rome: the Roman-style, generally round, columbarium had its interior covered with a white coating of marble powder. Varro, Columella, and Pliny, all wrote about pigeon keeping and dovecote construction.

In the city of Rome in the time of the Republic and the Empire the internal design of the banks of pigeonholes was adapted for the purpose of disposing of cremated ashes after death: These columbaria were generally constructed underground.

=== France ===
The French word for dovecote is pigeonnier or colombier. In some French provinces, especially Normandy, the dovecotes were built of wood in a very stylized way. Stone was the other popular building material for these old dovecotes. These stone structures were usually built in circular, square and occasionally octagonal form. Some of the medieval French abbeys had very large stone dovecotes on their grounds.

In Brittany, the dovecote was sometimes built directly into the upper walls of the farmhouse or manor-house. In rare cases, it was built into the upper gallery of the lookout tower (for example at the Toul-an-Gollet manor in Plesidy, Brittany). Dovecotes of this type are called tour-fuie in French.

Even some of the larger château-forts, such as the Château de Suscinio in Morbihan, still have a complete dovecote standing on the grounds, outside the moat and walls of the castle.

==== Colombiers and pigeonniers ====
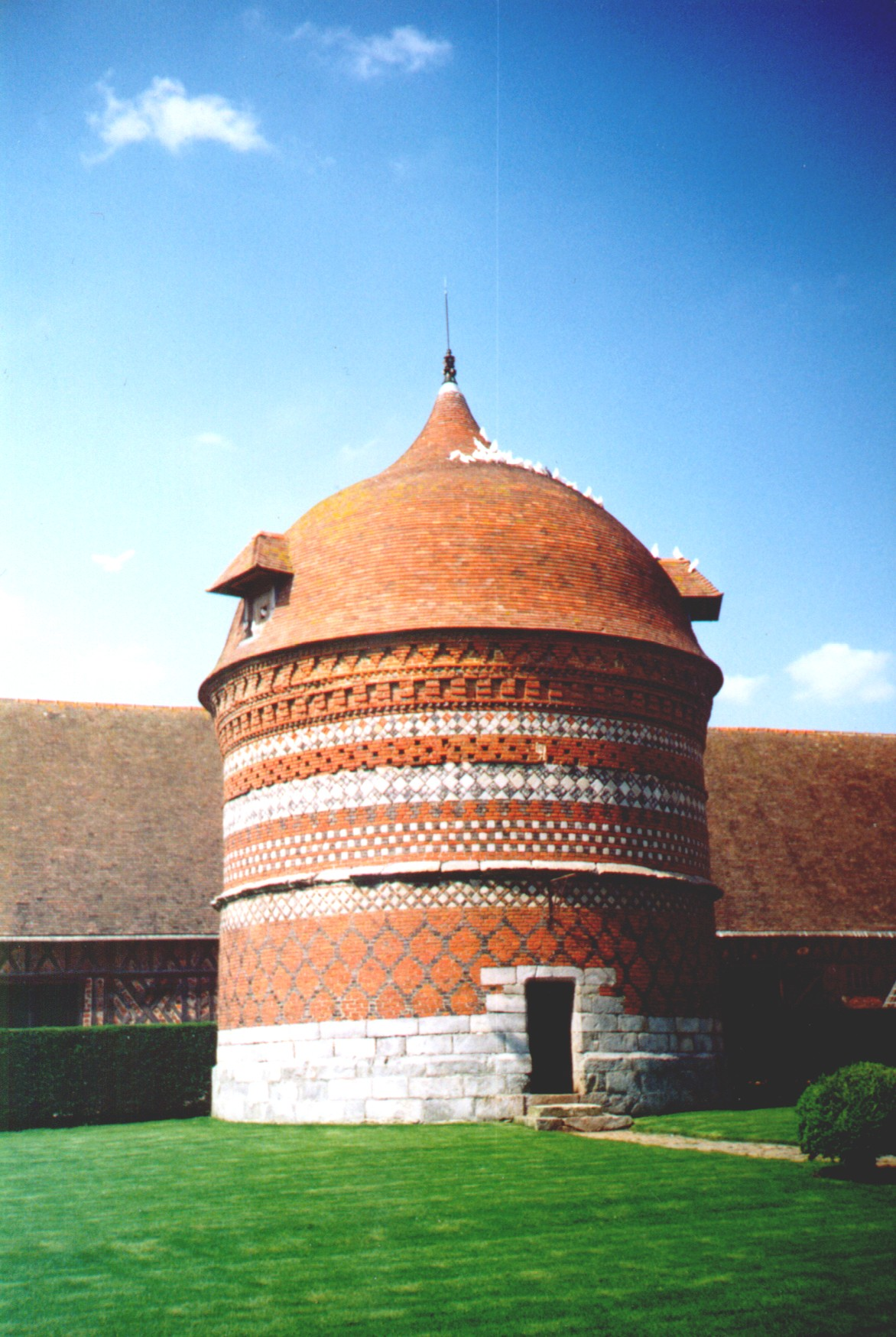
Colombier at Manoir d'Ango near Dieppe

In France, it was called a colombier, fuie or pigeonnier. With its extensive cultivation of grain, the favourite food of pigeons, France had 42,000 pigeonniers by the 17th century, especially in Normandy and the Midi.

The dovecote interior, the space granted to the pigeons, is divided into a number of boulins (pigeon holes). Each boulin is the lodging of a pair of pigeons. These boulins can be in rock, brick or cob (adobe) and installed at the time of the construction of the dovecote or be in pottery (jars lying sideways, flat tiles, etc.), in braided wicker in the form of a basket or of a nest. It is the number of boulins that indicates the capacity of the dovecote. The ones at the chateau d'Aulnay in Aulnay-sous-Bois and the one at Château de Panloy in Port-d'Envaux are among the largest in France.

In the Middle Ages, particularly in France, the possession of a colombier à pied (dovecote on the ground accessible by foot), constructed separately from the corps de logis of the manor-house (having boulins from the top down), was a privilege of the seigneurial lord. He was granted permission by his overlord to build a dovecote or two on his estate lands. For the other constructions, the dovecote rights (droit de colombier) varied according to the provinces. They had to be in proportion to the importance of the property, placed in a floor above a henhouse, a kennel, a bread oven, even a wine cellar. Generally, the aviaries were integrated into a stable, a barn or a shed, and were permitted to use no more than 1 hectare (2 1/2 acres) of arable land.

=== Greece ===
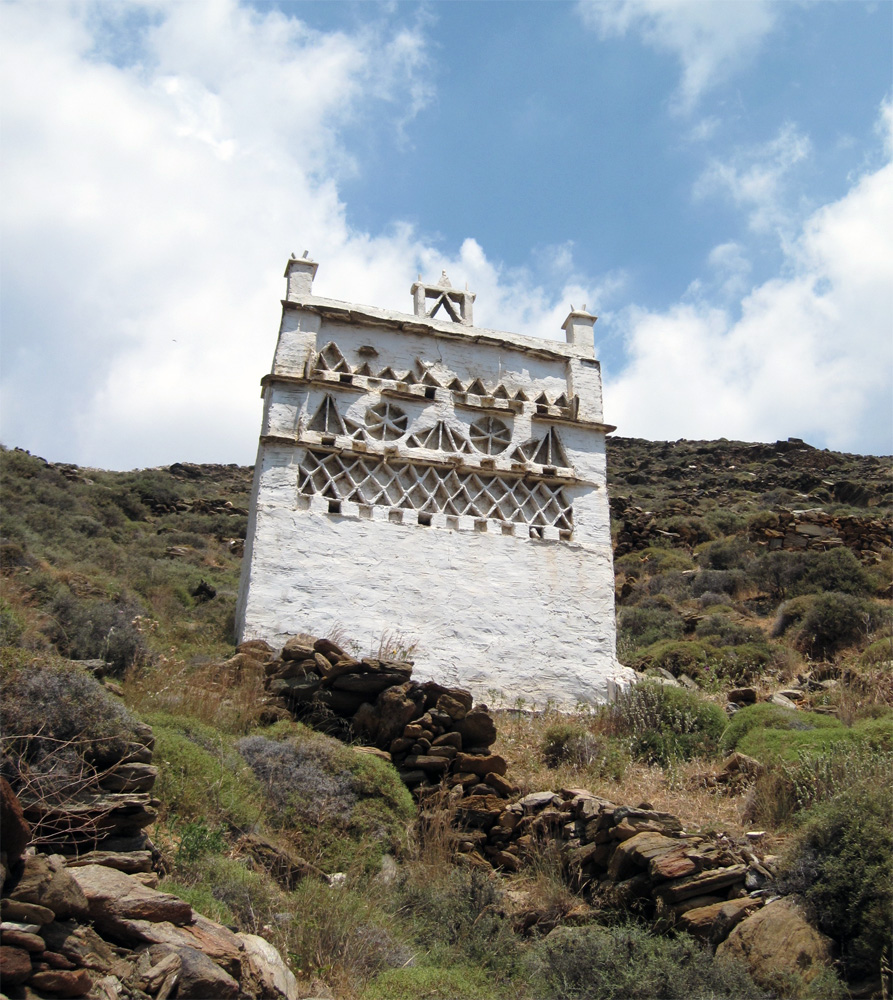
Traditional peristeronas in Tinos, Greece

Dovecotes in Greece are known as Περιστεριώνες, Peristeriones (plural). Such structures are very popular in the Cycladic islands and in particular Tinos, which has 1300 dovecotes. The systematic breeding of doves and pigeons as sources of meat and fertilizer was introduced by the Venetians in the 15th century. Dovecotes are built in slopes protected by the prevailing north wind and oriented so that their facade is towards an open space.

=== Ireland ===
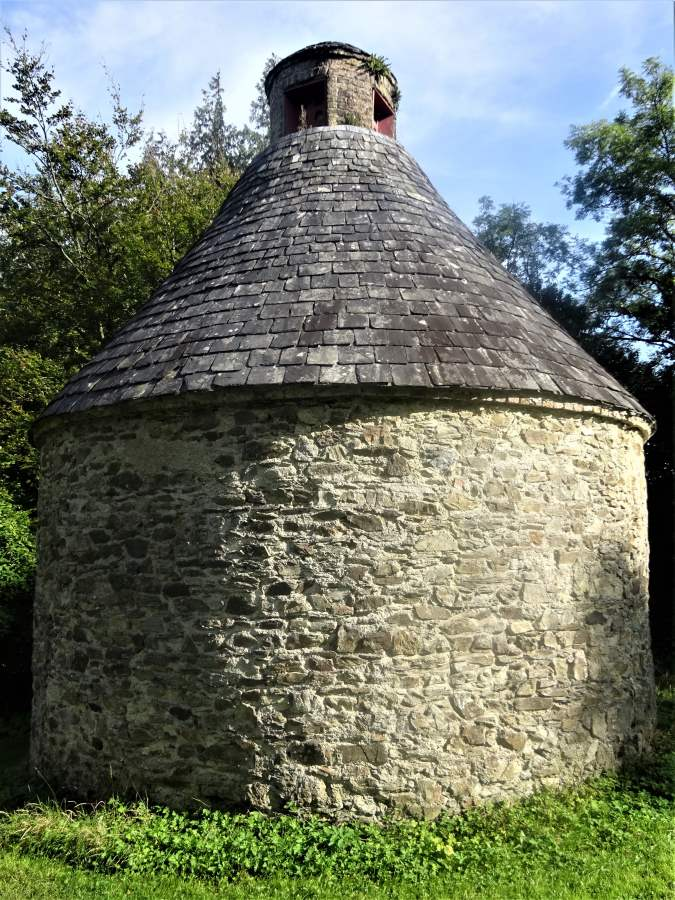
Dovecote in the grounds of Woodstock, County Kilkenny

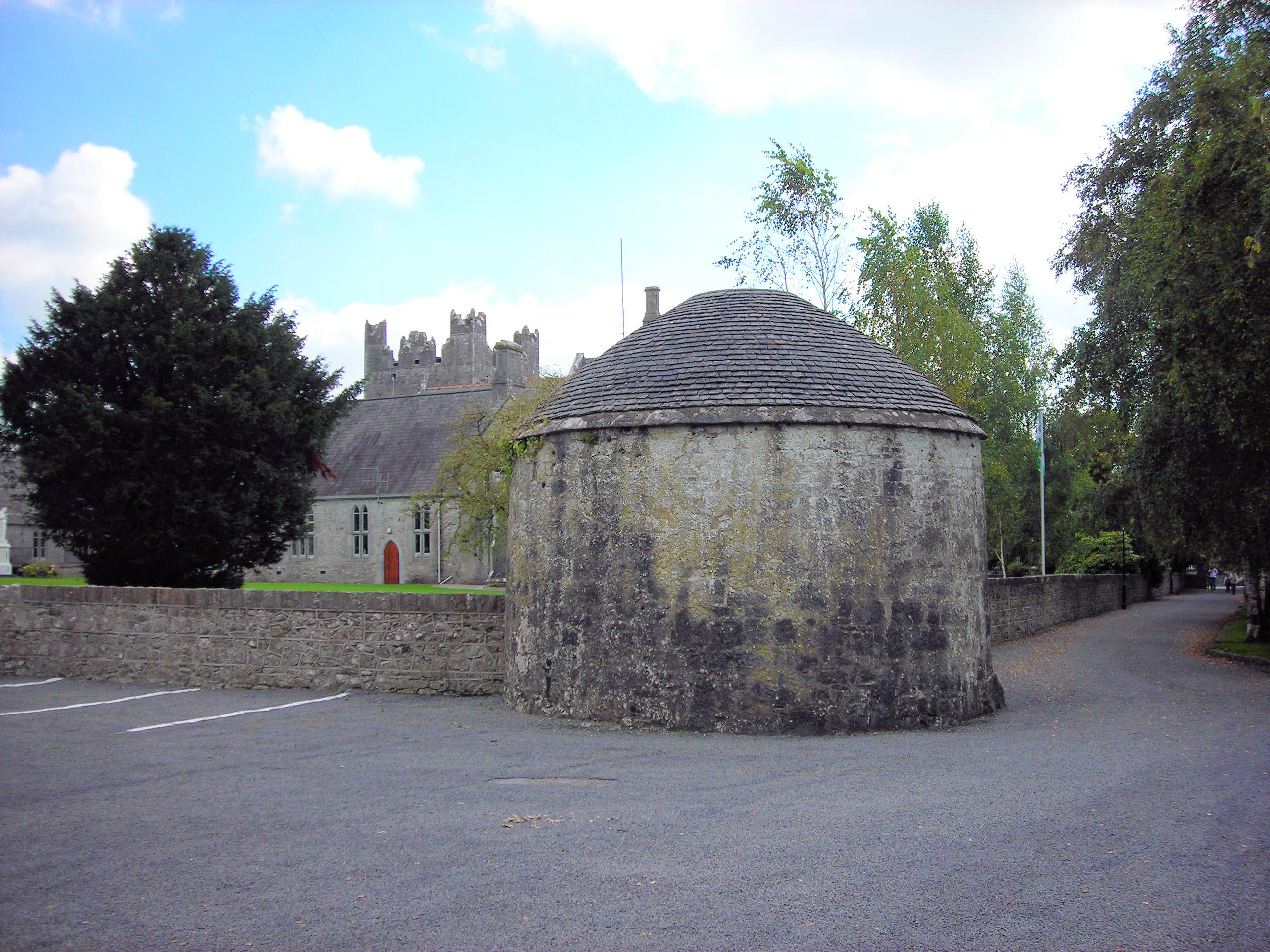
Dovecote in Adare

Stone dovecotes were built in Ireland from the Norman period onward, to supply meat to monastic kitchens and to large country houses. A traditional dovecote was a multistorey building with inner walls lined with alcoves or ledges to mimic a cave. They survive in many parts of Ireland, with notable examples at Ballybeg Priory, Oughterard, Cahir, Woodstock Estate, Mosstown, and Adare. Three Irish Cistercian houses held dovecotes: Glencairn, Mellifont and Kilcooley.

=== Italy ===
Dovecotes were included in several of the villa designs of Andrea Palladio. As an integral part of the World Heritage Site "Vicenza and the Palladian Villas of the Veneto", dovecotes such as those at Villa Barbaro enjoy a high level of protection.

=== Netherlands and Belgium ===
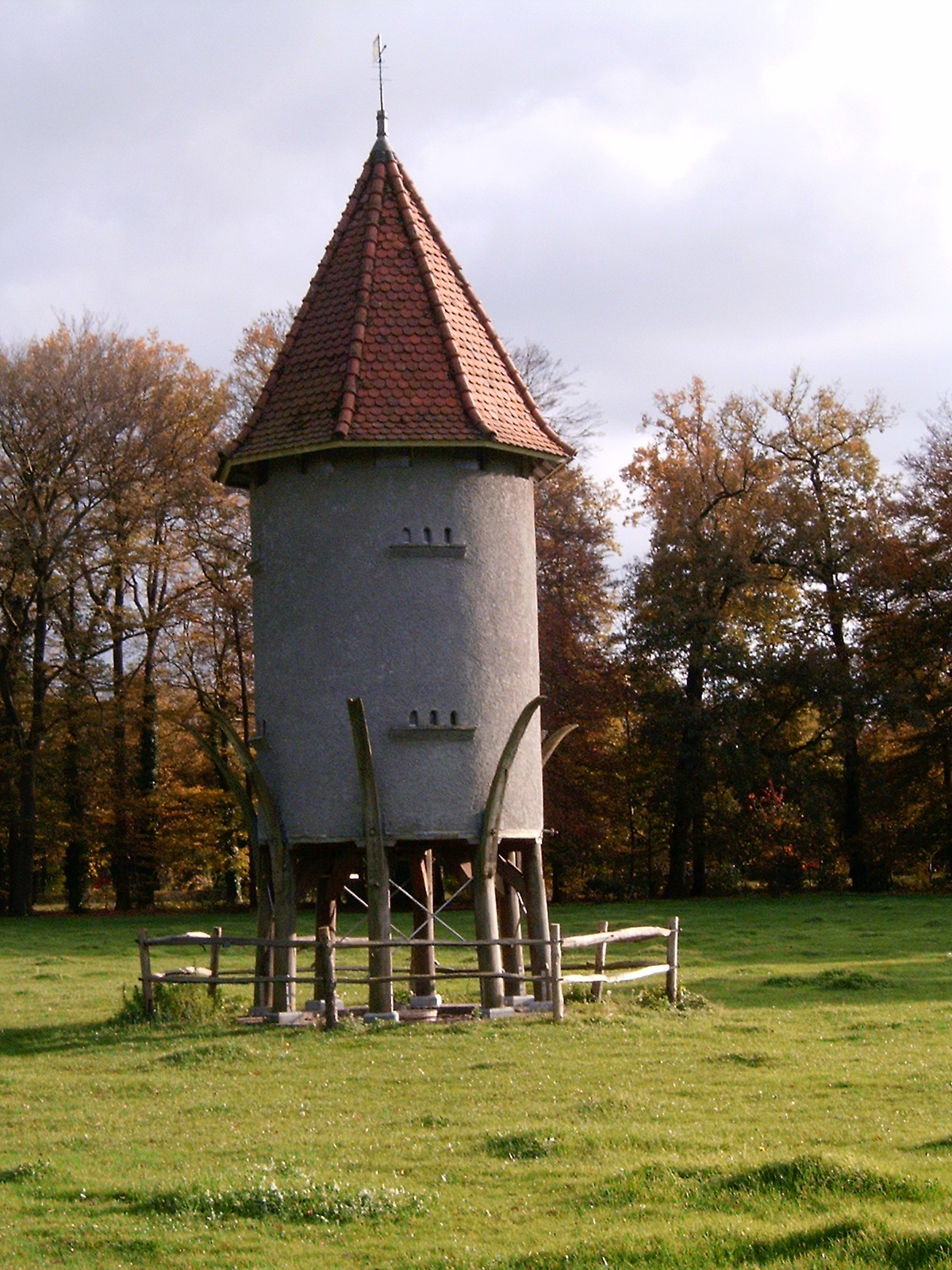
An old dovecote in Doorn, Netherlands

Dovecotes in Belgium are mostly associated with pigeon racing. They have special features, such as trap doors that allow pigeons to fly in, but not out. The Flemish word for dovecote is duivenkot. The Dutch word for dovecote is duiventoren, or duiventil for a smaller dovecot.

=== Spain ===
Dovecotes in Spain are known as a Palomar or Palomares (plural). These structures are very popular in the Tierra de Campos region and also has a scale model of this type of building at a theme park located in the Mudéjar de Olmedo. Other good examples are located at Museums located in Castroverde de Campos, (Zamora Province), Villafáfila, (Zamora Province), Santoyo, (Palencia Province) and the famous "Palomar de la Huerta Noble" in the municipality of Isla Cristina (Huelva Province) which was built in the 18th century to house 36,000 pigeons.

=== Transylvania ===
The Szekely people of Transylvania incorporate a dovecote into the design of their famous gates. These intricately carved wooden structures feature a large arch with a slatted door, which is meant to admit drivers of carriages and wagons (although today the visitors are probably driving cars and trucks), and a smaller arch with a similar door for pedestrians. Across the top of the gate is a dovecote with 6–12 or more pigeonholes and a roof of wooden shingles or tiles.

=== England and Wales ===
The Romans may have introduced dovecotes or columbaria to Britain since pigeon holes have been found in Roman ruins at Caerwent. However, it is believed that doves were not commonly kept there until after the Norman Conquest. The earliest known examples of dove-keeping occur in Norman castles of the 12th century (for example, at Rochester Castle, Kent, where nest-holes can be seen in the keep), and documentary references also begin in the 12th century. The earliest surviving, definitely dated free-standing dovecote in England was built in 1326 at Garway in Herefordshire. The Welsh name colomendy has itself become a place name (similarly in Cornwall: colomen, and ty = dove house). One medieval dovecote still remains standing on the site of a hall at Potters Marston in Leicestershire, a hamlet near to the village of Stoney Stanton.

=== Scotland ===
Scotland has a sizeable number of doocots, particularly concentrated on the east of the country in Fife and East Lothian where the richer arable fields provided grain for food. A gazetteer in Buxbaum lists 108 doocots as of 1987. Early purpose-built doocots in Scotland are often of a "beehive" shape, circular in plan and tapering up to a domed roof with a circular opening at the top. These are also found in the North of England and are sometimes referred to as "tun-bellied". In the late 16th century, they were superseded by the "lectern" type, rectangular with a mono-pitched roof sloping fairly steeply in a suitable direction. Phantassie Doocot is an unusual example of the beehive type topped with a mono-pitched roof, and Finavon Doocot of the lectern type is the largest doocot in Scotland, with 2,400 nesting boxes. Doocots were built well into the 18th century in increasingly decorative forms, then the need for them died out though some continued to be incorporated into farm buildings as ornamental features. However, the 20th century saw a revival of doocot construction by pigeon fanciers, and dramatic towers clad in black or green painted corrugated iron can still be found on wasteland near housing estates in Glasgow and Edinburgh.

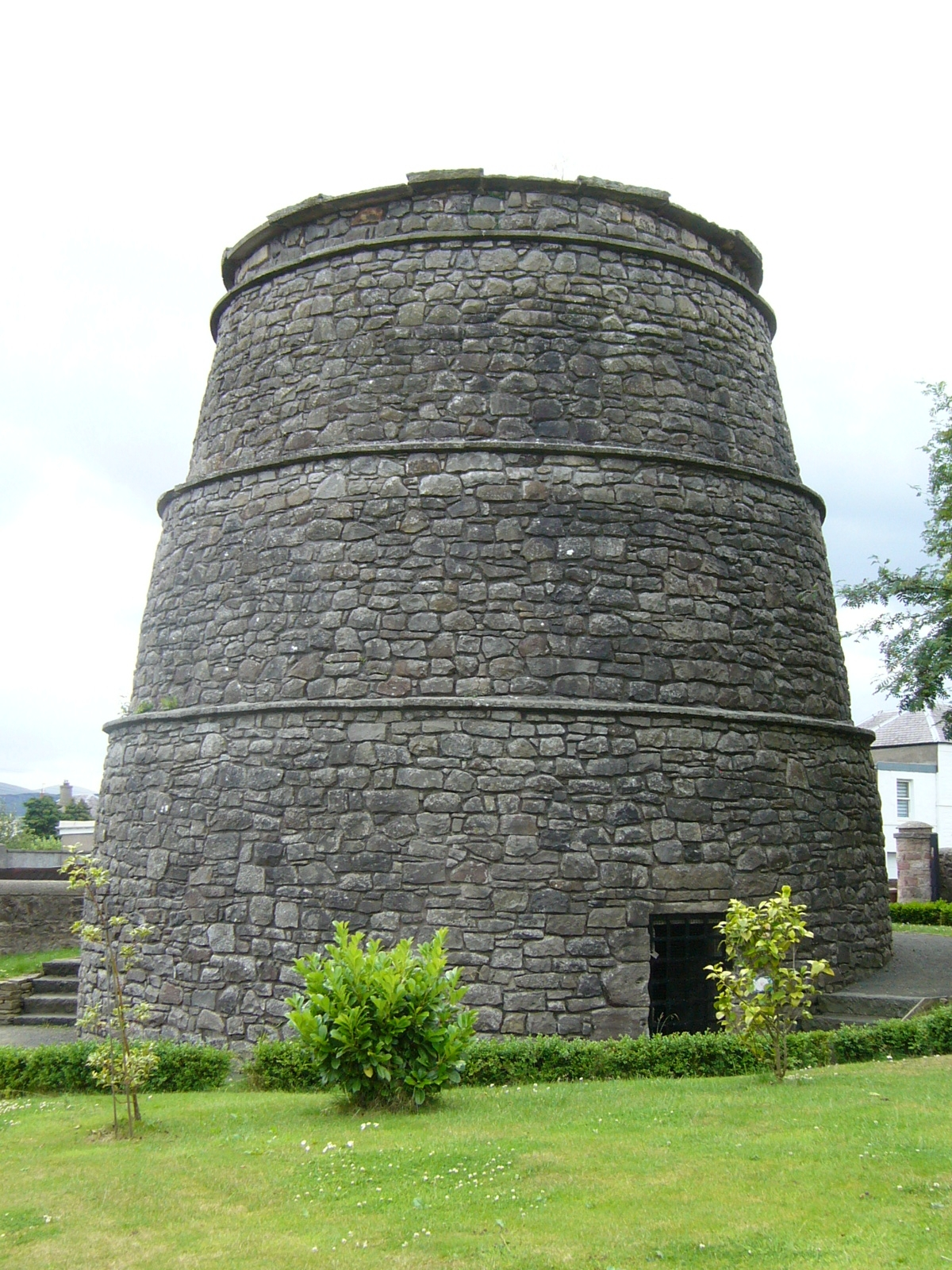
A castle doocot at Corstorphine, Edinburgh (16th century)

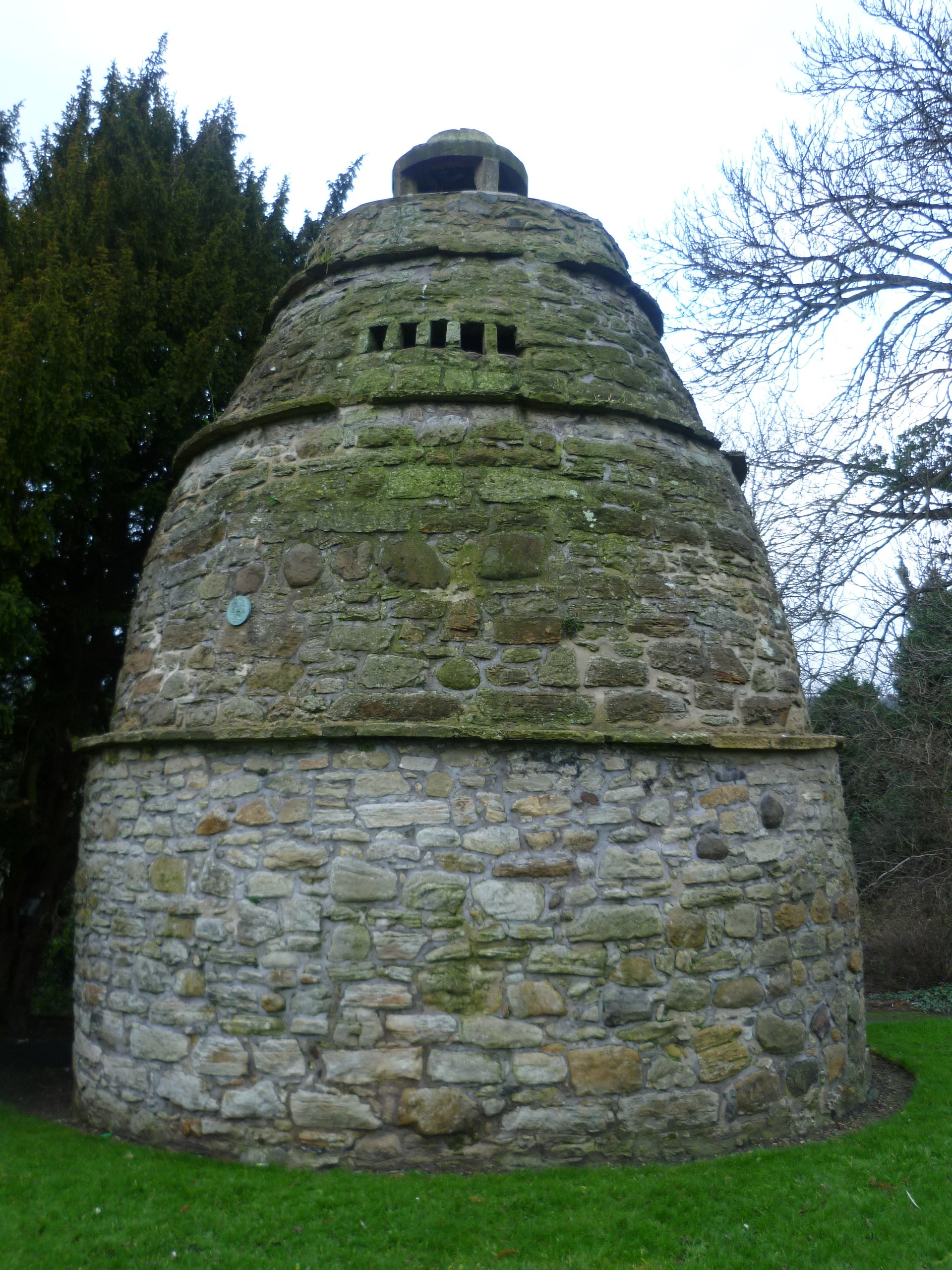
Beehive-shaped doocot, Linlithgow, Scotland

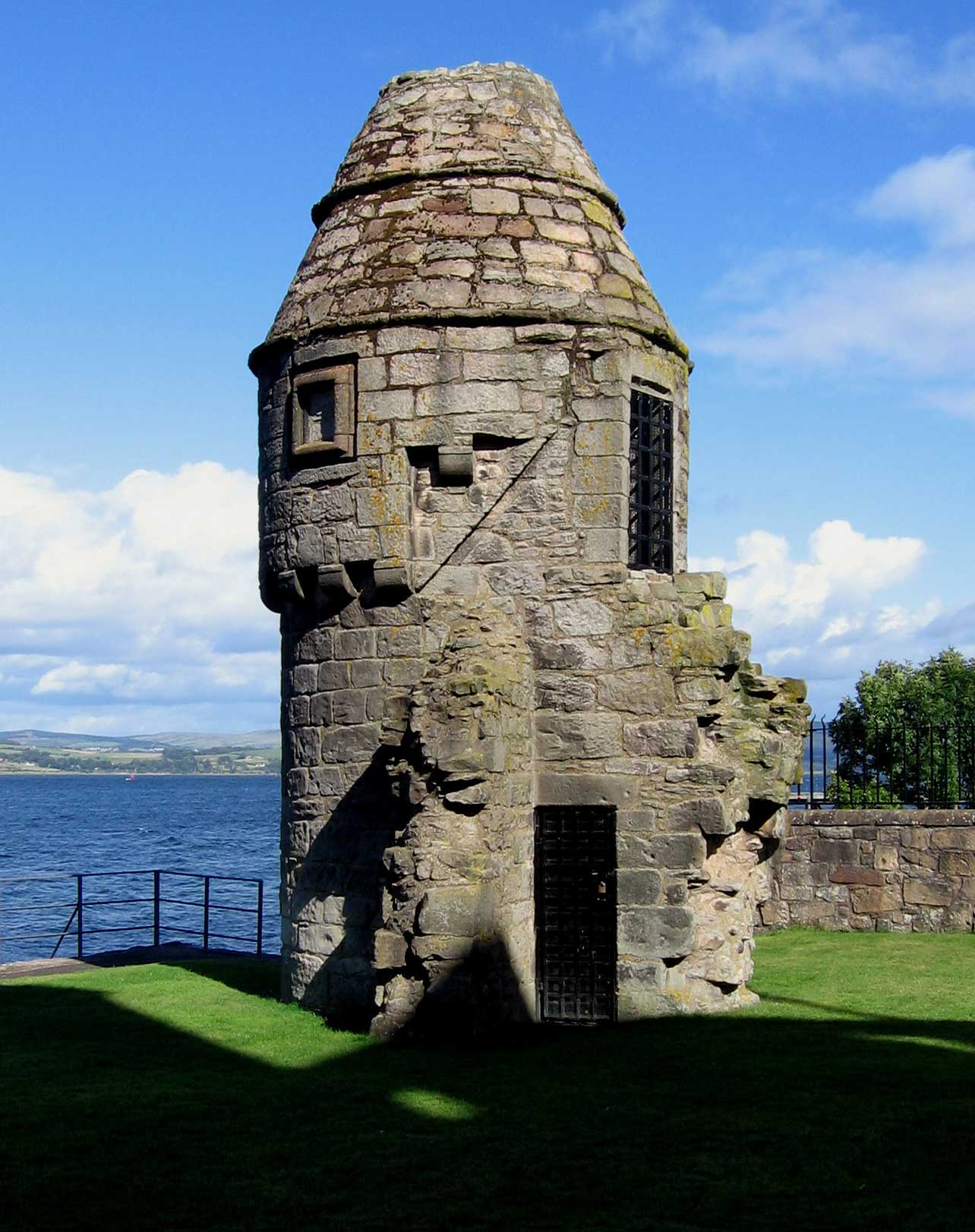
At Newark Castle, Port Glasgow, a corner tower of the outer defensive wall was converted to a doocot in 1597 when the wall was demolished.

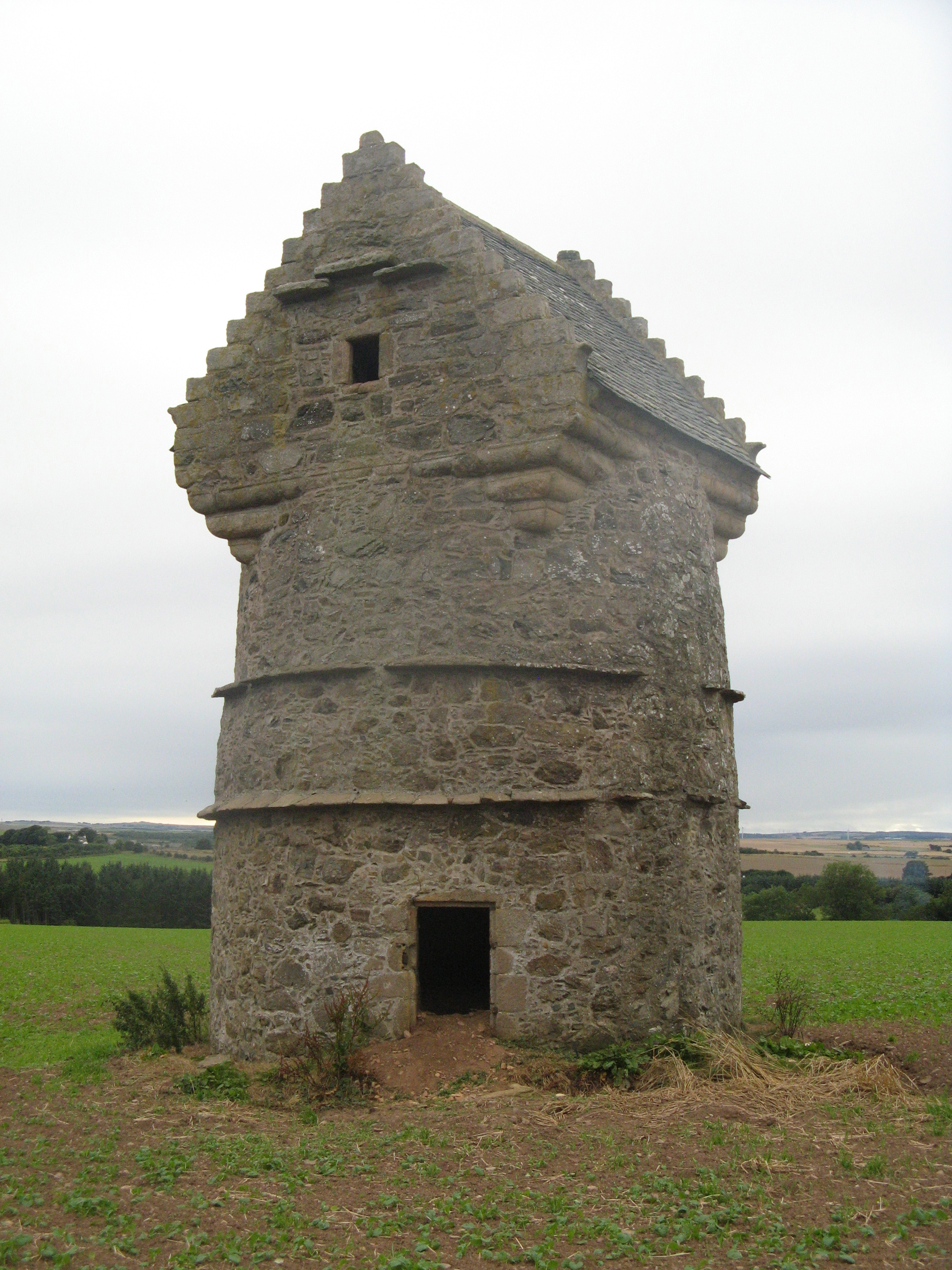
Doocot at Auchmacoy, Crawhead, Aberdeenshire, built 1638

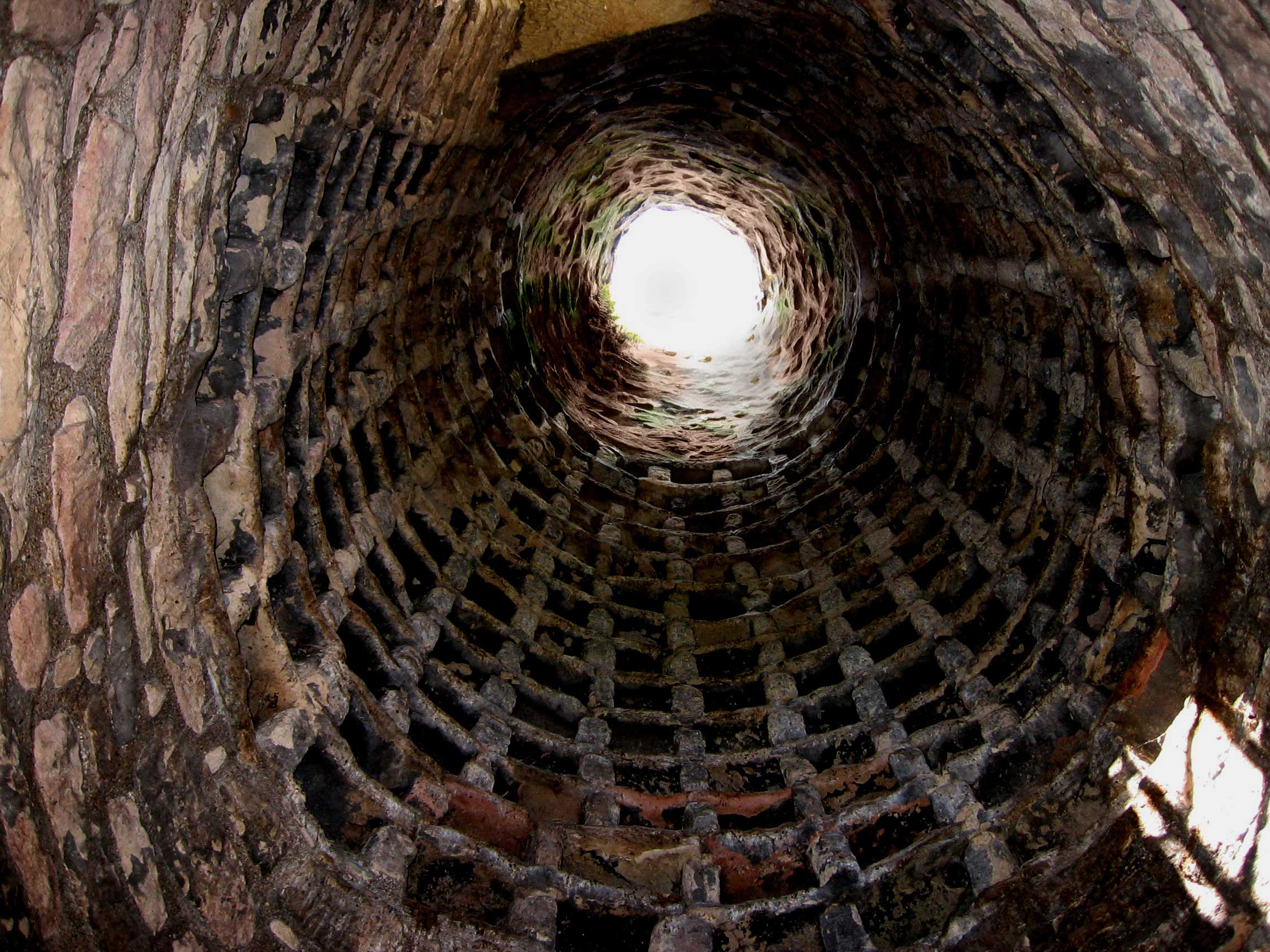
Looking up inside the doocot at Newark Castle, Port Glasgow

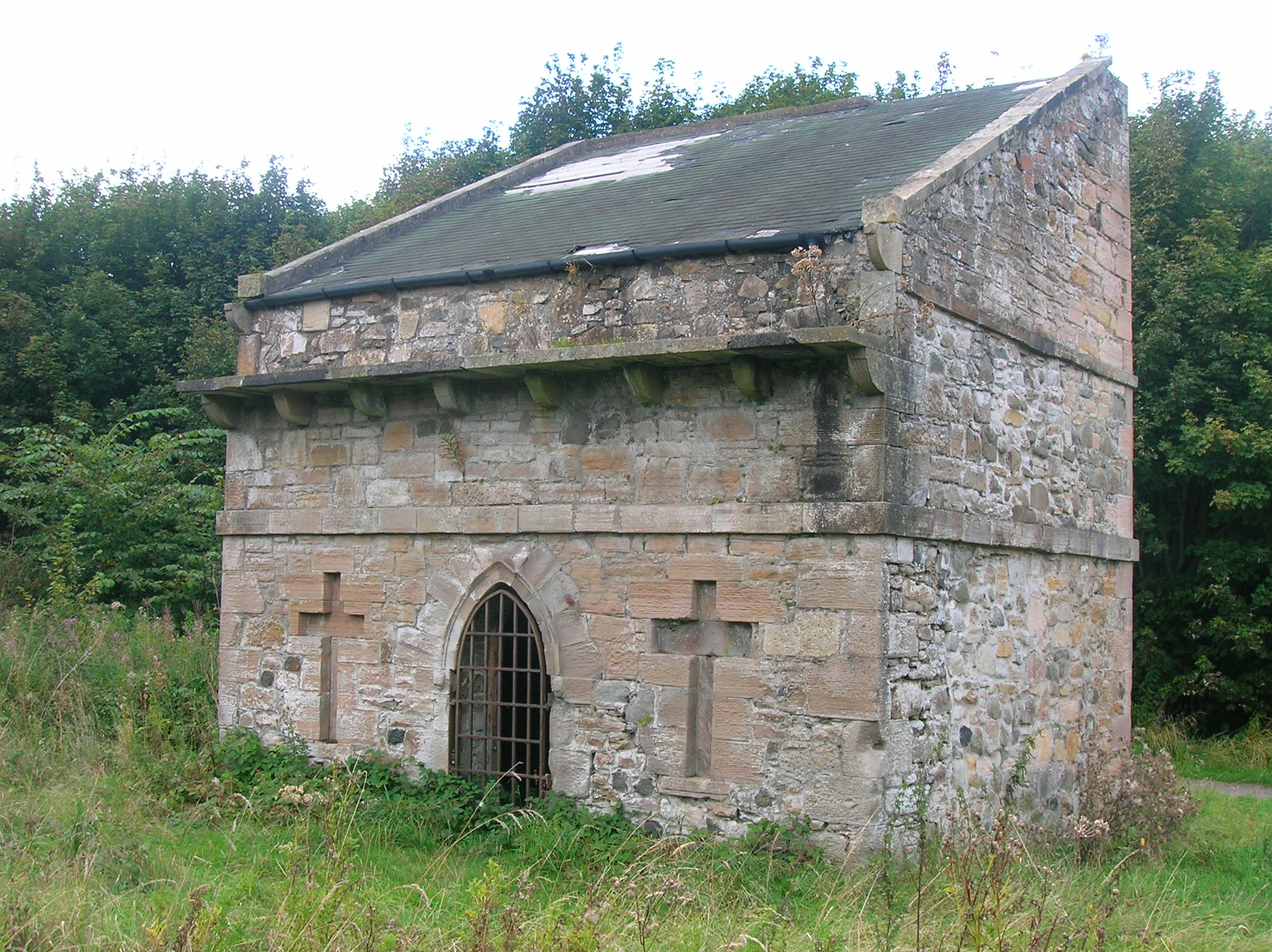
Lectern-style doocot at the site of the old Eglinton Mains farm in Ayrshire, Scotland

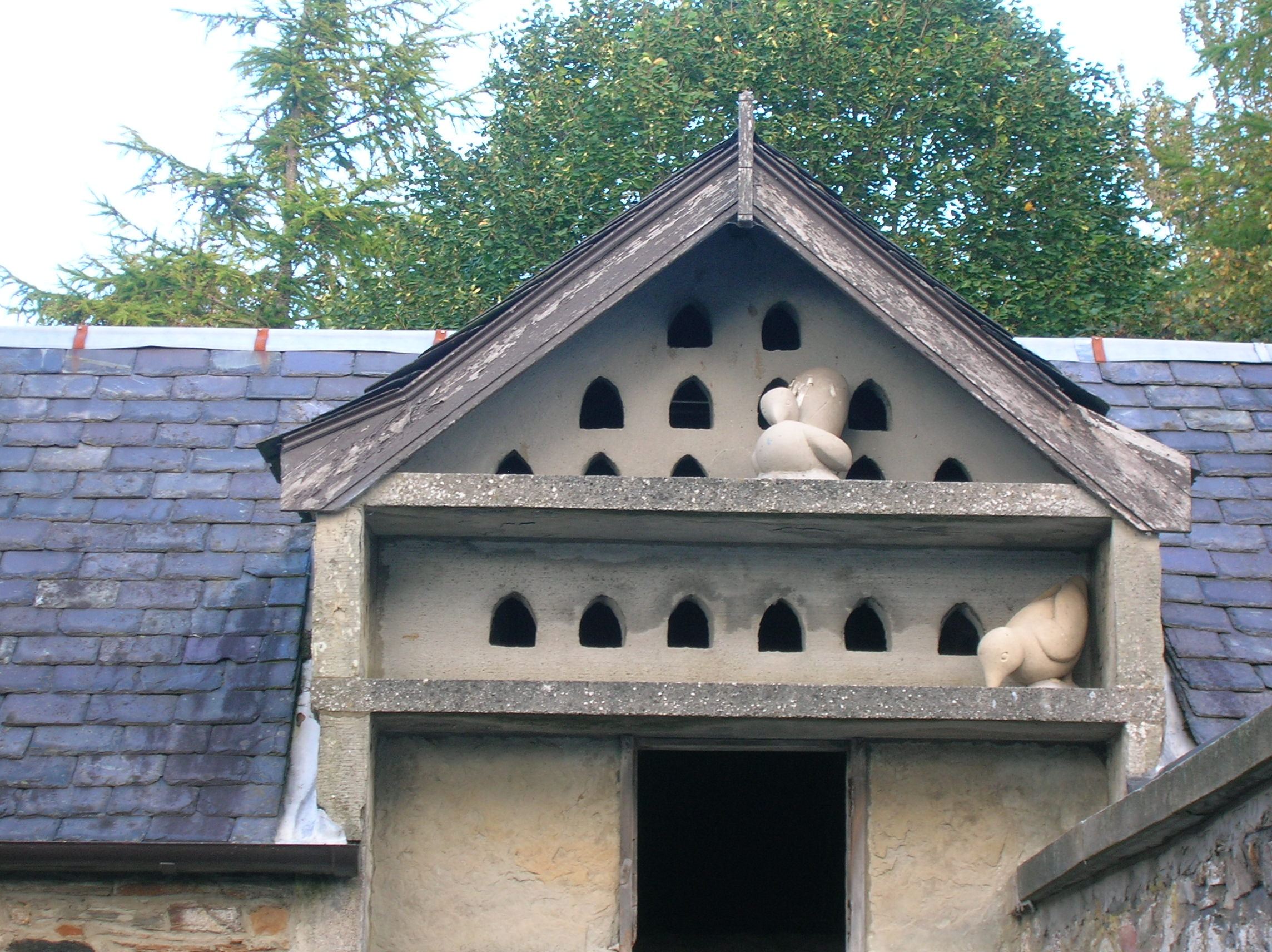
Doocot at the Eglinton castle stables courtyard

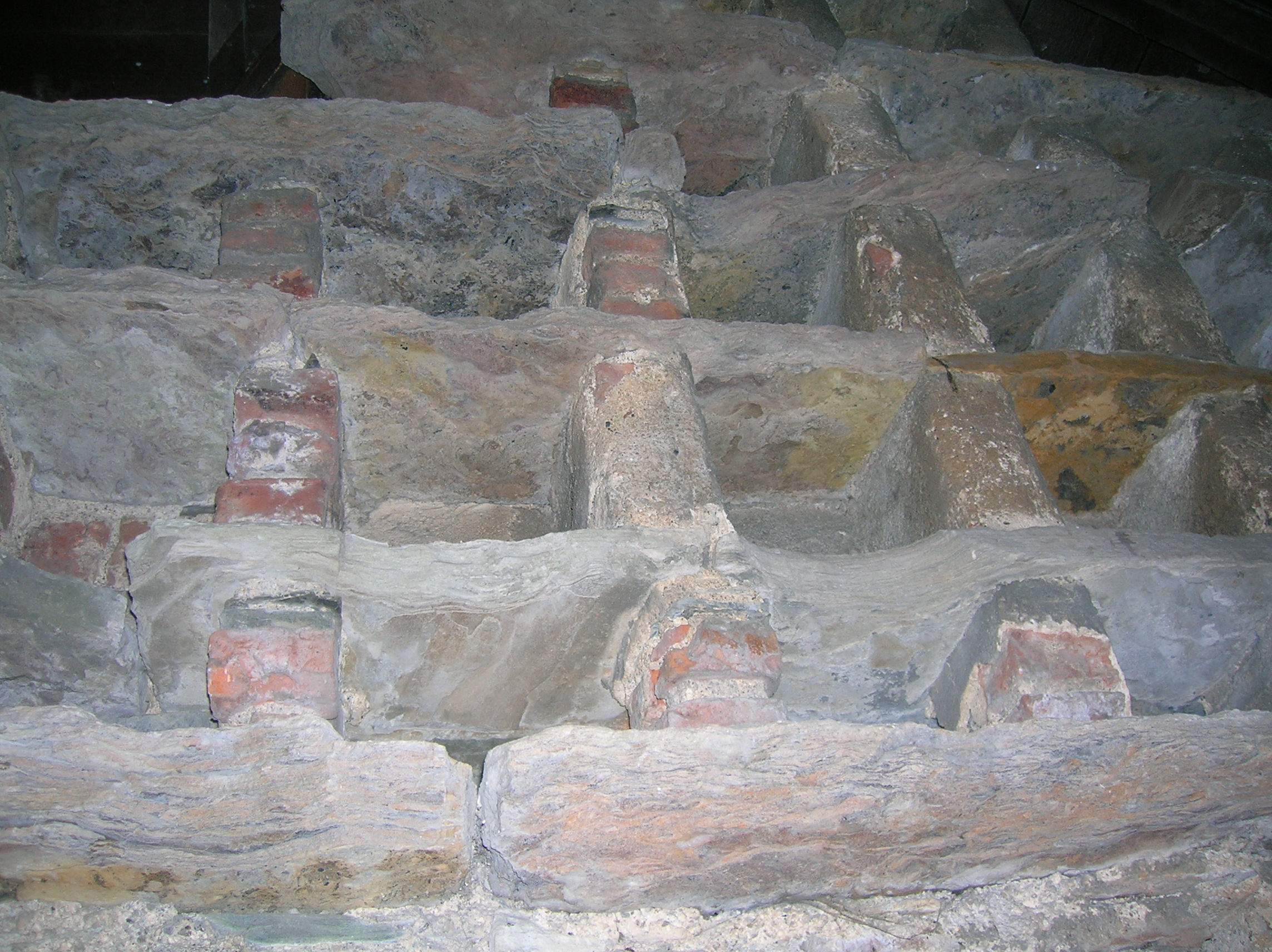
Nesting boxes in the Eglinton doocot

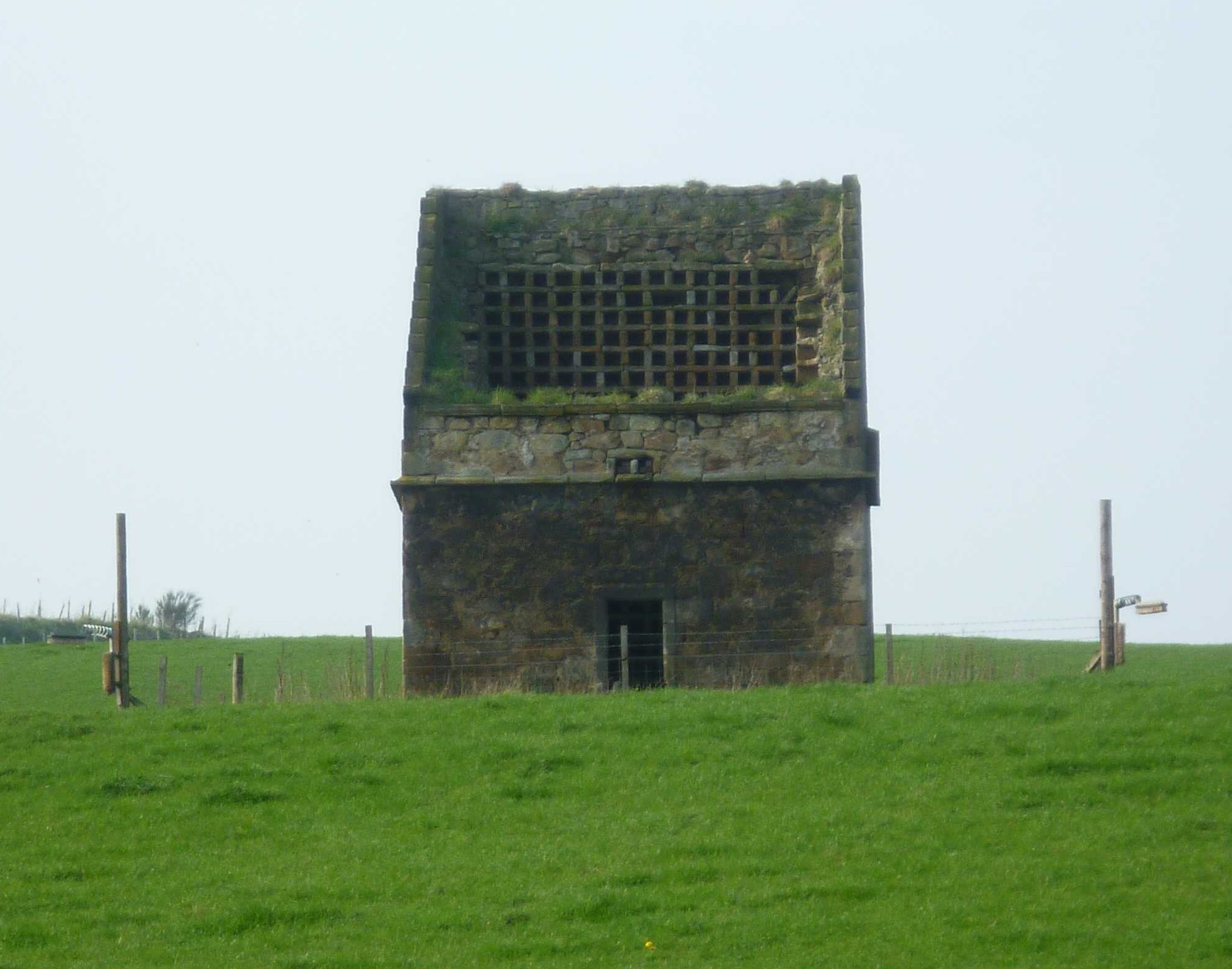
Ruined doocot at Newbigging near Aberdour, Scotland, revealing the nesting boxes

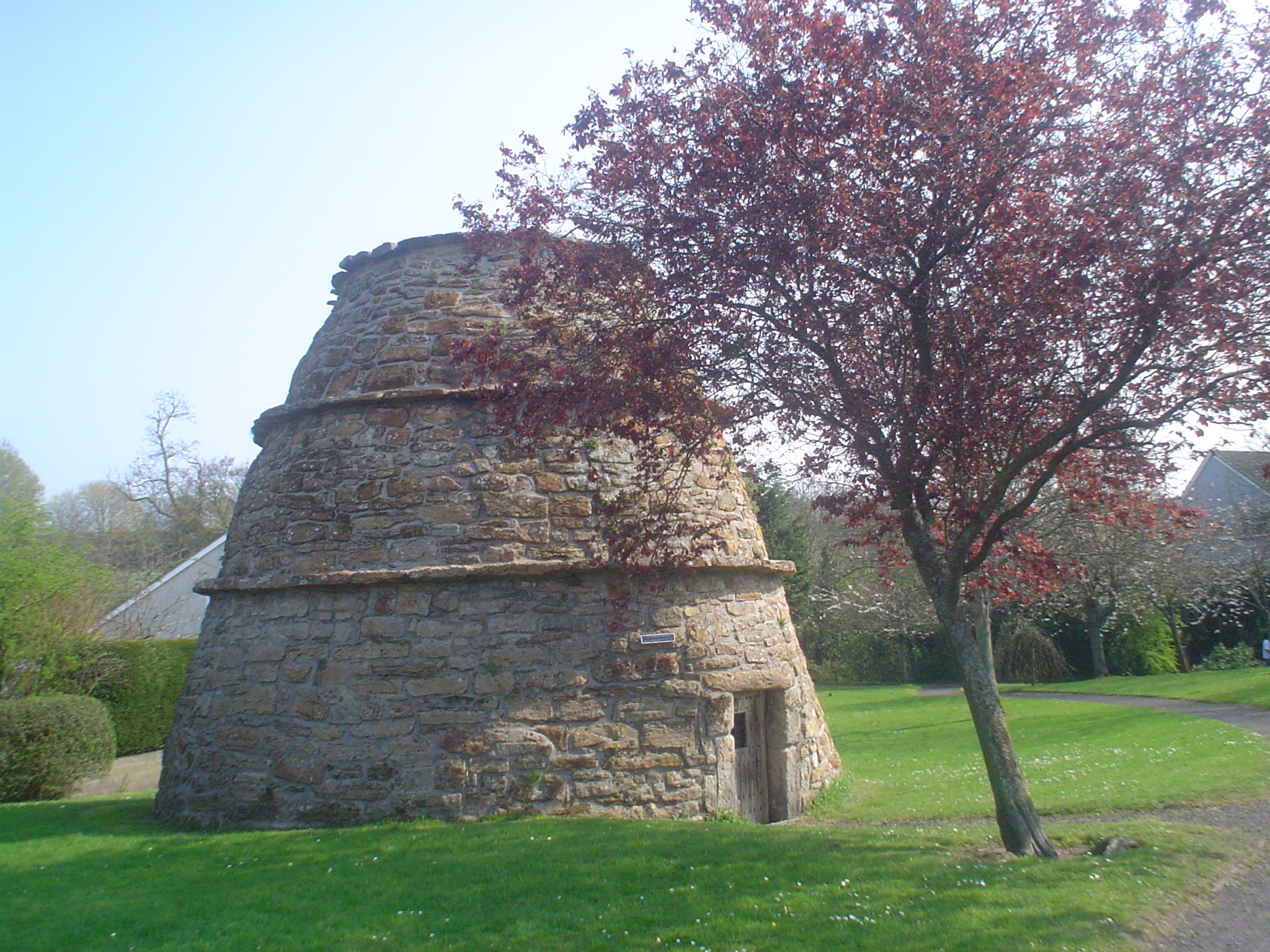
Bogward doocot, St Andrews, restored by the St Andrews Preservation Trust

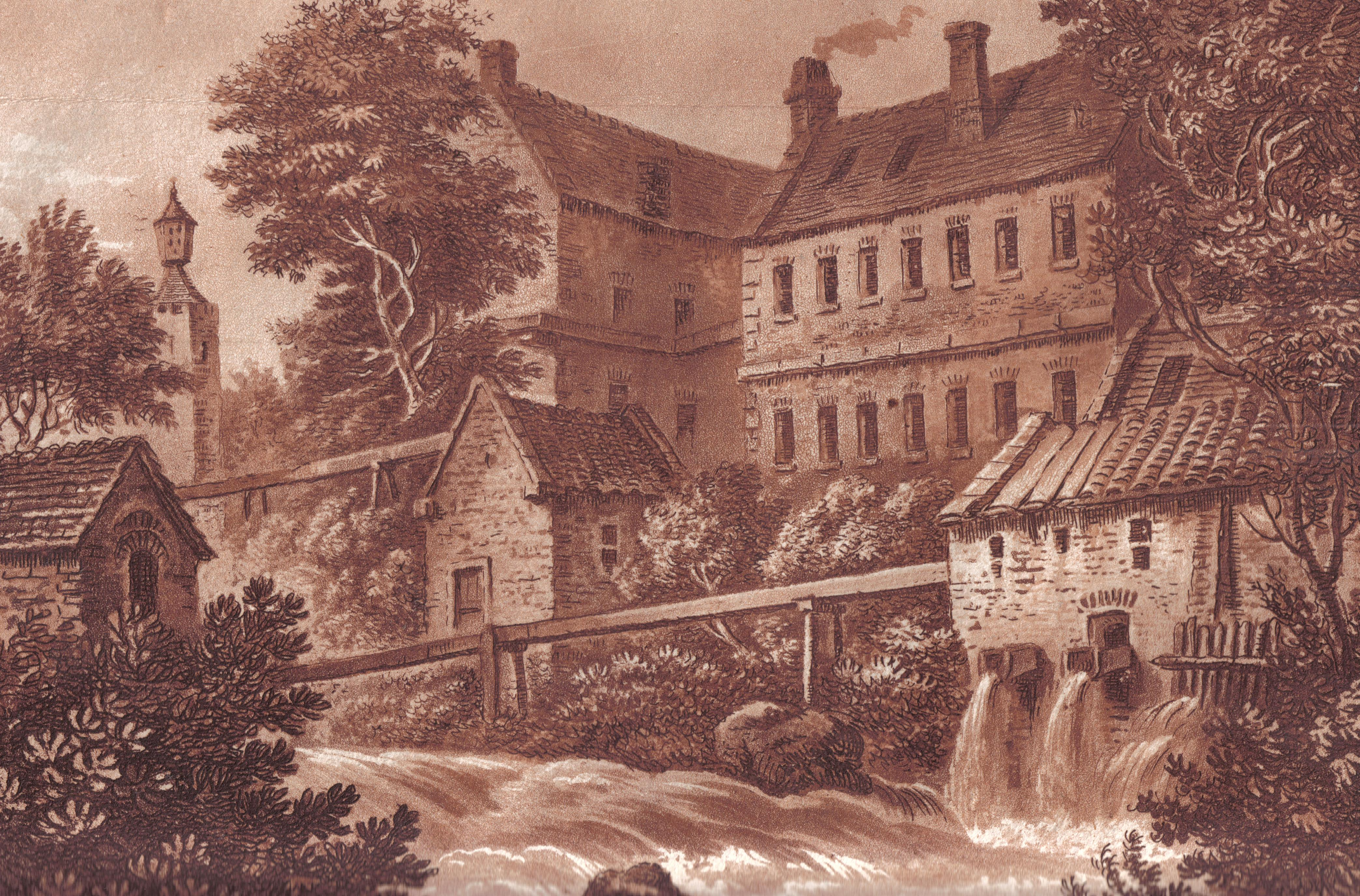
Mills at Milton of Campsie with a tall doocot in the background

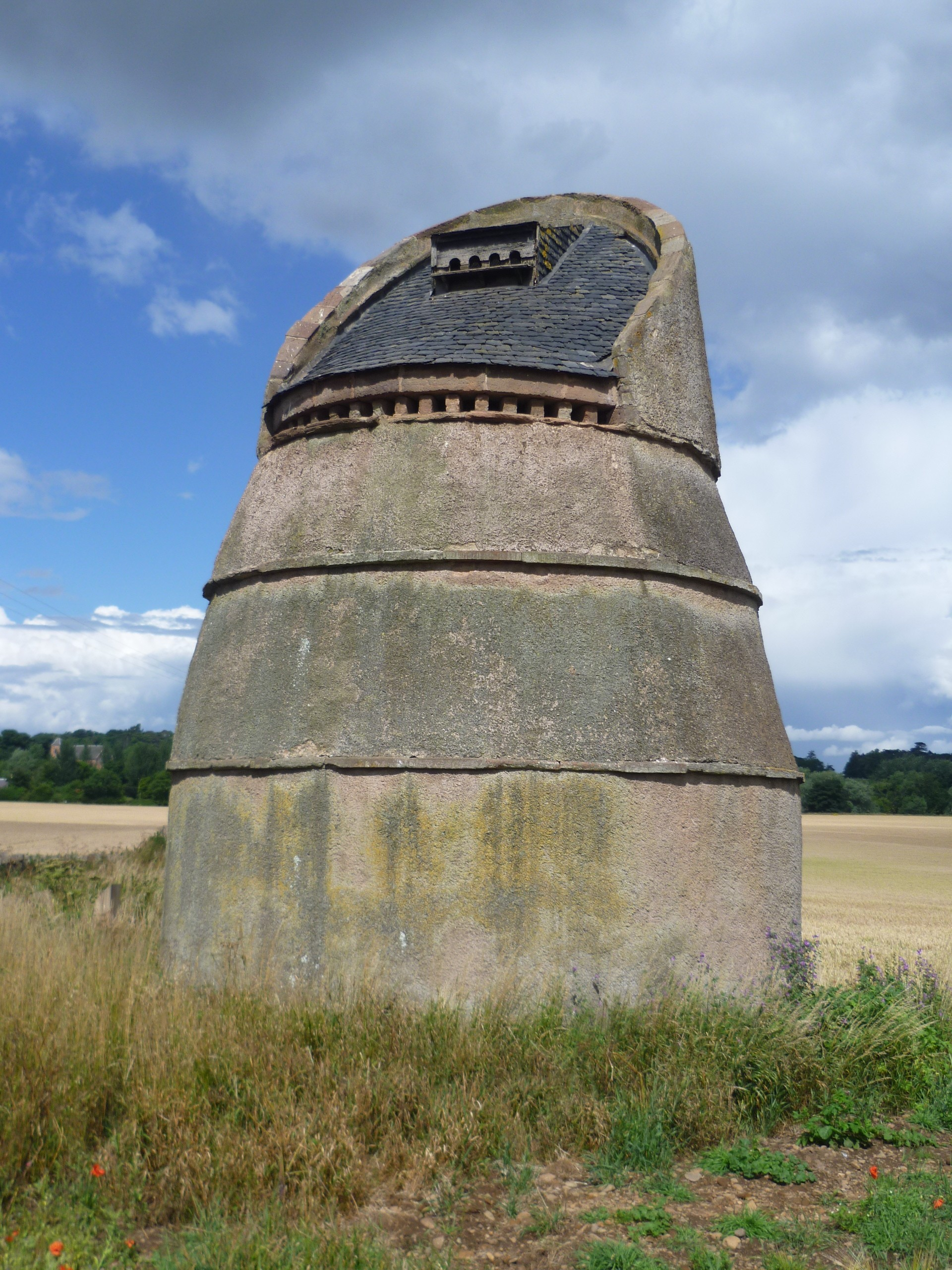
16th-century doocot at Phantassie, East Lothian

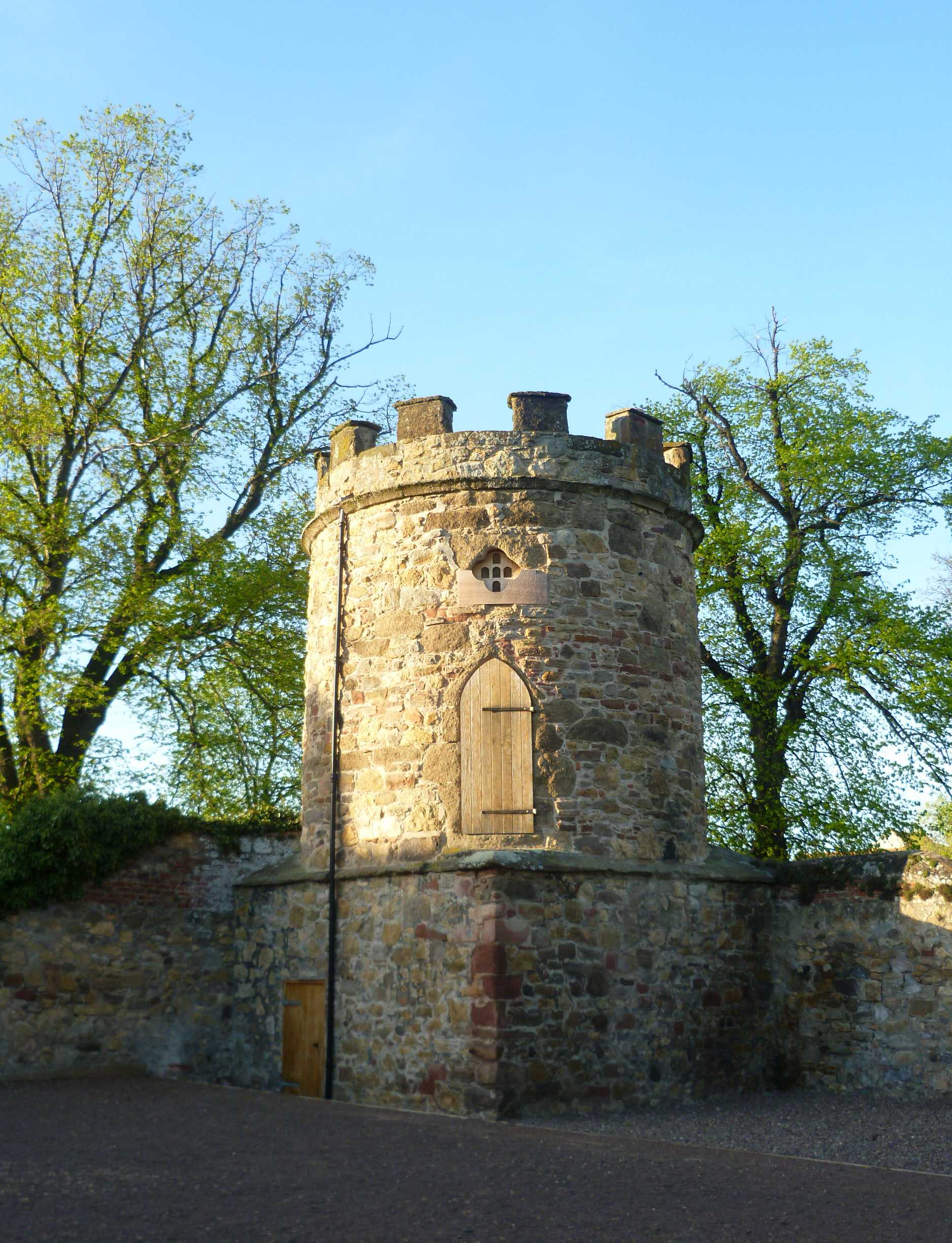
Lady Kitty's doocot at Haddington, Scotland, incorporated into a garden wall

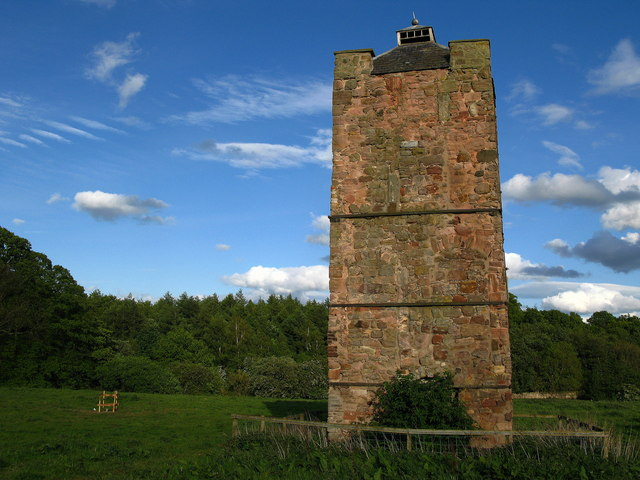
Doocot converted from the stair tower of a demolished house at Sheriffhall near Dalkeith, Scotland

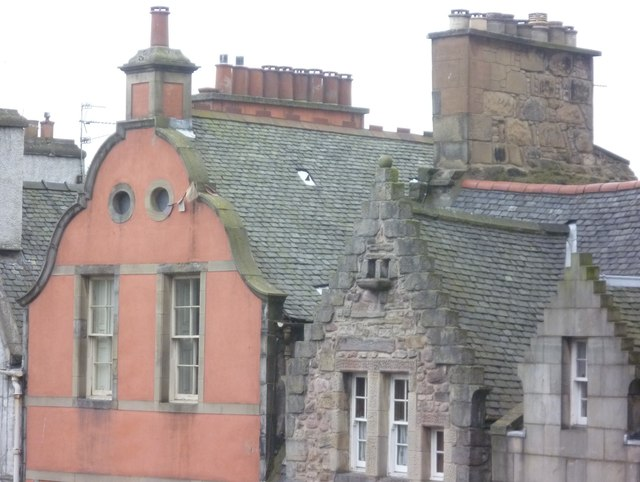
Two house doocots in the West Bow, Edinburgh, Scotland

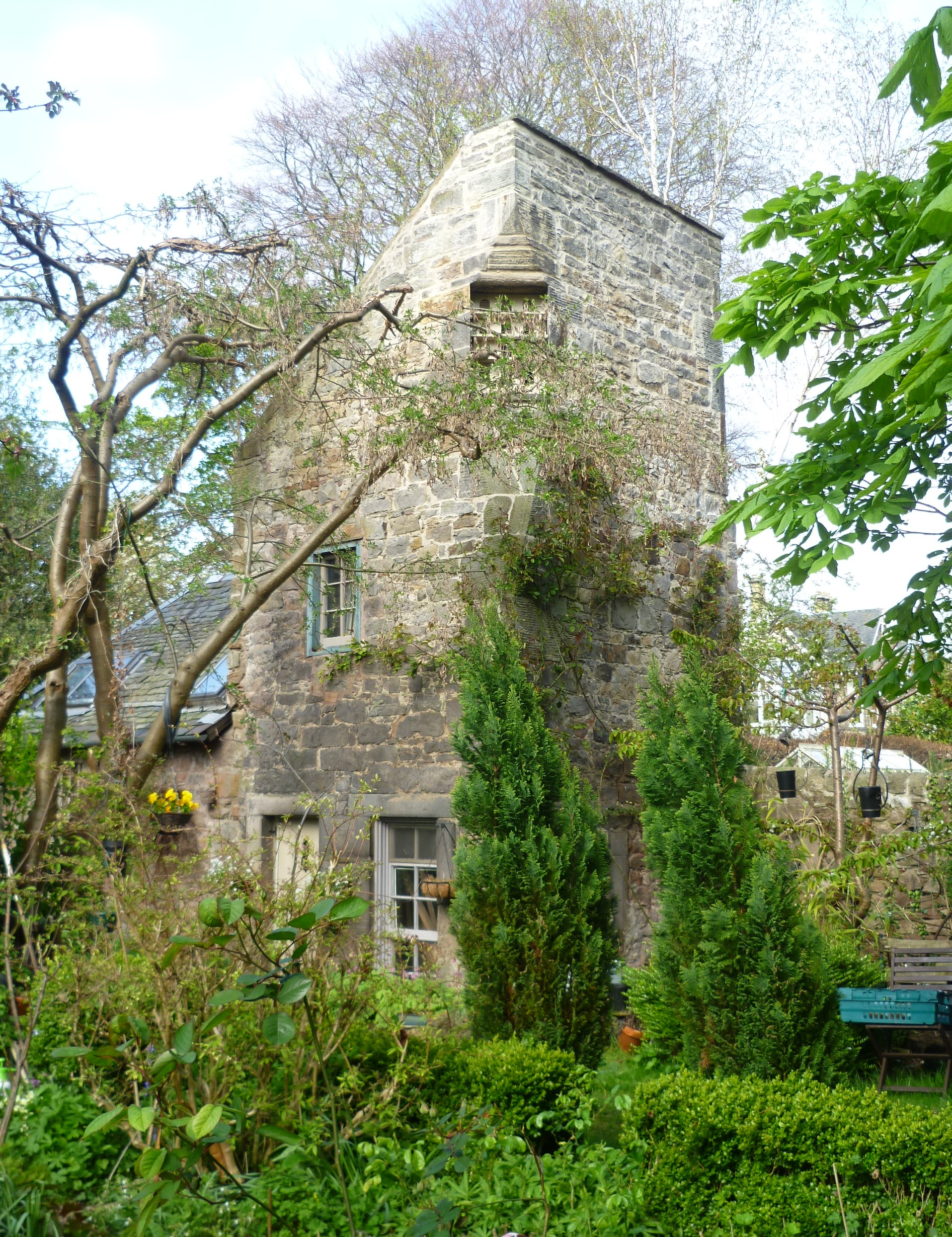
Doocot c. 1730 in the grounds of a private house, Edinburgh, Scotland

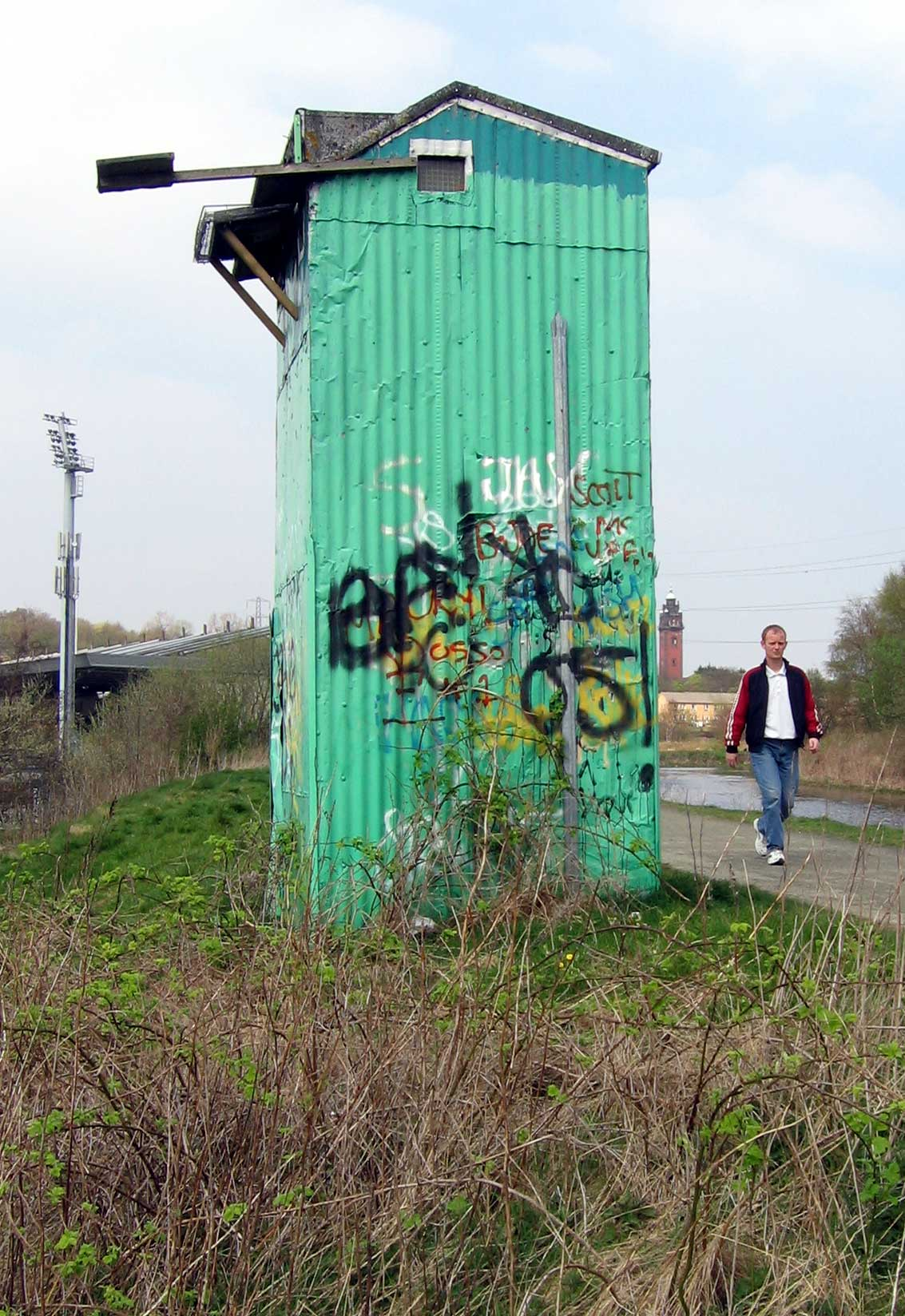
Urban doocot in Glasgow, Scotland

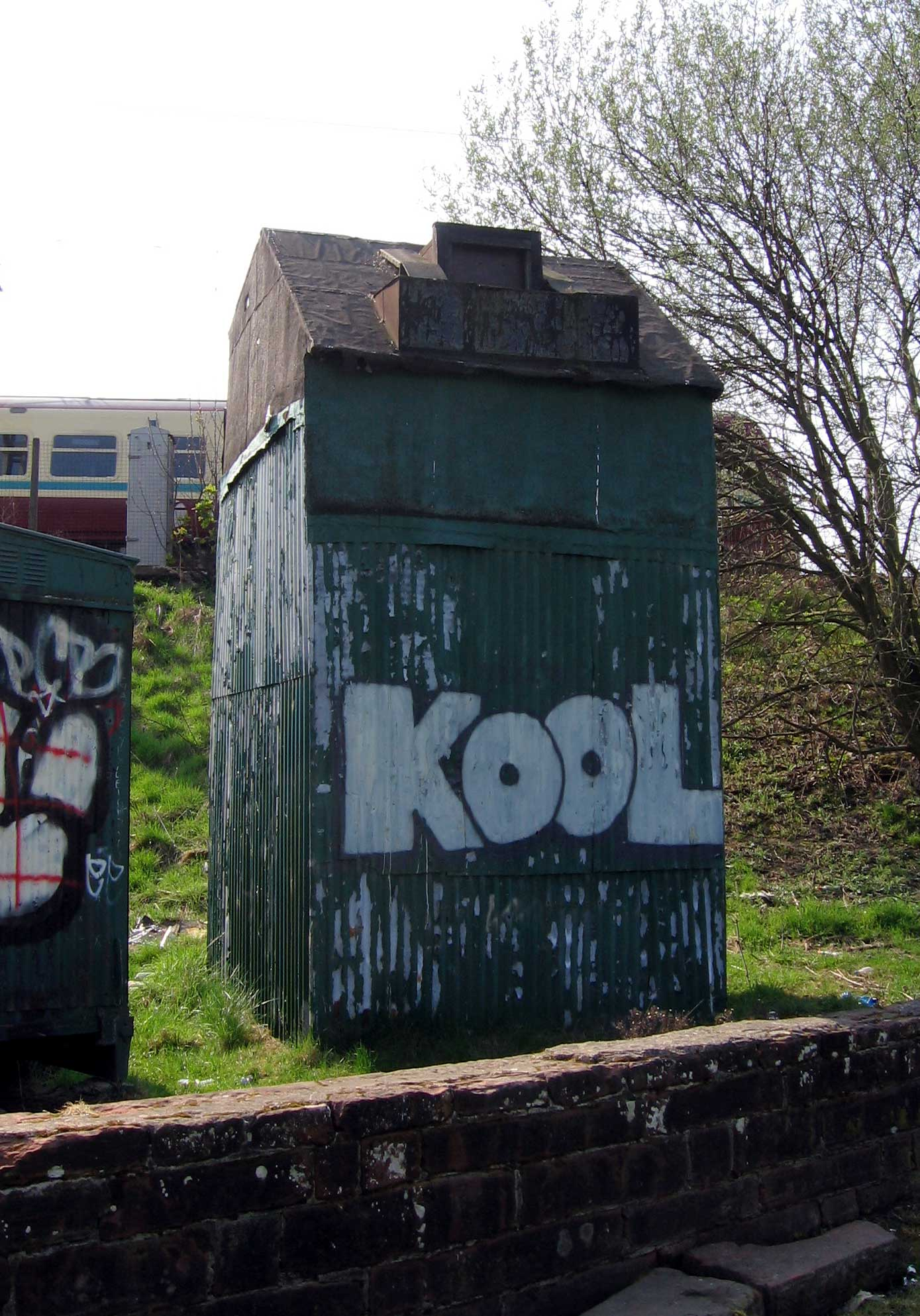
Urban doocot in Glasgow, Scotland

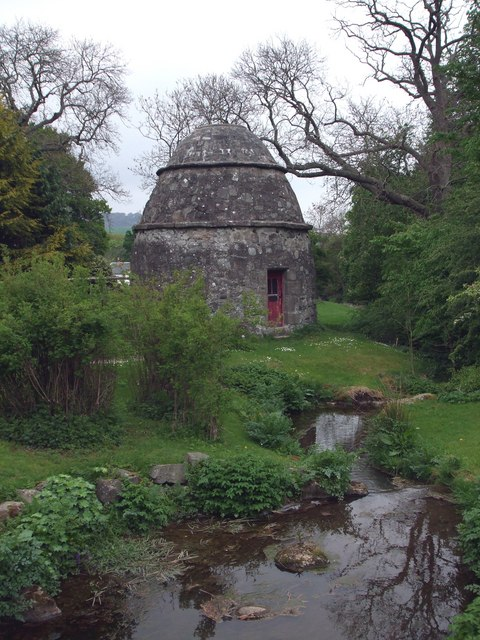
16th-century doocot at Elcho Castle, Scotland

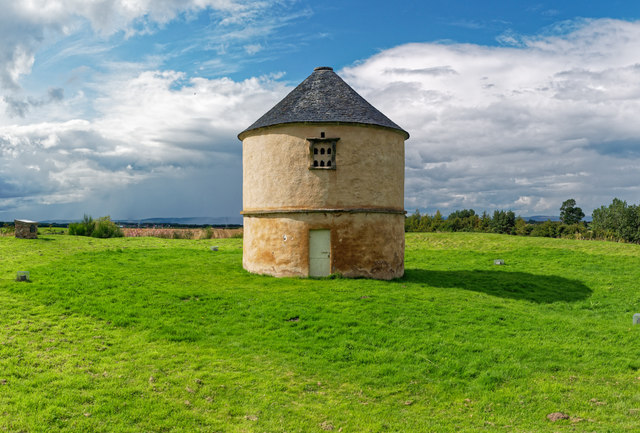
17th-century doocot at Boath, Nairn, Scotland

=== North America ===
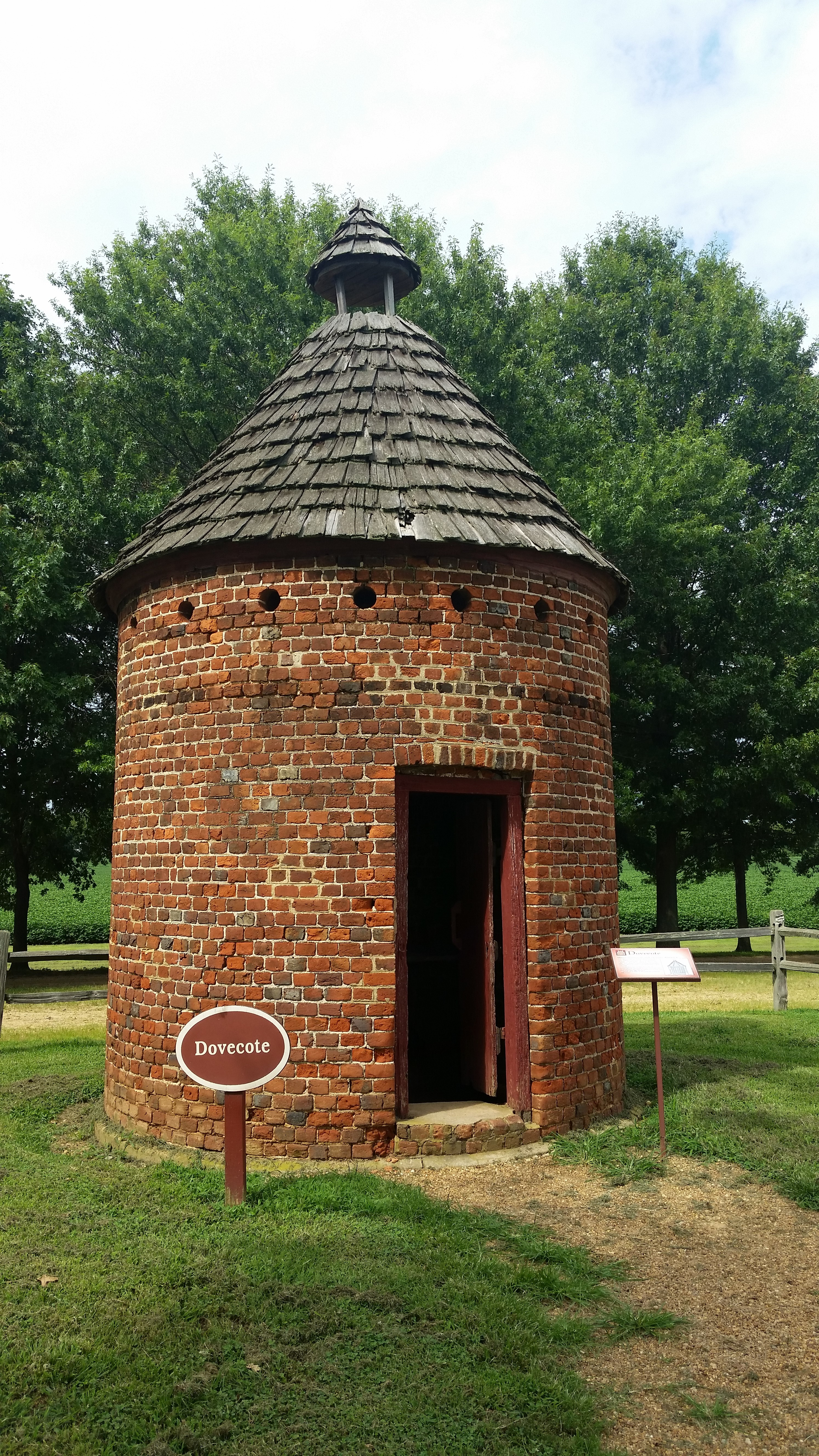
Shirley Plantation dovecote

In the U.S., an alternative English name for dovecotes is pigeonaire (from French). This word is more common than "dovecote" in Louisiana and other areas with a heavy Francophonic heritage.

Québec City, Canada, has a pigeonnier that stands in a square in Old Québec; the Pigeonnier is also the name of the square itself and is where street artists present their shows.

A notable frame dovecote is located at Bowman's Folly in Accomack County, Virginia, added to the National Register of Historic Places in 1974.

== Architecture ==
=== Functional ===
Their location is chosen away from large trees that can house raptors and shielded from prevailing winds. Their construction obeys a few safety rules: tight access doors and smooth walls with a protruding band of stones (or other smooth surface) to prohibit the entry of climbing predators (martens, weasels...). The exterior façade was, if necessary, only evenly coated by a horizontal band, in order to prevent their ascent.

The dovecote materials can be very varied and shape and dimension extremely diverse:

square dovecote with quadruple vaulting
built before the fifteenth-century (Roquetaillade Castle, Bordeaux) or Saint-Trojan near Cognac
cylindrical tower
fourteenth century to the sixteenth century, and common until the present in parts of Spain, it is covered with curved tiles, flat tiles, stone lauzes roofing and occasionally with a dome of bricks. A window or skylight is the only opening.
dovecote on stone or wooden pillars
cylindrical, hexagonal or square;
hexagonal dovecote
like the dovecotes of the Royal Mail at Sauzé-Vaussais;
square dovecote with flat roof tiles
seventeenth century and a slate roof in the eighteenth century;
lean-to structure
propped against the sides of buildings.

Inside, a dovecote could be virtually empty (boulins being located in the walls from bottom to top), the interior reduced to only housing a rotating ladder, or "potence", that facilitated maintenance and the collection of eggs and squabs.

=== Decorative ===
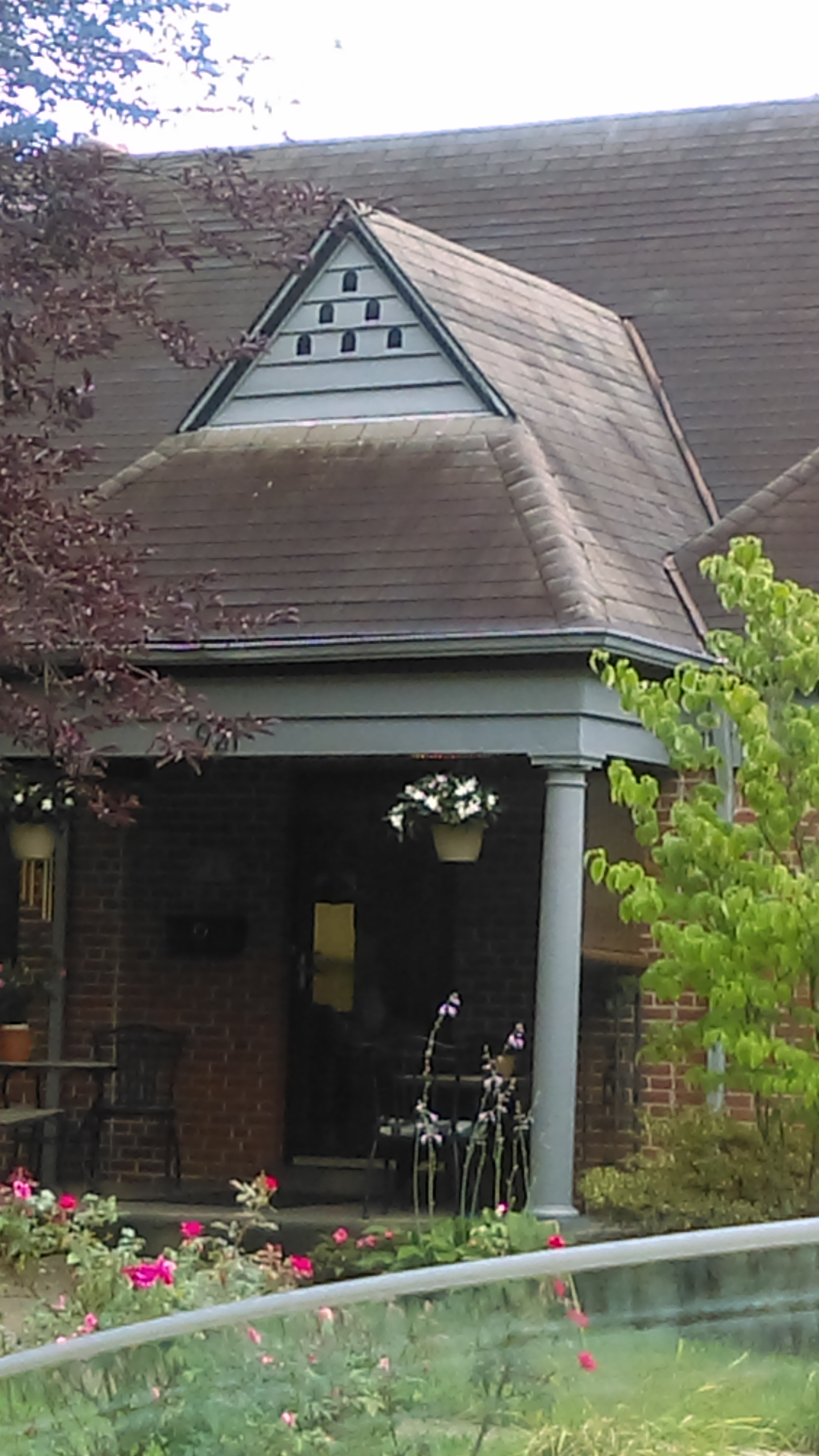
Decorative dovecote on house gable in Finneytown, Ohio

Gable and rooftop dovecotes are associated with storybook houses with whimsical design elements.

A dovecote is a small, decorative shelter for pigeons, often built on top of a house. It looks like a receptacle for secret messages from a fairy-tale world, and this whimsy makes up for the fact that no one actually wants pigeons roosting on their house. Dovecotes are especially common in certain parts of the Los Angeles suburbs, on 'storybook ranch' homes — houses recast on the exterior to resemble a cottage that one of the Seven Dwarves might live in.

== Gallery ==
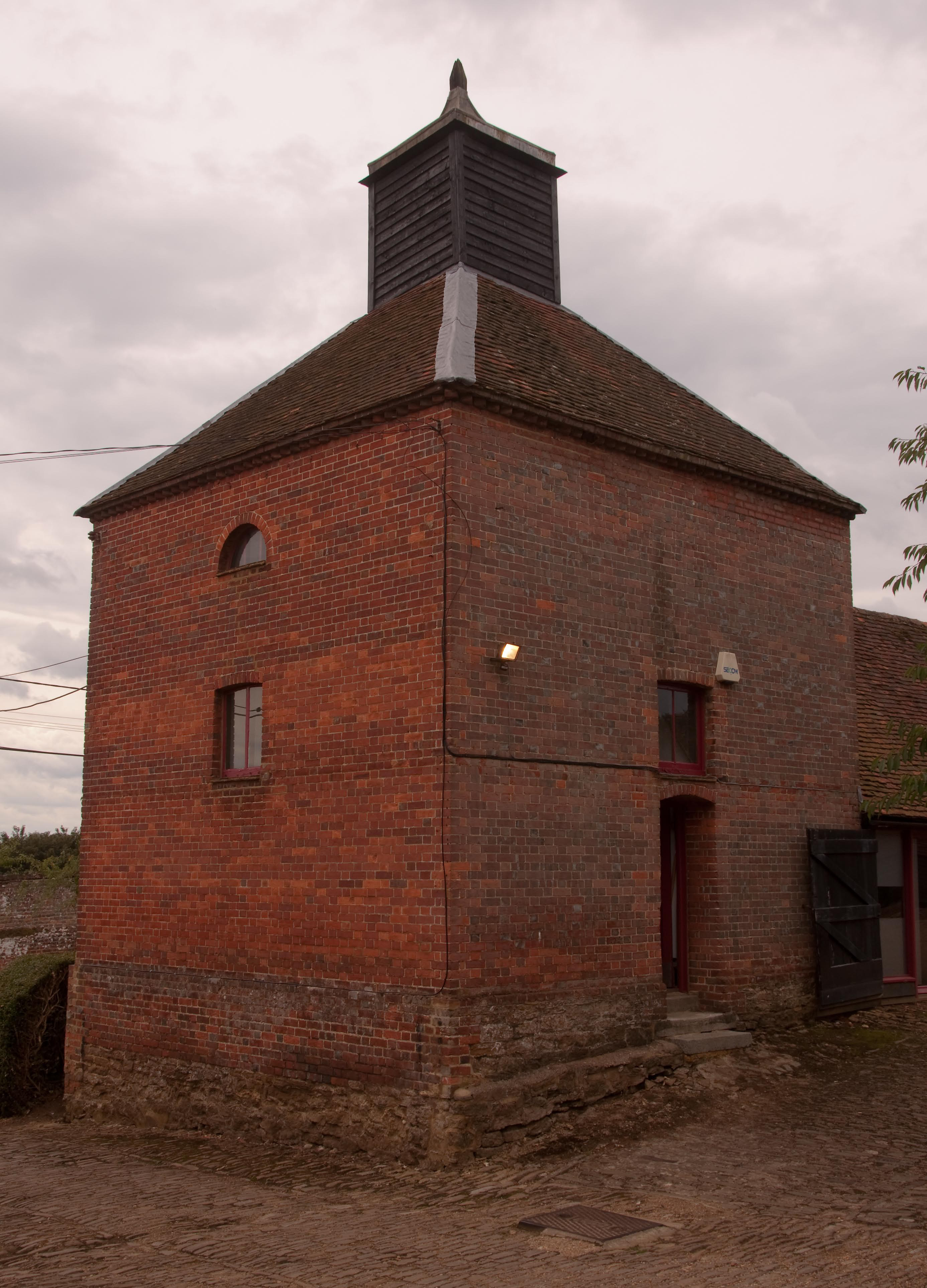
Peper Harow Dovecote

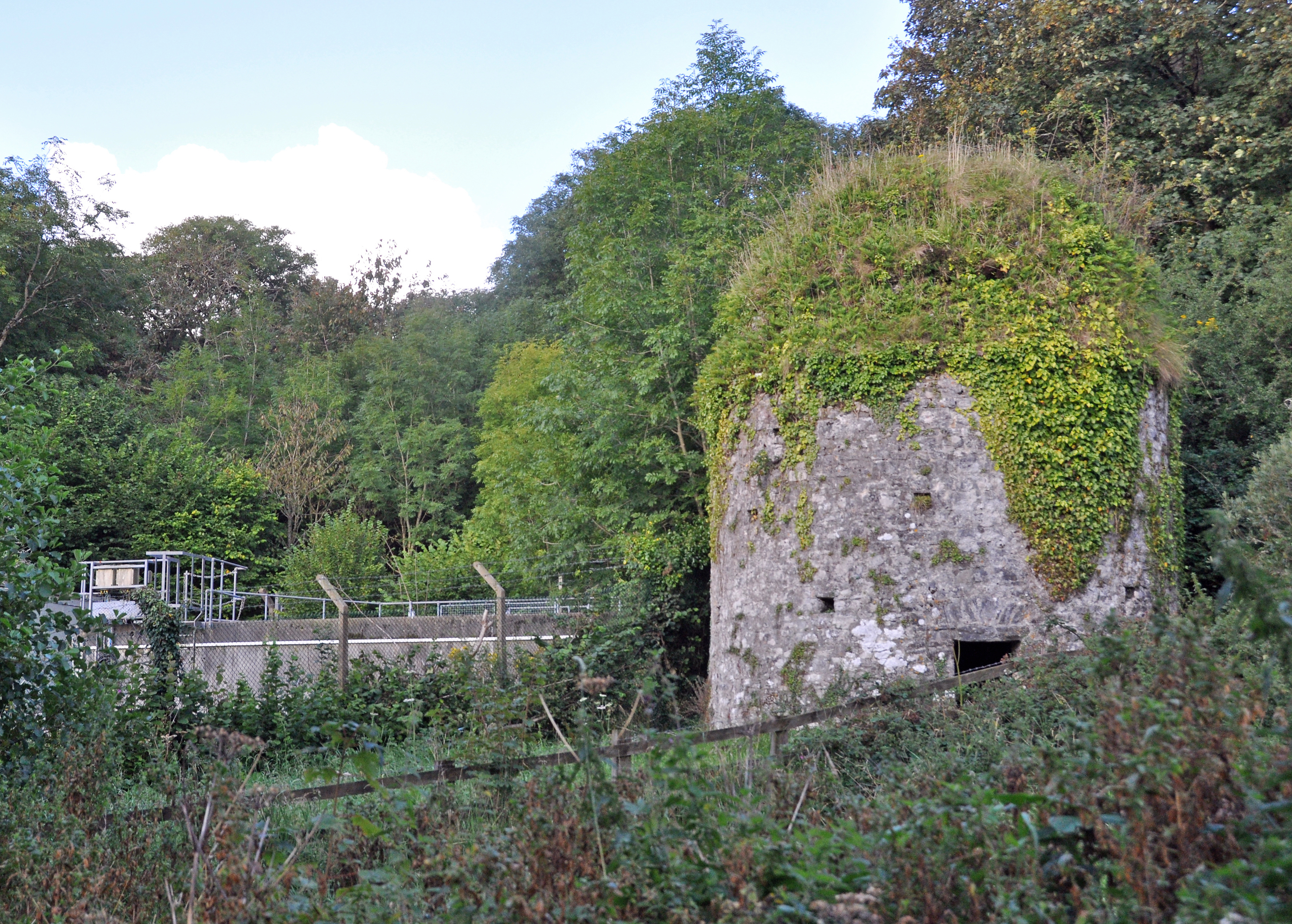
Manorbier Dovecote

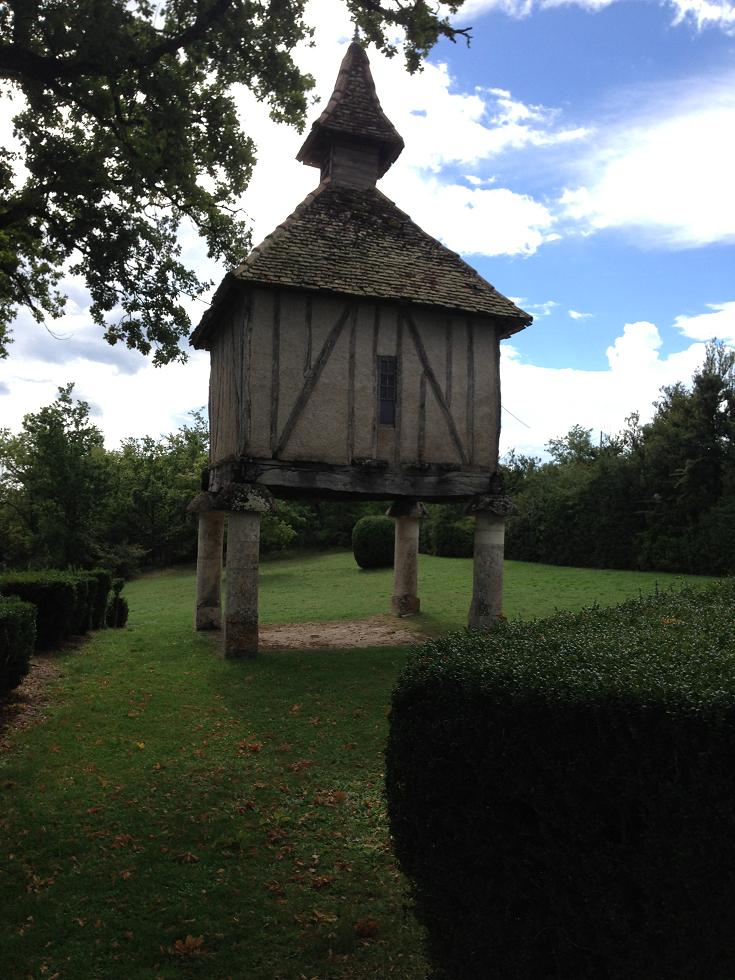
A dovecote in the Tarn-et-Garonne department of France, near Lauzerte

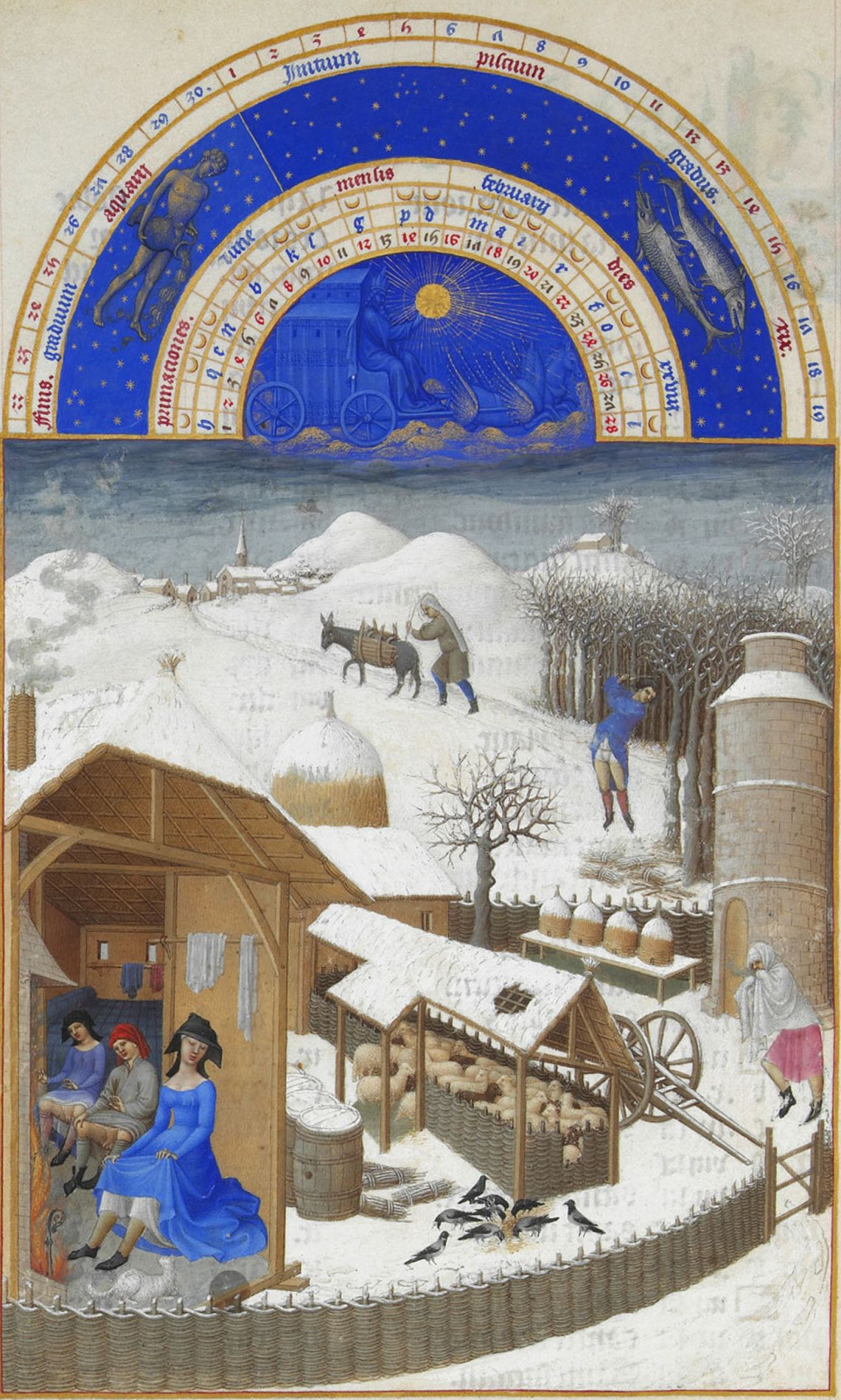
The month of February in the Limburg Brothers' Très Riches Heures du Duc de Berry, a painting dated 1416, showing a dovecote

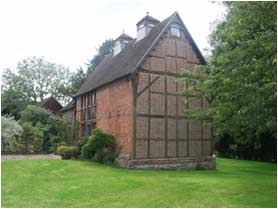
The Dovecote, listed 16th-century dovecote in Long Wittenham

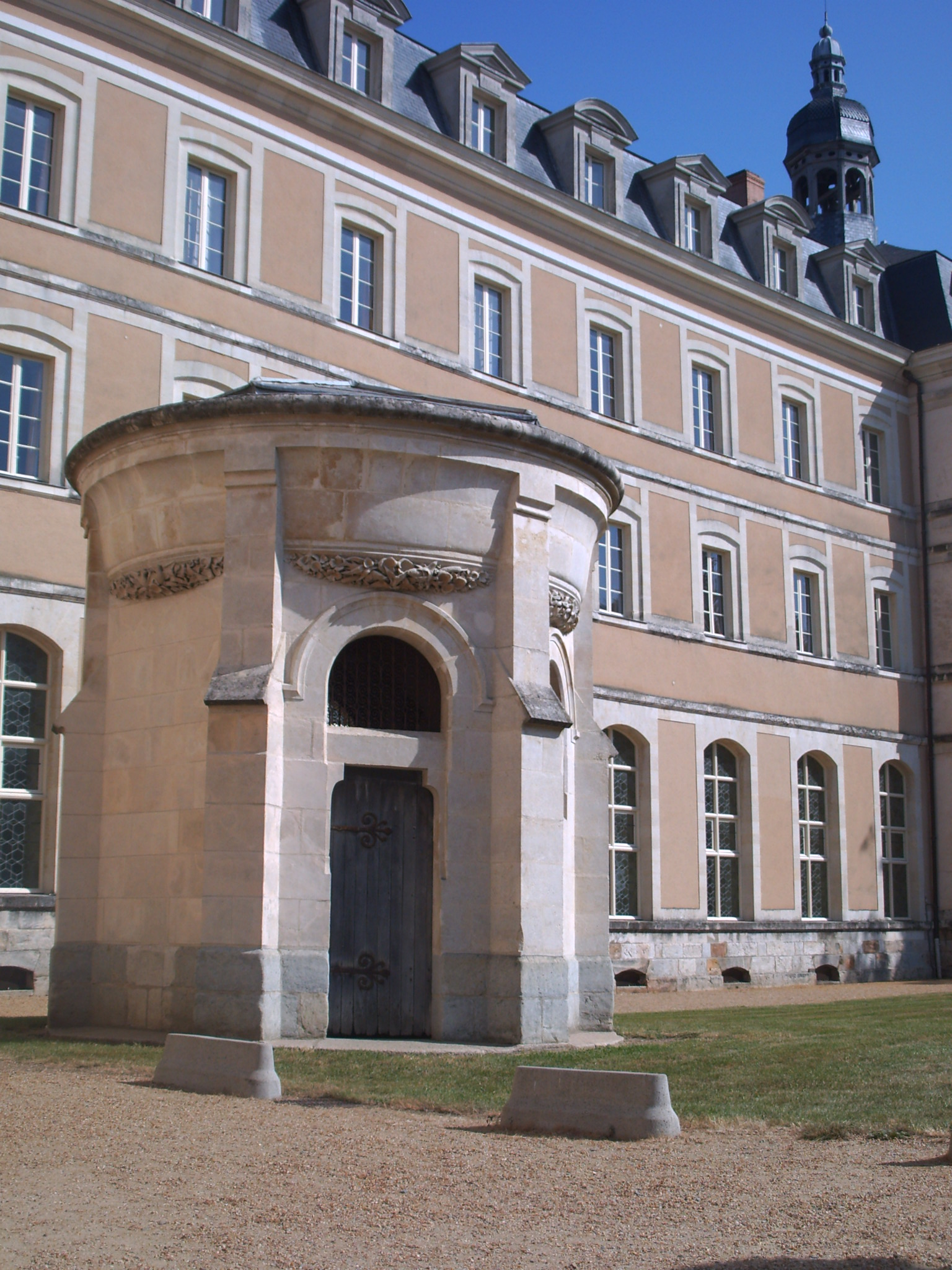
Dovecote at the Abbaye Saint-Vincent in Le Mans, France

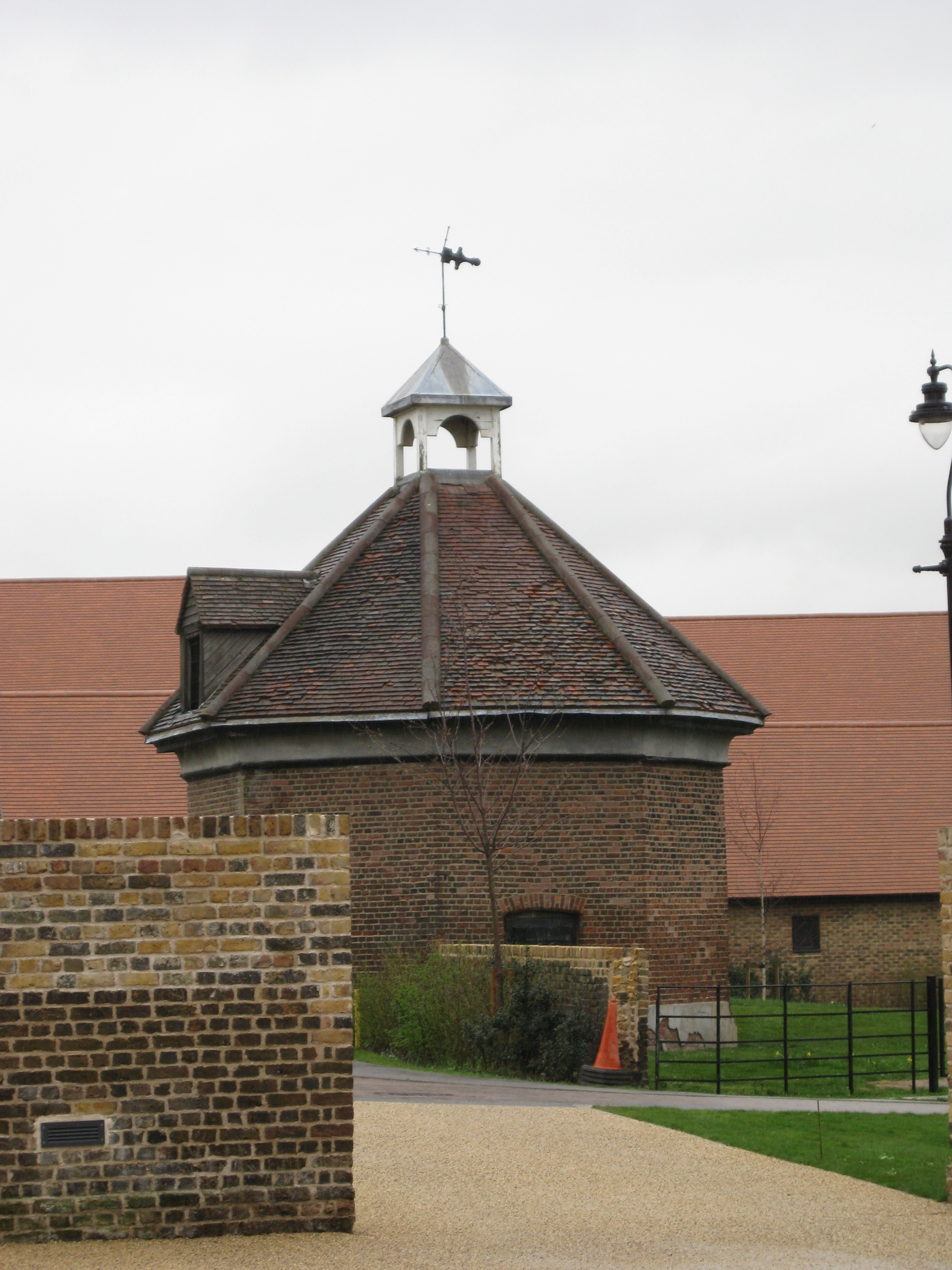
Dovecote at High House Purfleet, Essex

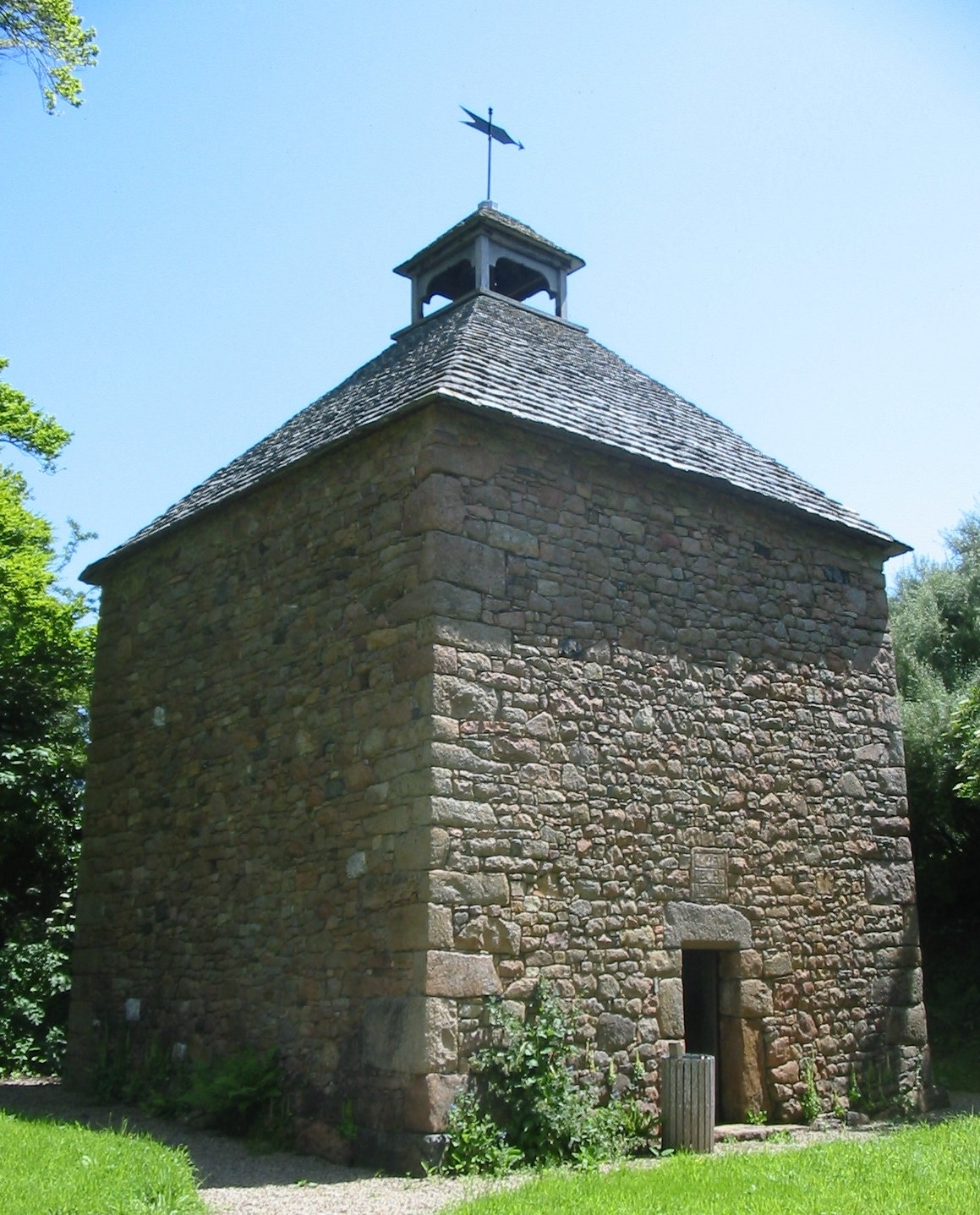
A colombier (dovecote) in Jersey, Channel Islands

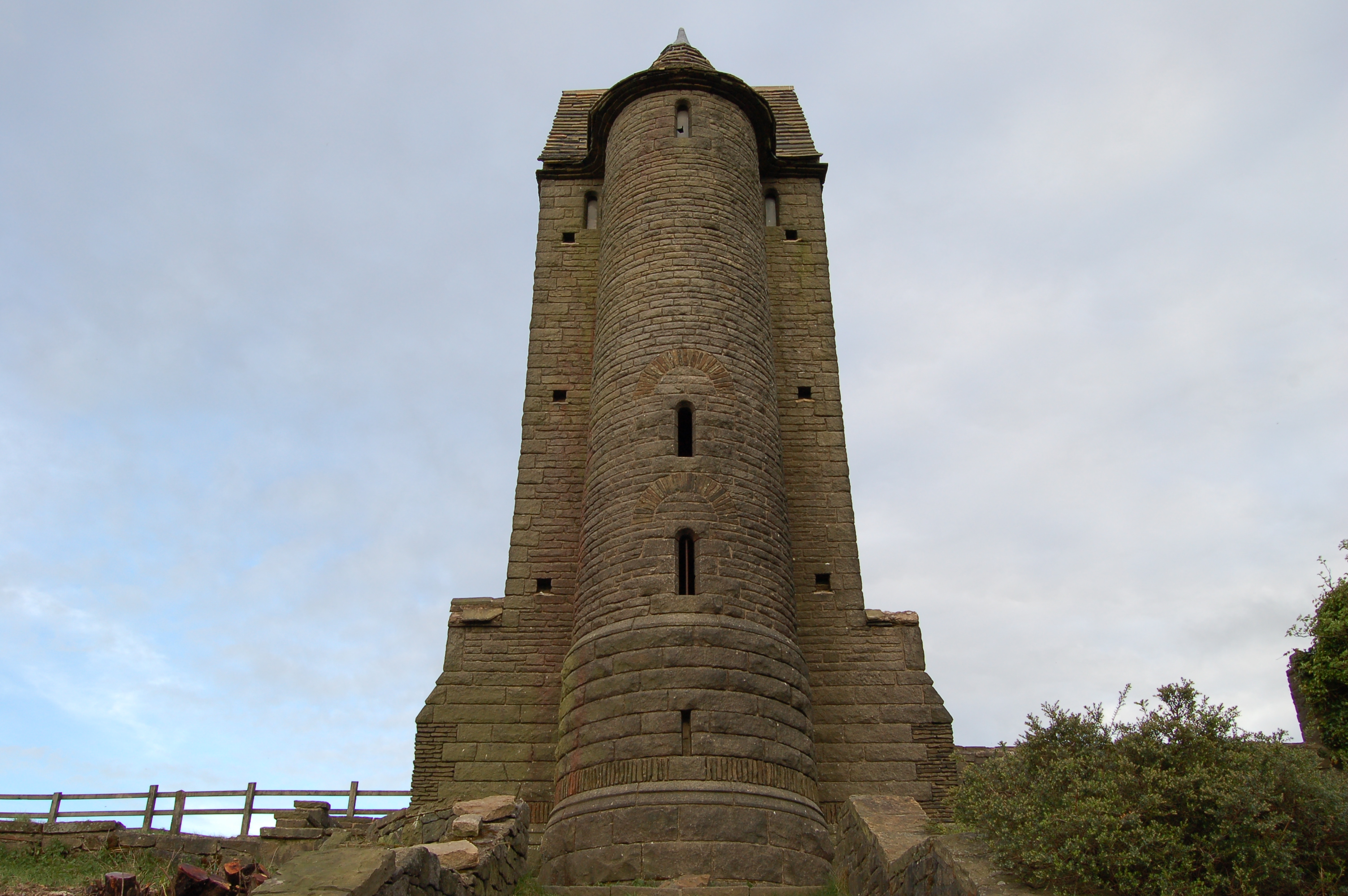
The Pigeon Tower at Rivington on the West Pennine Moors, England

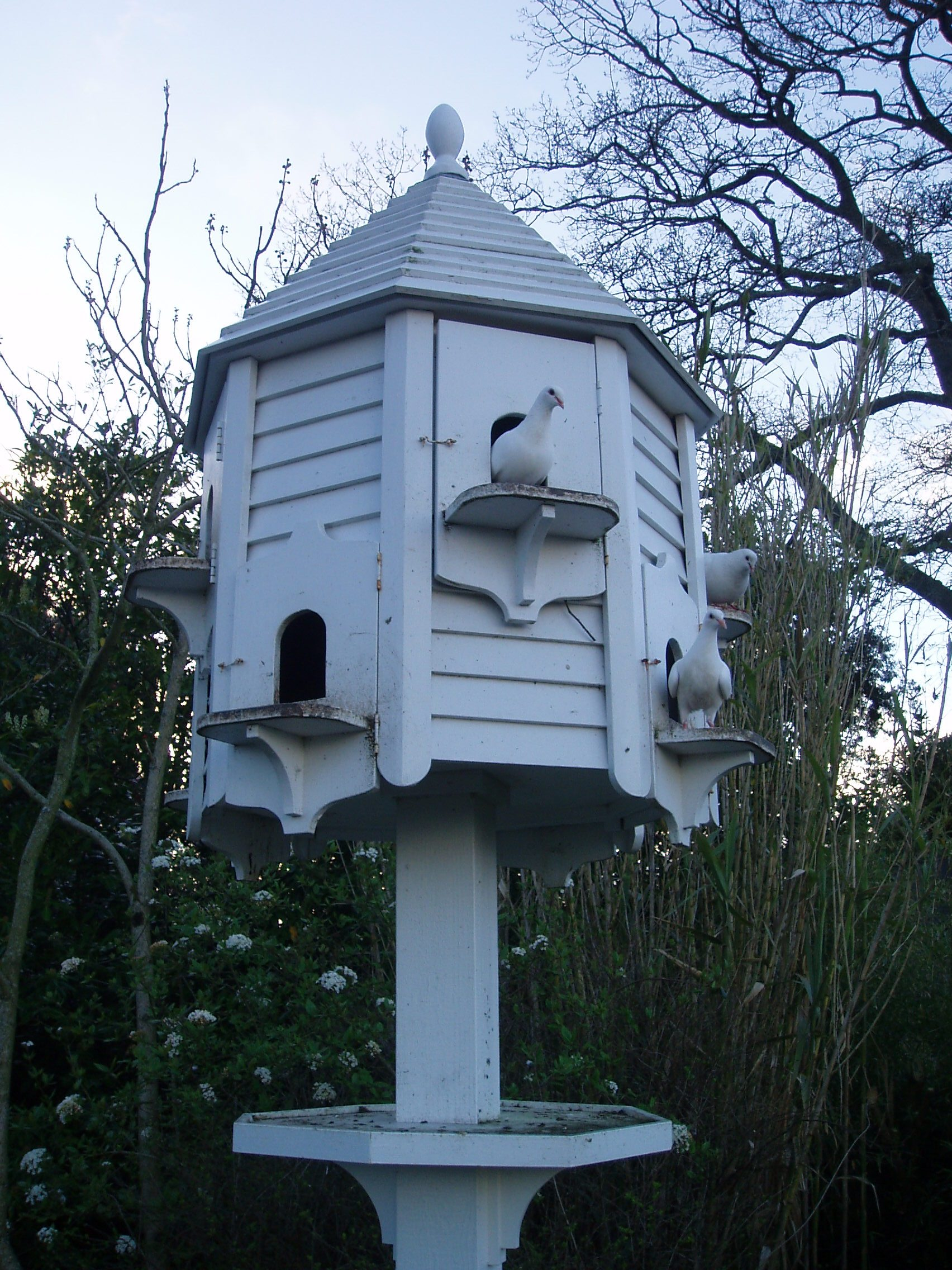
Small dovecote at the Lost Gardens of Heligan

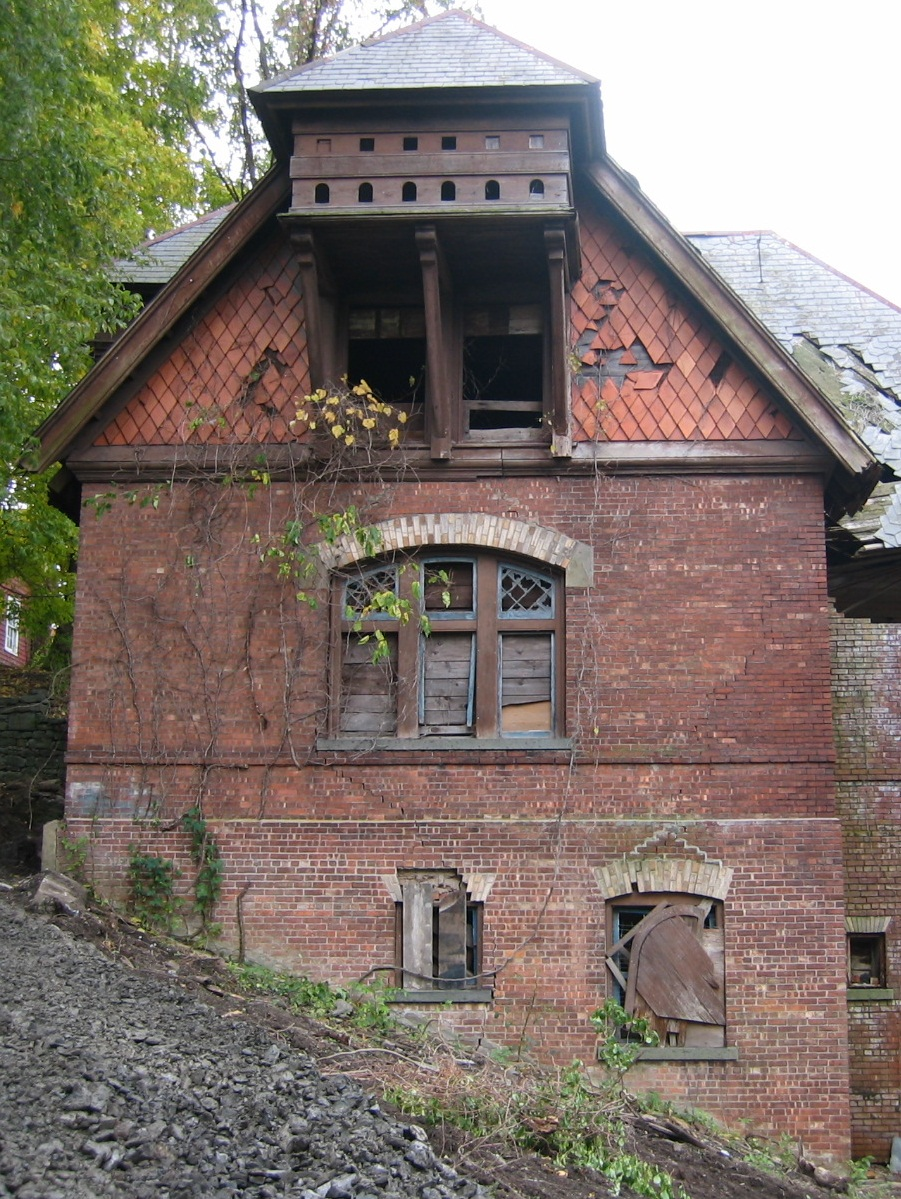
Hudson Valley dovecote in Saugerties, New York

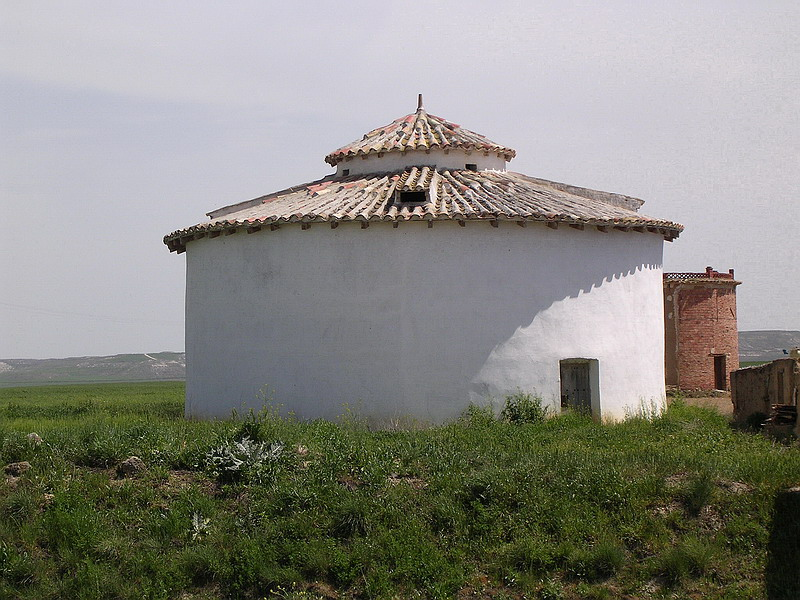
Palomar (dovecote) in Tierra de Campos, Spain

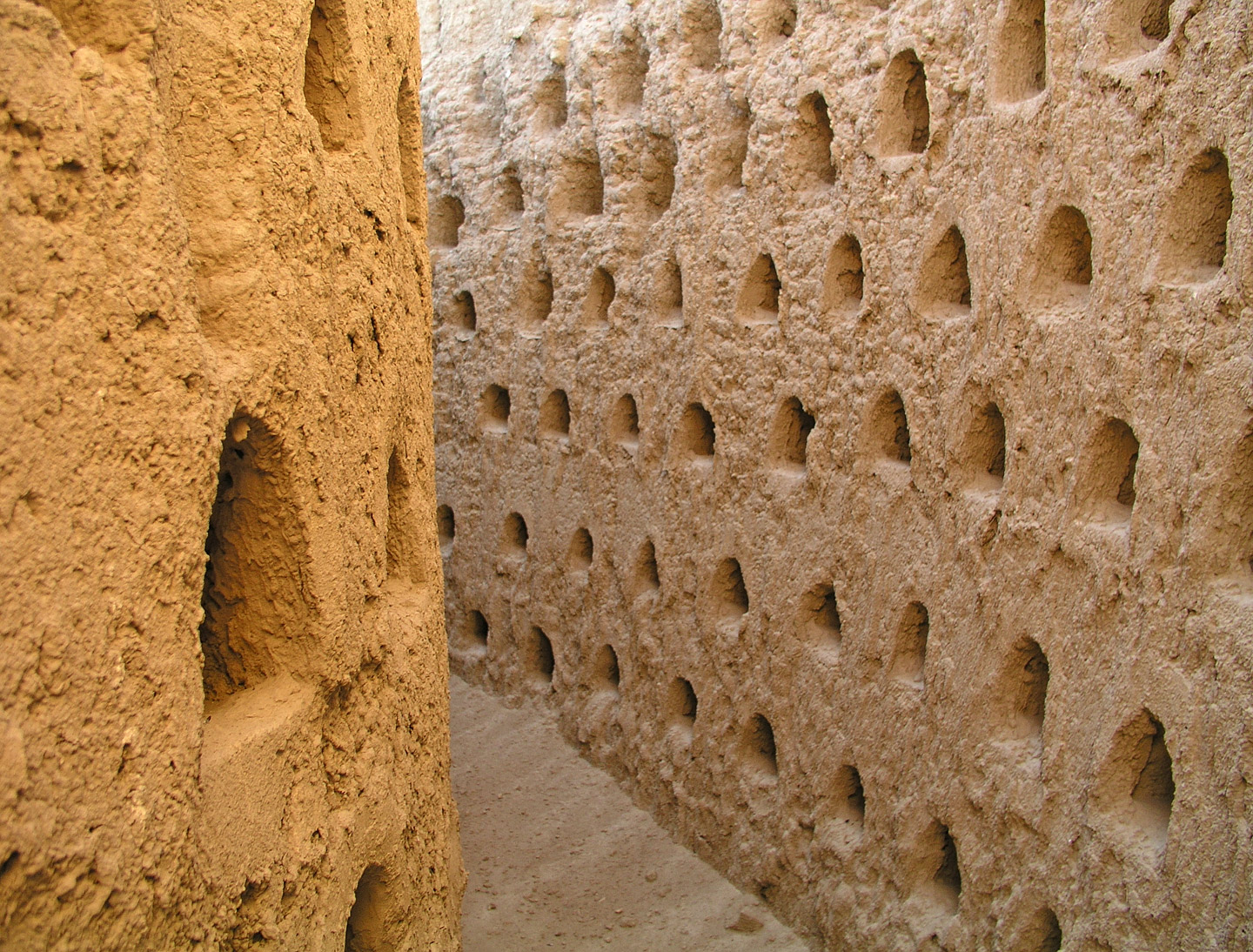
Nesting holes on inside walls of an old dovecote, Palazuelo de Vedija (Tierra de Campos), Spain

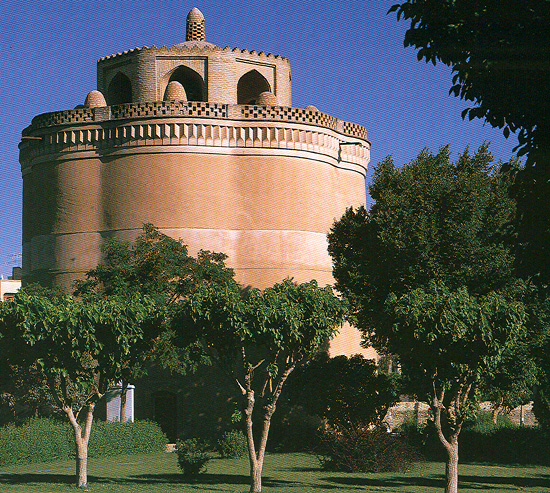
A Kaftar khooneh (lit. pigeon house) in Isfahan, Iran.

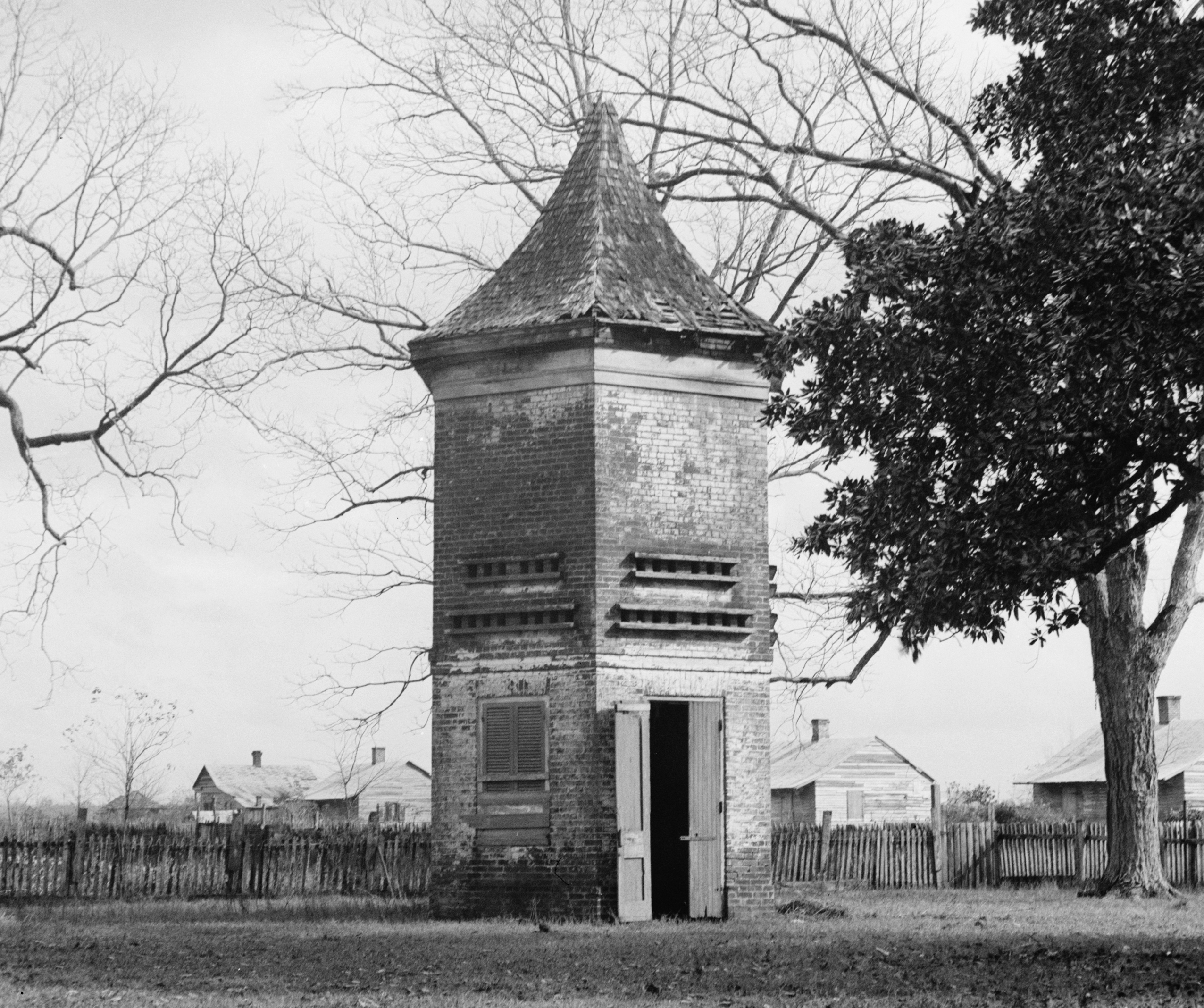
Hexagonal pigeonnier with a pointed roof at Uncle Sam Plantation near Convent, Louisiana

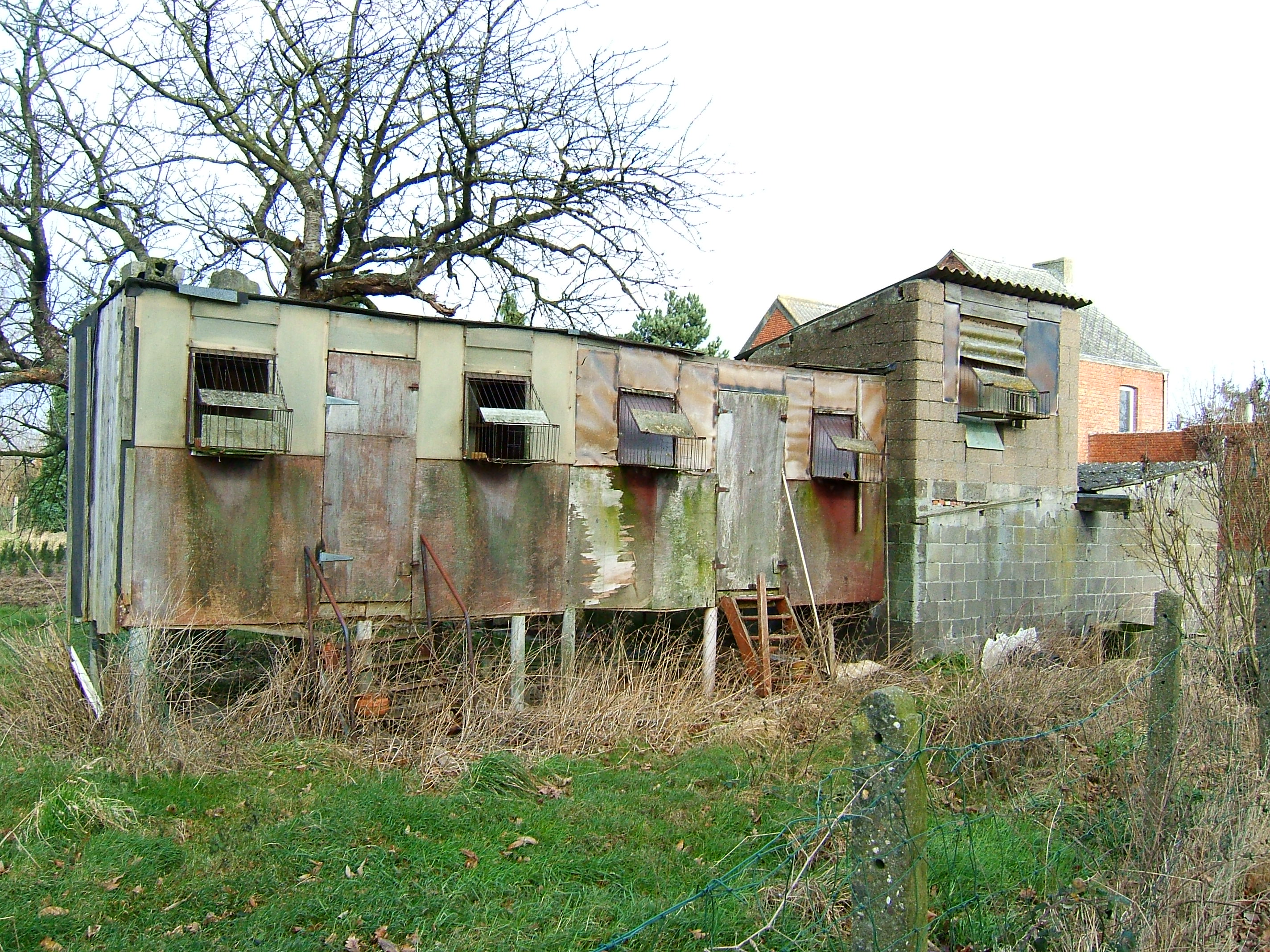
A (derelict) dovecot in Zemst, Belgium

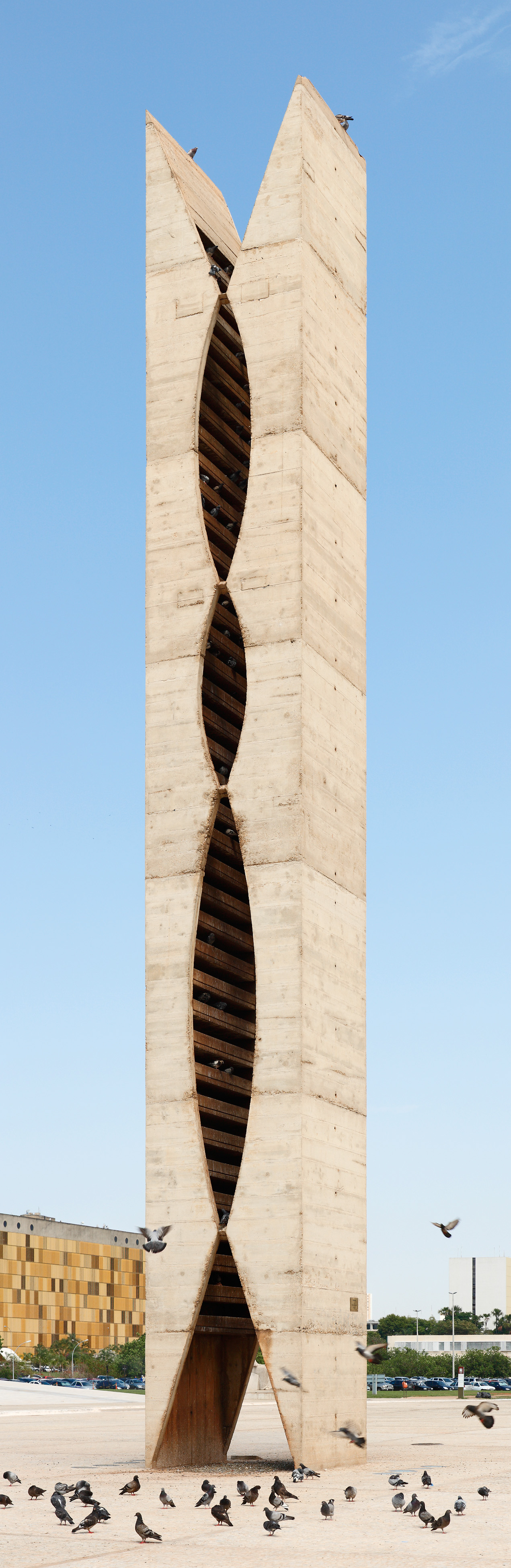
Modern dovecote designed by Oscar Niemeyer and located on the Praça dos Três Poderes (Three Powers Plaza) in Brasília, Brazil

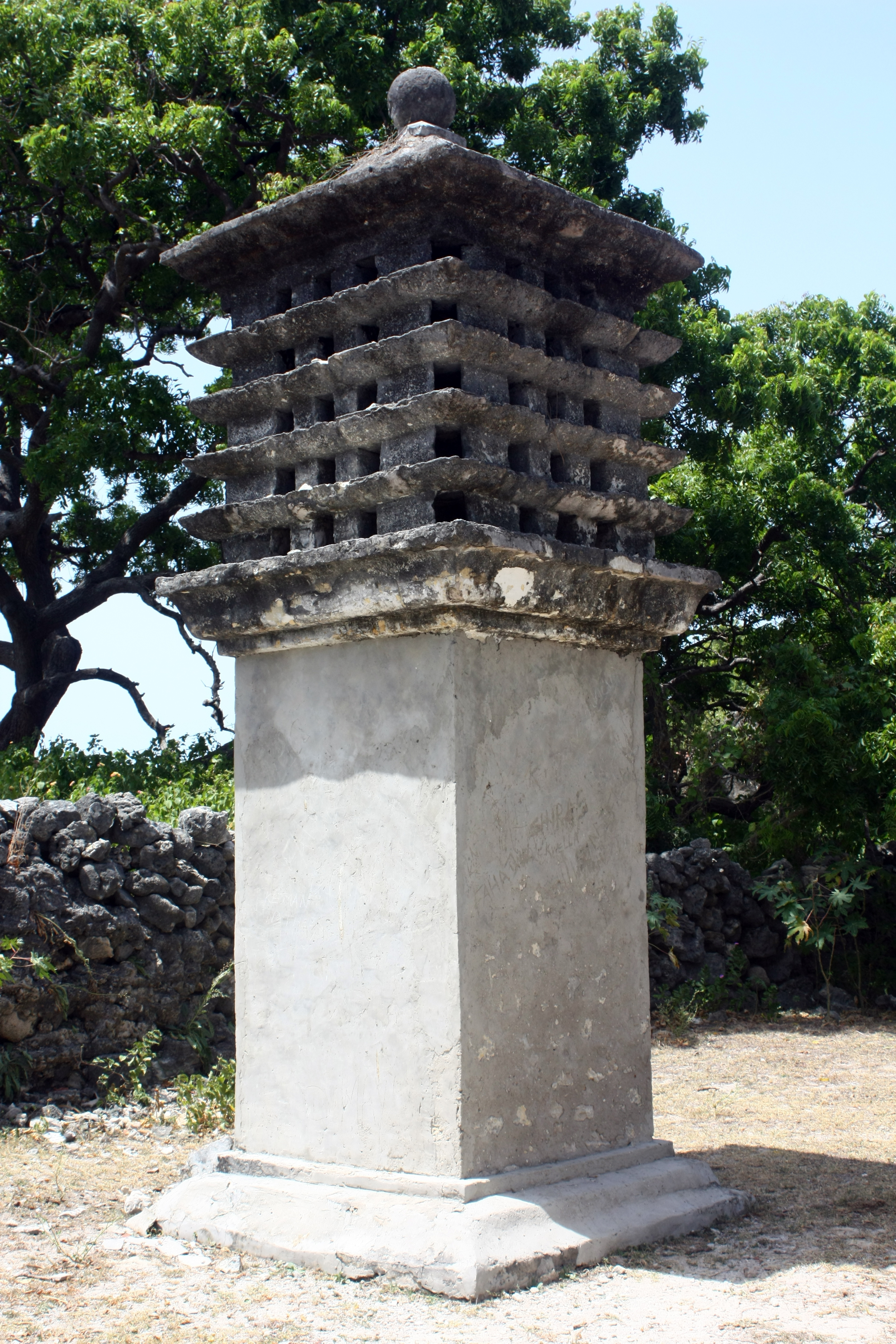
Pigeon house in Neduntheevu, used by colonial powers (Portuguese, Dutch or British during their rule in Sri Lanka)

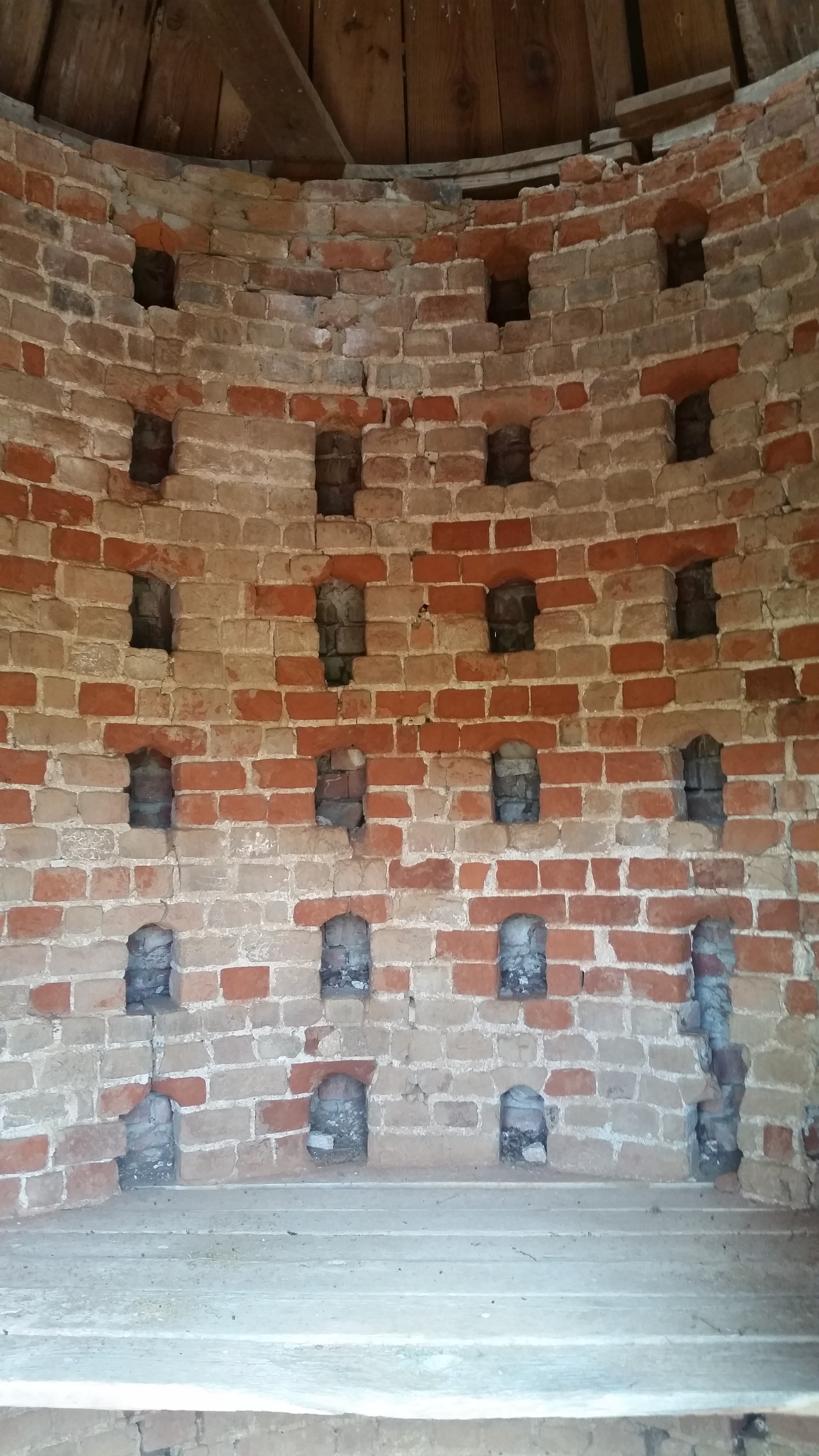
Shirley Plantation dovecote interior

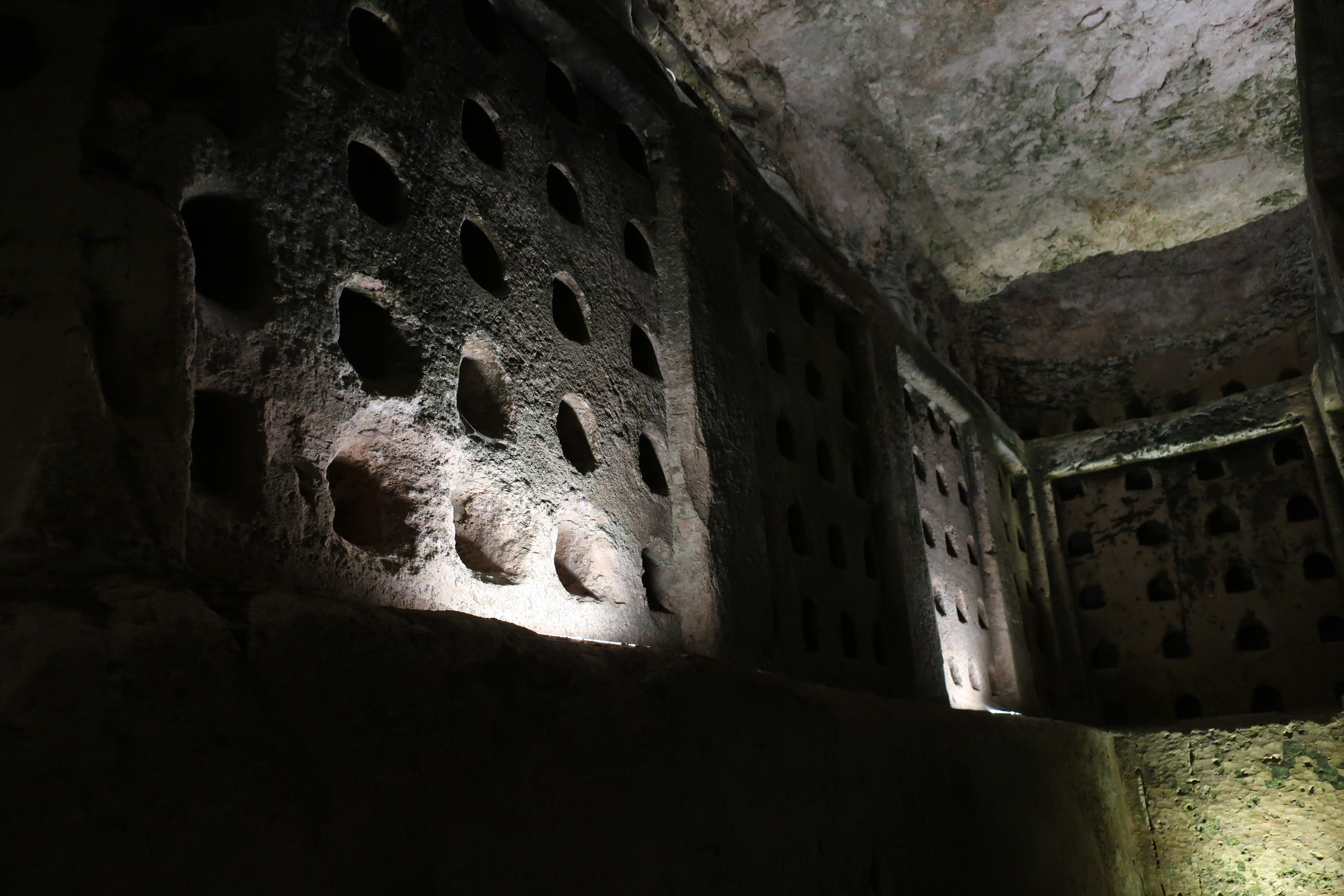
Columbarium (dovecote) interior wall at Maresha, Israel

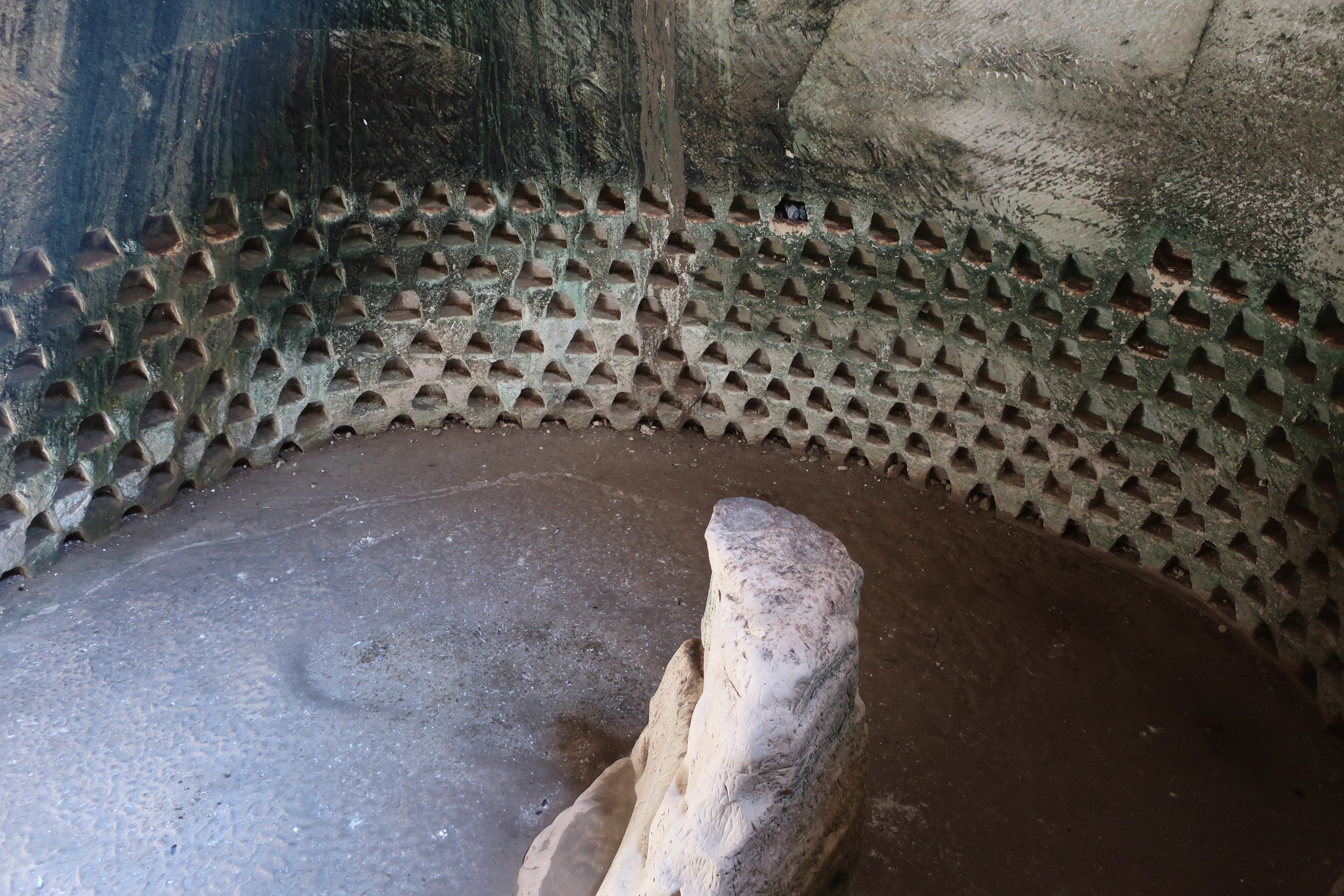
Columbarium at Tell Maresha (Khirbet es Sandahannah) in Israel

== See also ==
- Chabutro
- Columbarium – repository of cinerary urns, the word originally denoted a dovecote
- Culverhouse – old English for dovecote
- Cunninghamhead – An example of a small doocot
- Museum of Scottish Country Life – An example of a doocot on a cart shed
- Pigeonhole principle
- Pigeon keeping
- Pigeon racing – More on the sport
- Squab (food) – The meat from birds kept in a dovecote
