= List of saints of Scotland =

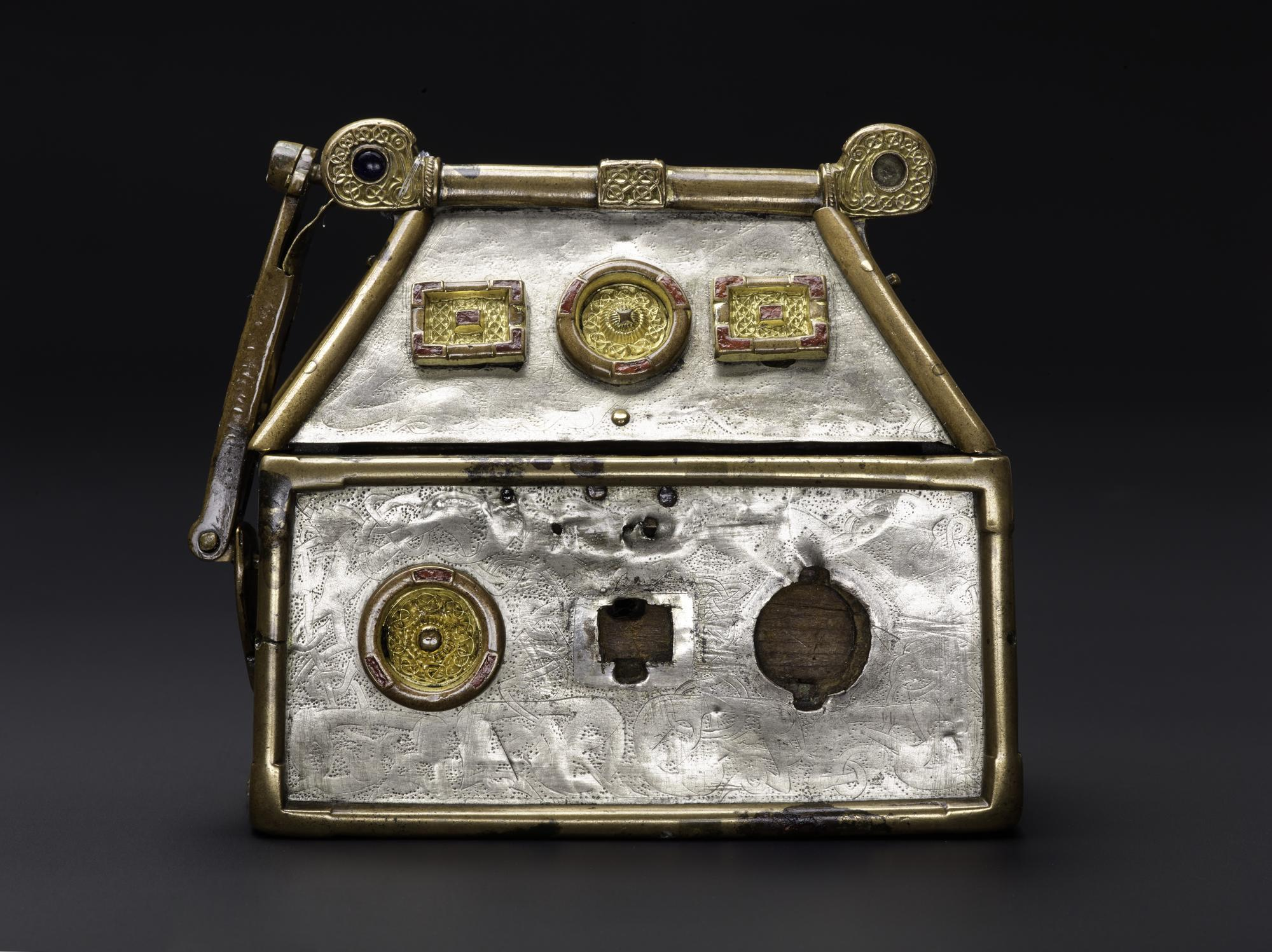
The Monymusk Reliquary, or Brecbennoch, dates from c. 750, and purportedly enclosed bones of Columba

This is a list of saints of Scotland, which includes saints from Scotland, associated with, or particularly venerated in the Kingdom of Scotland.

One of the main features of Medieval Scotland was the Veneration of Saints. Saints of Irish origin who were particularly revered included various figures called St. Fælan and St. Colman, and saints Findbarr and Finan. Columba remained a major figure into the fourteenth century and a new foundation at the site of his bones was endowed by William I (r. 1165–1214) at Arbroath Abbey. In Strathclyde the most important saint was St. Kentigern, whose cult (under the pet name St. Mungo) became focused in Glasgow. In Lothian it was St. Cuthbert, whose relics were carried across Northumbria after Lindisfarne was sacked by the Vikings before being installed in Durham Cathedral. After his martyrdom around 1115, a cult emerged in Orkney, Shetland and northern Scotland around Magnus Erlendsson, Earl of Orkney.

== Veneration of Saint Andrew ==
St Andrew is the patron saint of Scotland and has a long history of veneration there. The cult of St Andrew was established on the east coast at Kilrymont by the Pictish kings as early as the eighth century. The shrine, which from the twelfth century was said to have contained the relics of the saint brought to Scotland by Saint Regulus.

== Developments in the Early Middle Ages ==
By the twelfth century it had become known simply as St. Andrews and it became increasingly associated with Scottish national identity and the royal family. Queen Margaret was canonised in 1250 and after the ceremonial transfer of her remains to Dunfermline Abbey emerged as one of the most revered national saints. In the late medieval period, as the doctrine of Purgatory gained in importance in the period, the number of chapelries, priests and masses for the dead within them grew rapidly, along with the number of altars to saints, with St. Mary's in Dundee having perhaps 48 and St Giles' in Edinburgh over 50, as did the number of saints celebrated in Scotland, with about 90 being added to the missal used in St Nicholas church in Aberdeen.

== Impact of the Reformation ==
The Reformation made the veneration of saints illegal and removed almost all evidence of saints and shrines from churches, although Catholicism continued as a minority religion. The period created only one Catholic saint, the convert and martyr John Ogilvie (1569–1615).

== List of Saints ==
A

- Adomnán
- Adrian of May
- Almus
- Andrew the Apostle

B

- Barvitus
- Blane
- Saint Findbarr of Barra

C

- Cainnech of Aghaboe
- Cathan
- Cathróe (bishop of the Scots)
- Colman
- Columba
- Conran of Orkney
- Constantine of Strathclyde
- Conval
- Curetán
- Cuthbert

D

- David I of Scotland
- Donald of Ogilvy
- Donnán of Eigg
- Dotto
- Drostan
- Duthac

E

- Magnus
- Ernan

F

- Fergus
- Finan of Lindisfarne
- Fillan of Pittenweem
- Fillan
- Finbarr of Cork

G

- Gervadius
- Gilbert de Moravia

H

- Himelin

I

- Inan

K

- Kessog
- Ronald of Orkney

L

- Ludan

M

- Machan
- Machar
- Máel Ruba
- Saint Margaret of Scotland
- Marnock
- Medan
- Mirin
- Modan
- Molaise of Leighlin
- Moluag
- Monan
- Mungo
- Munn

N

- Nathalan
- Ninian

O

- Oda
- Odran of Iona
- John Ogilvie

P

- Psalmodius

R

- Regulus
- Rufus

S

- Serf

T

- Teneu
- Ternan
- Triduana

W

- Wendelin of Trier
- William of Perth

== See also ==
- Catholic Church in England
