= Fillan of Pittenweem =

Saint Fillan of Pittenweem

Ireland
- Born: c.695 Ireland
- Died: c.770 Strathfillan, Scotland
- Venerated in: Catholic Church
- Canonized: Pre-congregation
- Major shrine: St Fillan’s Cave, Pittenweem
- Feast: 20 June
- Influences: Relics associated with the Battle of Bannockburn tradition
- Tradition or genre: Celtic Christianity

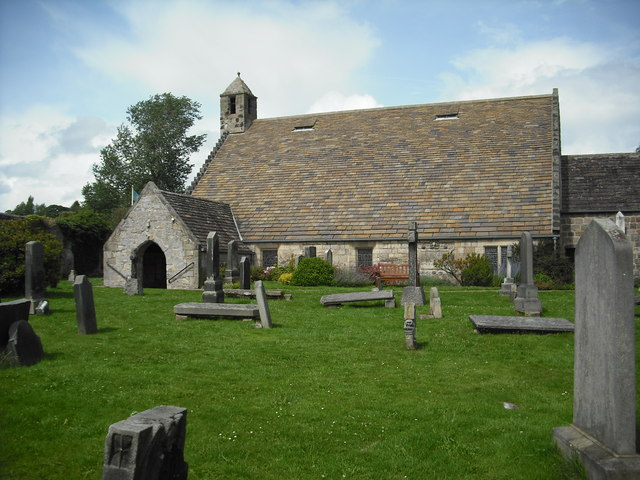
St Fillan's Church, Aberdour

Fillan of Pittenweem (or Saint Fillan of Pittenweem; c.695–c.770), not to be confused with the later Fillan of Munster who settled at Strath Fillan, was an early medieval Irish missionary, monk, and hermit associated with spreading Christianity in Scotland, particularly in Fife and the surrounding regions. He is traditionally believed to have been born in Ireland, the son of Feriach and Saint Kentigerna, and to have travelled to Scotland where he evangelized and later lived as a hermit in a cave at Pittenweem. According to legend, he wrote his sermons in the darkness of his cave with the aid of a luminous left arm given by divine grace, a tale that endures in local folklore.

Fillan of Pittenweem worked in Aberdour (where the parish church bears his name) and in Forgan. On the top of Dunfillan, near Comrie, was a rocky seat where, according to tradition, Fillan sat and gave his blessing to the surrounding country. Up until the eighteenth century, there was a belief that sitting there could be beneficial for rheumatism of the back. A stone basin at the bottom of the hill was known as "Fillan's Spring", whose water was said to cure sore eyes.

According to historian and antiquary William Forbes Skene, the village of St Fillans, on the eastern end of Loch Earn, takes its name from him. Stories of his relics being carried before the Scottish army at the Battle of Bannockburn are part of later medieval tradition, and his feast day is observed on 20 June.

Fillan of Pittenweem died at the disert of Tyrie near Kinghorn

== St Fillan's Cave ==
St Fillan's Cave, situated in Cove Wynd, Pittenweem, has long been associated with Fillan. The cave has flat rocks that are presumed to have been used as beds, a small spring of "holy water" at its rear, and a well. The cave was a stopping off point for pilgrims on their way to St Andrews or the Ethernan shrine on the Isle of May.

St Fillan's Cave showing stairwell up to priory grounds

Antiquarian Robert Sibbald says that in 1100, Edgar, King of Scotland gave Pittenweem to the Culdees. Later, David I of Scotland granted the monks of the Priory of St. Mary the Virgin on the Isle of May the manor of Pittenweem, where they erected the Priory of St. Adrian over the ancient cave associated with Saint Fillan. A stairway was built by the monks of the priory from the cave, ending in a vaulted cellar in the Priory grounds.

Smugglers also used the cave for some time and as a storeroom for local fisherfolk (Pittenweem has been a fishing village since the time of early Christian settlement, and later a harbour was constructed). It served as a prison during the witch hunts of the 17th and 18th centuries and was used as a rubbish tip, which probably led to its disappearance for some time.

The cave was rediscovered about 1900 when a horse ploughing in the Priory garden fell down a hole into it. It was rededicated as a place of worship by the Bishop of St. Andrews in 1935.

It has since been refurbished and opened to visitors as of October 2000, and is owned by the Bishop Low Trust. It is entrusted to St John's Scottish Episcopal Church in Pittenweem, and is open to the public.

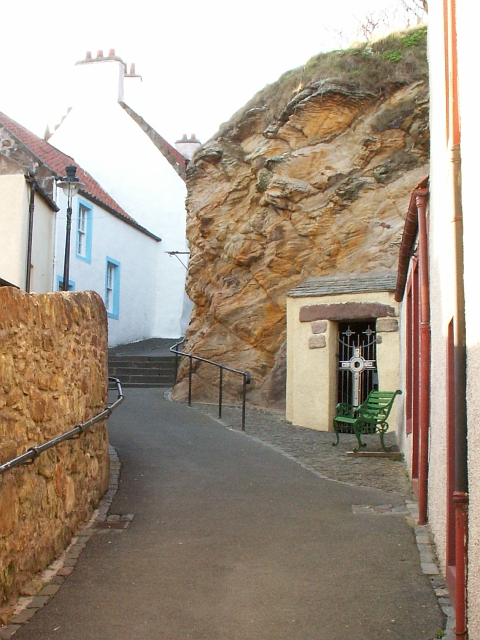
Cove Wynd and St Fillan's Cave

St Fillan's Cave showing internal structure and altar.

== See also ==
- Pittenweem Priory
