= Prior of May (Pittenweem) =

The Prior of May then Prior of Pittenweem (later Commendator of Pittenweem) was the religious superior of the Benedictine monks of Isle of May Priory, which later moved to the mainland became called Pittenweem Priory. The priory was originally based on the Isle of May, but was moved by 1318 to its nearby mainland site of Pittenweem, Fife, passing from the overlordship of Reading Abbey (Benedictine) to St Andrews Cathedral Priory (Augustinian). The following is a list of priors and commendators:

== List of priors ==
- Achard, 1141x1150
- Robert, 1161 x 1162-1165 x 1166
- William, 1166x1171
- Hugh de Mortimer, 1198–1205
- John, 1206–1215
- Richard, 1221–1222
- Radulf, 1233
- John, 1248-1251
- William, 1251 x 1260
- Hugh, 1260–1269
- William de Gloucester, 1269–1270
- Thomas de Houburn, x 1306
- Jordan, 1309
- Martin, 1313–1318
- Adam de Pilmor, 1345
- Robert de Anderston, c. 1380
- Robert de Leuchars, 1405
- William Nory, 1402–1408; 1409-1419 x 1421
- James de Haldeston, 1407-1418
- John Litstar, 1418
- Thomas de Camera (Chalmers), 1419 x 1421-1447
- William Stury, 1421
- James Kennedy, 1447-1465
- Walter Monypenny, 1465-1467
  - John Woodman, 1465-1477
- Patrick Graham, 1466-1478
- Walter Davidson, 1477–1479, 1489
- Thomas Kymner, 1486
- William Scheves, 1487-1497

== List of commendators ==
- Andrew Forman, 1495-1515 x 1521
- Robert Forman, 1516–1526
- John Roul, 1525–1553
- Adam Blackadder, 1531
- John de Moncreif, 1550–1551
- James Stewart, 1550-1567
- Sir James Balfour of Pittendreich, 1567–1573
- James Haliburton, 1575–1583
- William Stewart of Houston, 1583-1603 x 1605

== See also ==
- Isle of May Priory
- Pittenweem Priory
- Adrian of May

== Bibliography ==
- Cowan, Ian B. & Easson, David E., Medieval Religious Houses: Scotland With an Appendix on the Houses in the Isle of Man, Second edition, (London, 1976), pp. 94–5
- Watt, D. E. R. & Shead, N .F. (eds.), The Heads of Religious Houses in Scotland from the 12th to the 16th Centuries, The Scottish Records Society, New Series, Volume 24, (Edinburgh, 2001), pp. 143–9
