= Pittenweem Priory =

Former Augustinian priory located in Pittenweem, Fife, Scotland

Coordinates: 56.2139°N 2.7275°W

Pittenweem Priory was an Augustinian priory located in the village of Pittenweem, Fife, Scotland.

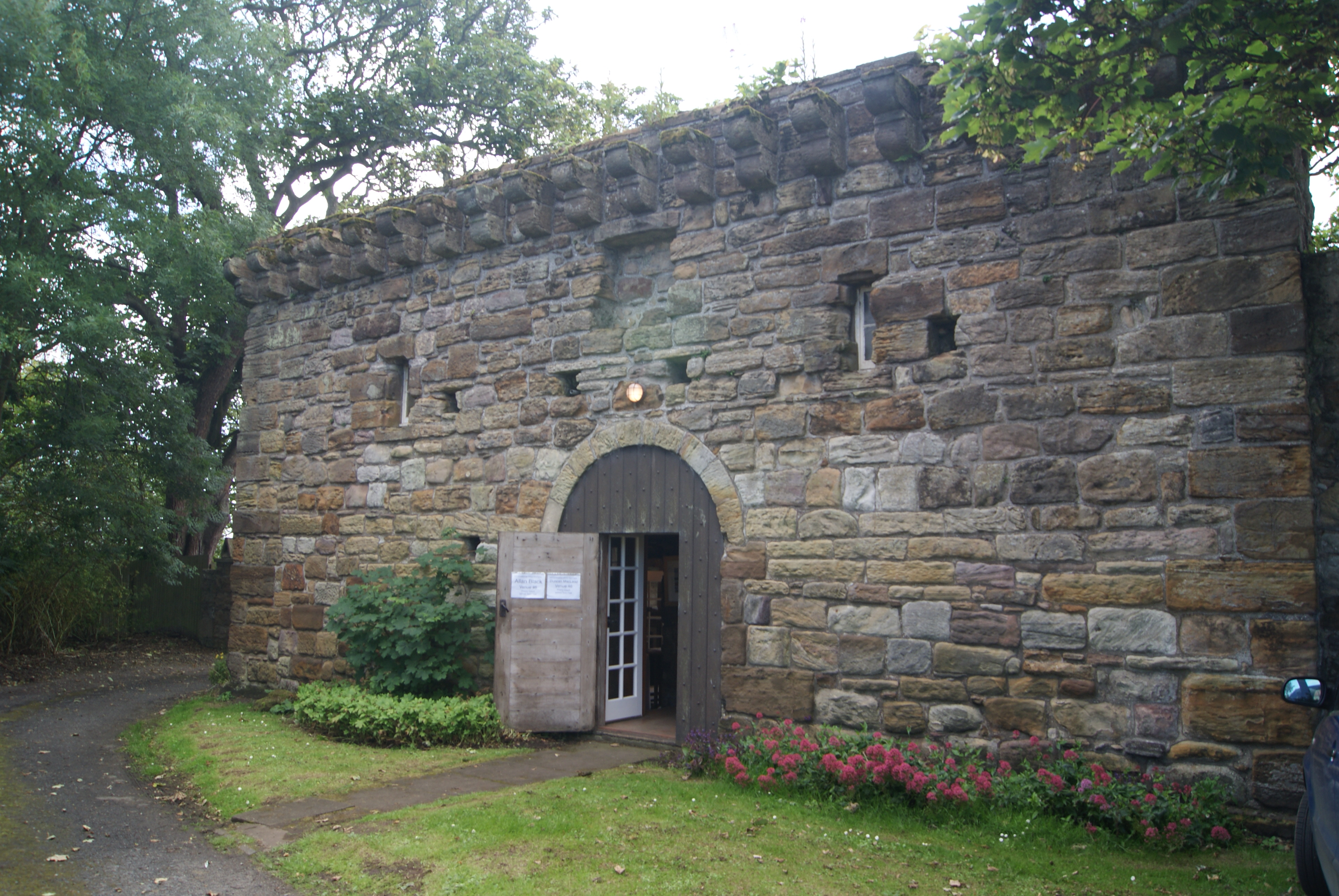
The fortified east gatehouse in 2015

== History ==
The 6th century religious recluse St Monan is believed to have lived at a monastery at Pittenweem before leaving to take up residence in a small cave at Inverey. Antiquarian Robert Sibbald says that in 1100, Edgar, King of Scotland gave Pittenweem to the Culdees.

Around 1145, Benedictines from Reading Abbey founded the Priory of St. Mary the Virgin on the Isle of May. David I of Scotland granted the monks the manor of Pittenweem, where they erected a priory over the ancient sacred cave associated with Saint Fillan. It was a stopping off point for pilgrims on their way to St Andrews or St. Ethernan's shrine on the Isle of May.

Due to raiding parties from Orkney, the relative isolation of the community, and privations due to the difficulty of securing supplies, in 1288, Reading sold the Isle of May priory to the Bishop of St. Andrews, who gave it the canons of St Andrews Cathedral Priory. With the severing of ties with Reading, Pittenweem became their chief seat. It was less exposed to incursions by the English, nearer to the superior house at St. Andrews, and could be reached without the necessity of a precarious passage by sea. In 1318, the canons on the Isle of May relocated to Pittenweem.

The cave, which is fitted out as a chapel, was rededicated as a place of worship by the Bishop of St. Andrews in 1935.

The present Church of Scotland parish kirk is on the site of the priory church. Much of the fortified east gatehouse of the priory survives (15th century), as does the 'Great House', one of Scotland's best-preserved late medieval houses, which may have served as living quarters for the prior and monks. It was designated a Category A listed building in 1972.

== See also ==
- Fillan of Pittenweem
- Prior of Pittenweem
