= Bogward Dovecot =

Historic building in St Andrews, Fife, Scotland

Coordinates: 56°19′48″N 2°49′24″W

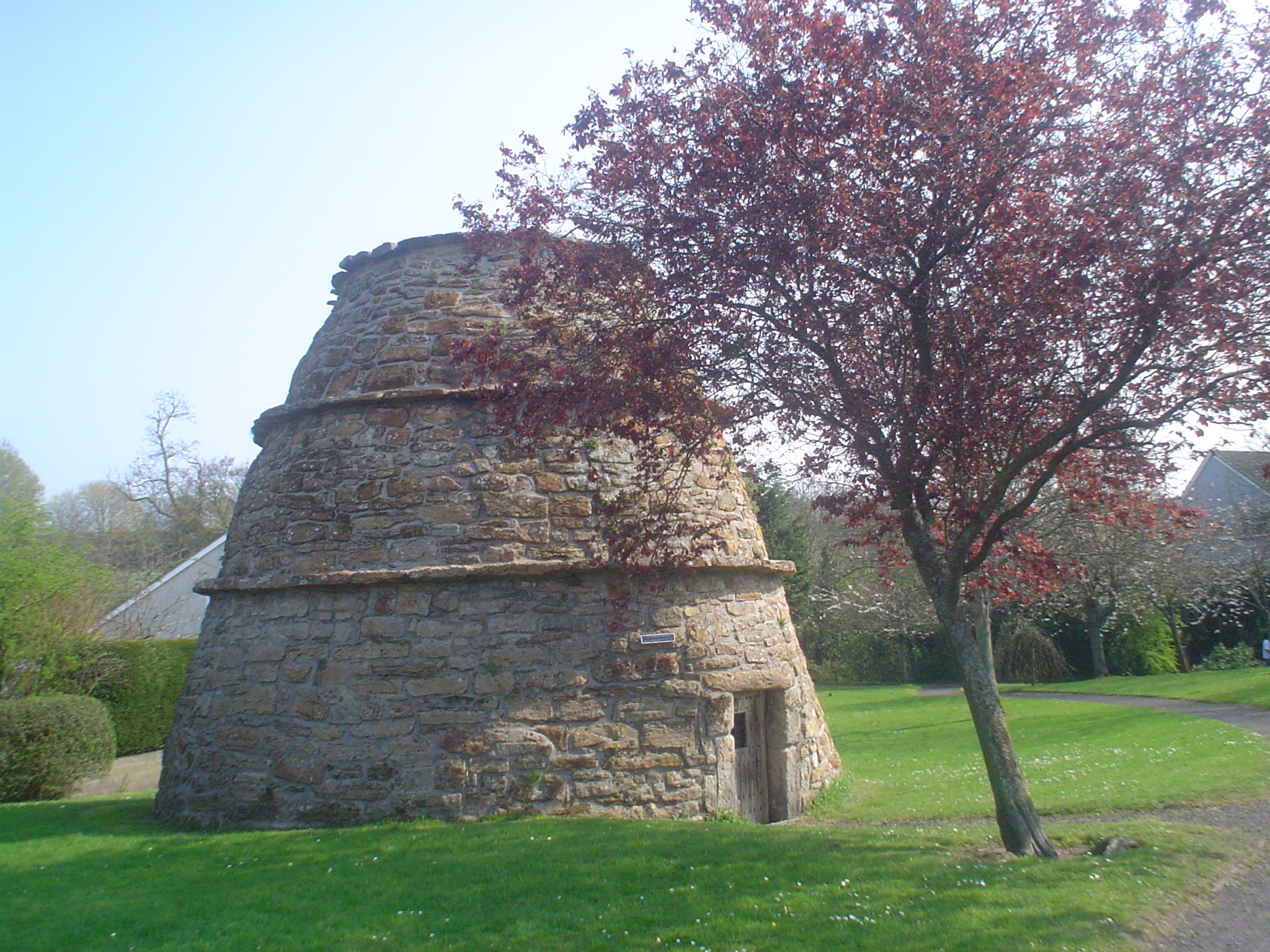
Bogward Dovecote

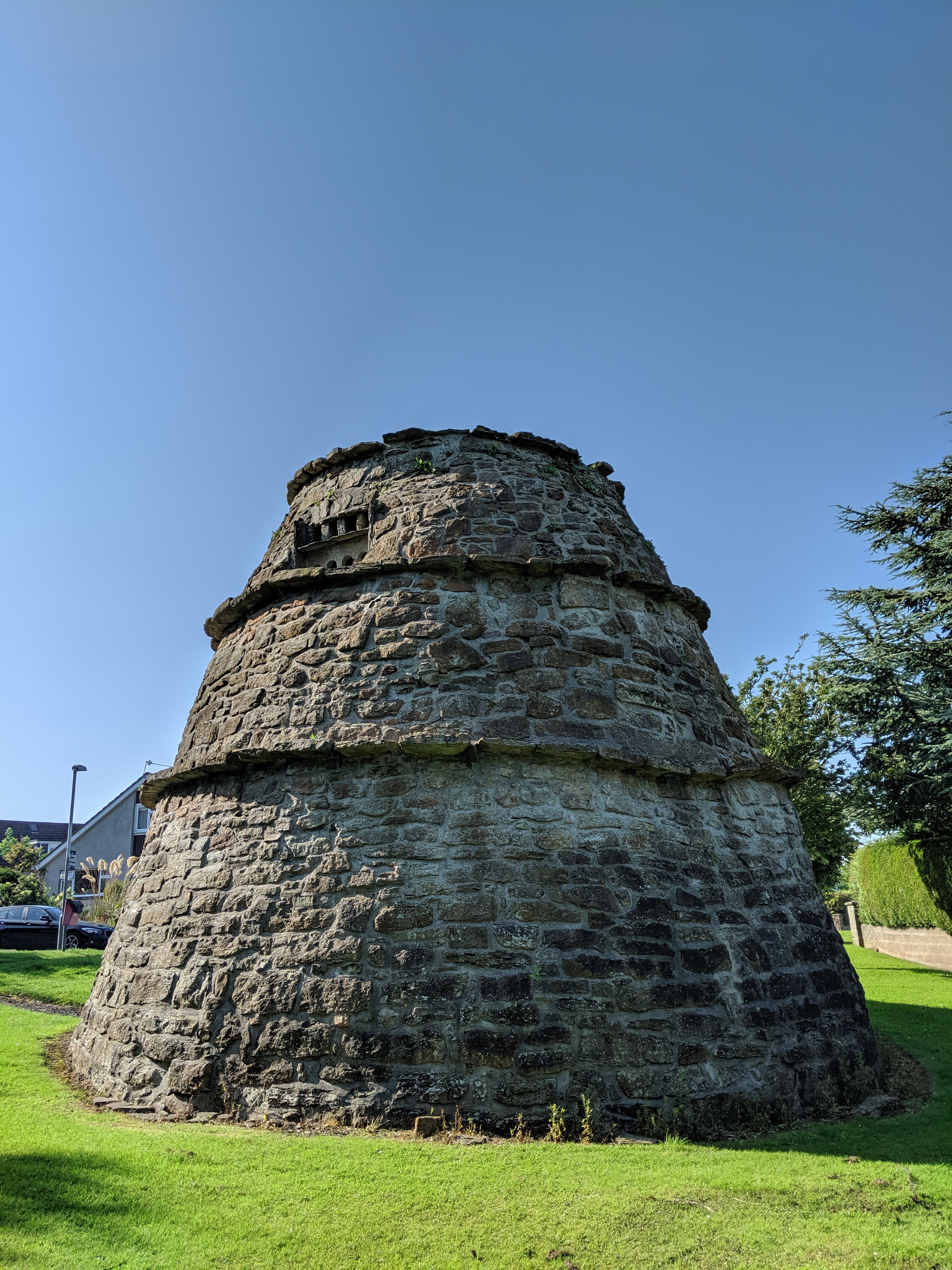
View of the dovecote, looking NNW. Holes for pigeons to enter are visible above the middle rat-course.

Bogward Doocot is a rare early beehive-type doocot, or dovecote, in the Scottish town of St Andrews, Fife. In 1971, it was designated as a Category A listed building by Historic Scotland.

== History ==
The doocot was most likely built in the early to mid-16th century. RCAHMS notes from 1956 describe the building as being in 'good condition', despite the roof having collapsed. Management of the building was passed to the St Andrews Preservation Trust in 1960, following which the roof was repaired, and the door replaced.

The doocot was originally owned by the Priory of St Andrews, which benefited from both the meat and eggs of the resident pigeons, as well as their accumulated manure, which was used as a natural lime-rich fertilizer.

== Description ==
The doocot is located to the west of St Andrews, on Doocot Road, which was named after the structure. It contains three rat-courses, used to prevent rats from climbing the doocot and stealing eggs. Birds may use the upper rat-course as a ledge when entering the doocot. A wooden door at the base of the structure allows entry to its interior, where there is a rotating ladder, giving access to the nesting boxes at the top.
