= St Andrews Cathedral Priory =

Priory in Fife, Scotland

Coordinates: 56.3394°N 2.7875°W

St Andrews Cathedral Priory was a priory of Augustinian canons in St Andrews, Fife, Scotland. It was one of the great religious houses in Scotland, and instrumental in the founding of the University of St Andrews.

== History ==
Plans were made for its foundation in the reign of Alexander I of Scotland, who set aside some land (in the area known as the Cursus Apri, or "Boar's Raik") for that purpose. It was finally established by King David I and his son in 1140 with Augustinian canons from Nostell Priory, West Yorkshire. For some time the canons and the Culdees of nearby Kilrymont monastery served the church together. The Culdees, headed by an abbot, served a side altar in the Cathedral throughout the twelfth century and into the thirteenth century, while the Augustinians, as the main clergy of the cathedral, served the main altar. It is probable that the bishop intended that the Culdees would become Augustinians; however, although a papal bull of 1147 ordered that upon the death of each Culdee an Augustinian should take his place, they were still there in 1199 when the priory recognised their holdings to be permanent. By 1250, those Culdees who declined to become Augustinians moved to the Church of St Mary on the Rock at Kilrymont.

The canons managed the shrine of St Andrew, and the adjacent cathedral functioned as their monastery church. They also established a hospital. Twenty-four canons died in 1349, when the black plague came to St. Andrews. Later lay-priors or commendatories were introduced; relaxations and irregularities crept in. Instigated by the fiery preaching of John Knox, his followers ransacked the cathedral and the priory.

== Holdings ==
The priory, like all the great monasteries, had a number of dependent establishments:

- St Serf's Inch Priory - a Culdee establishment dating from 838, converted to an Augustinian priory linked to St Andrews Cathedral Priory at the instigation of King David I of Scotland in 1150.
- Monymusk Priory - founded by Gille Críst, Mormaer of Mar, in the last decade of the 12th century, There were Culdees there, who retained many of their rights. The transformation of the Culdee community into an Augustinian priory was complete by 1245 at the latest.
- Isle of May Priory - originally a Benedictine priory dedicated to St. Mary the Virgin, with a shrine to Adrian of May. Subjected to raiding parties of Scandinavians from Orkney, the privations and isolation of the location finally led the monks of Reading Abbey to sell the island in 1288 to Bishop William Fraser, who gave it the canons of St. Andrews.
- Pittenweem Priory - founded in the early 12th century for Augustine canons. In 1318, the Augustinians from the Isle of May Priory relocated to Pittenweem.
- Portmoak Chapel - a chapel of the Culdees, dedicated to St. Monan. The chapel is identified with St Moak (an alternative name for St Monan) who gave his name to the area. About 1150 King David passed the Priory on St Serf’s Island and the chapel at Portmoak to the Augustinian regular of St. Andrews.

The priory lands were carved up into lordships in the 16th century, although the core and title remained into the 17th century. The Priory of St Andrews also used to own the land now used by Rufflets Hotel, located between Strathkinness and St Andrews itself.

Portions of the east and south ranges of what was originally the cathedral's priory are preserved as the St Andrews Cathedral Museum. A remnant of the wall relating to the priory's guest house remains. The Pends is a mid 14th century large stone gatehouse of the priory and was the main entrance. The site is protected, together with St Andrews Cathedral, as a scheduled monument.

== University of St Andrews ==
Around Whitsuntide 1410 a school of higher studies was established at St Andrews by Prior James Biset. A group of Augustinians, driven from the University of Paris by the Avignon schism and from the universities of Oxford and Cambridge by the Anglo-Scottish Wars, formed a society of higher learning in St Andrews, which offered courses of lectures in divinity, logic, philosophy, and law. A charter of privilege was bestowed upon the society of masters and scholars by the Bishop of St Andrews, Henry Wardlaw.

== See also ==
- Prior of St Andrews, for a list of priors and commendators

== Bibliography ==
- Butler, D. Scottish Cathedrals and Abbeys, The Guild Library, A&C Black, 1901, pp. 123-4
- Duncan, A.A.M., "The Foundation of St Andrews Cathedral Priory, 1140", in The Scottish Historical Review, vol 84, (April, 2005), pp. 1–37
- Watt, D.E.R. & Shead, N.F. (eds.), The Heads of Religious Houses in Scotland from the 12th to the 16th Centuries, The Scottish Records Society, New Series, Volume 24, (Edinburgh, 2001), pp. 187–92
