= Rufflets Hotel =

Country house hotel in Fife, Scotland

Rufflets Country House Hotel
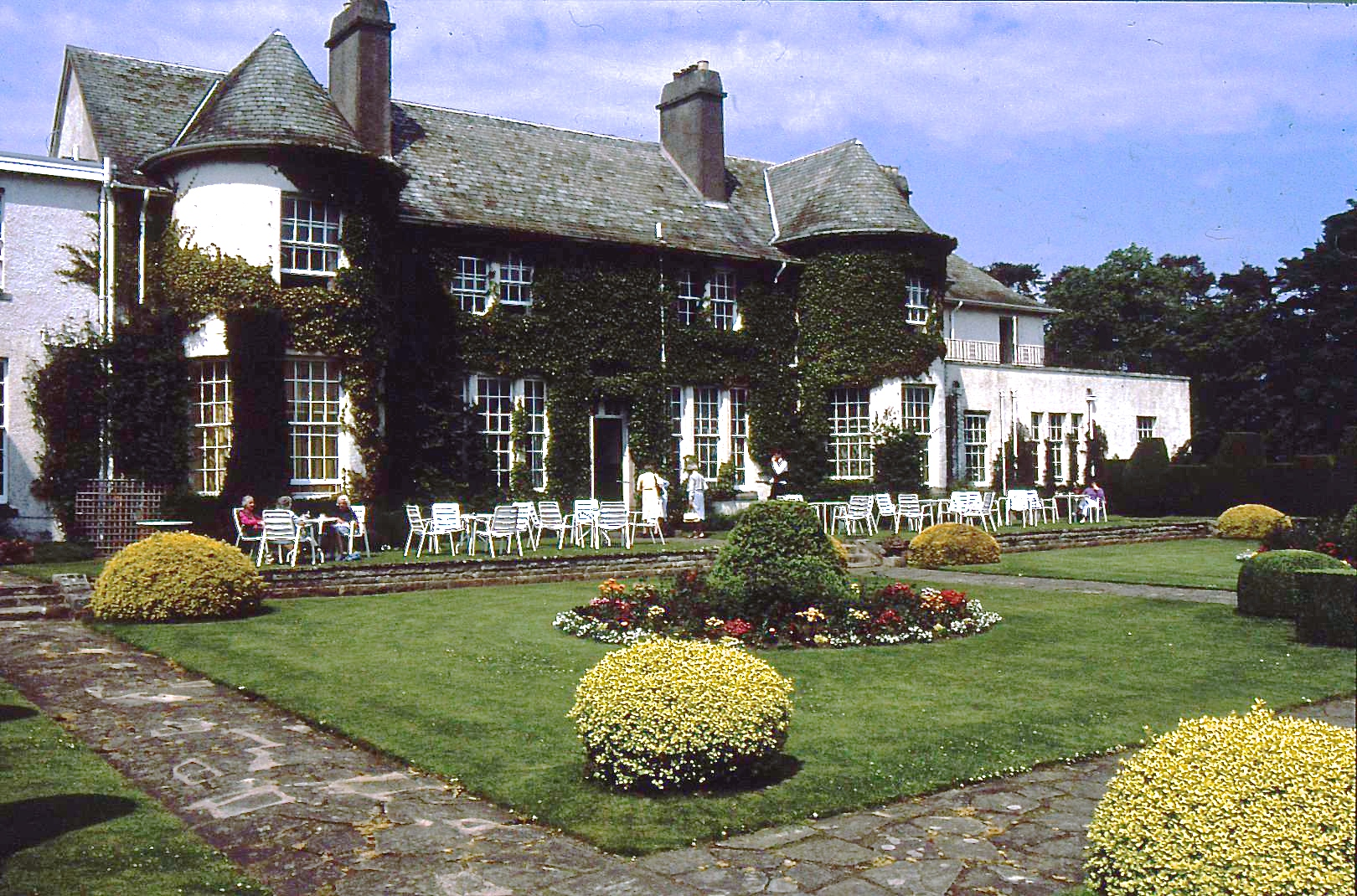
- Interactive map of the Rufflets Country House Hotel area

General information
- Location: Strathkinness Low Road; St. Andrews, Fife, Scotland; KY16 9TX
- Coordinates: 56.3336°N 2.8404°W
- Opening: 1952

Other information
- Number of rooms: 24
- Number of suites: 2
- Number of restaurants: 1

Website
- Rufflets.co.uk

Rufflets Hotel is a 4-star hotel near St. Andrews, Fife, Scotland.

== History ==
=== Rufflets House 1924–1952 ===
Rufflets House itself was built in 1924 as a private home for Mrs Anne Brydon Gilroy, the widow of a prominent Dundee jute baron, and was designed by Dundee architect Donald Mills. Local records going back as far as 1642 indicate that the land was owned by the Priory of St Andrews as part of the Priory Acres and it was known as the "Ruch (pronounced "ruff") Flets", which in the Scots tongue, means "rough, flat lands".

=== Rufflets Hotel 1952 to date ===
The house was bought by George and Margaret Cook and Anna & James Meldrum in 1952 and turned into one of the UK's first country house hotels. The hotel is still in the same family and has been rated by The Automobile Association as one of the top 200 hotels in Britain since 1999.

The hotel has 10 acres (40,000 m^{2}) of grounds and is located 1-mile (1.6 km) from the centre of St Andrews, along the B939 road. The hotel has modern conference hosting facilities.

== Awards ==
Rufflets holds many awards including:

- Four AA Red Stars and Two AA Red Rosettes
- Four Gold Stars from Visit Scotland

== In the press ==
In August 2006 the hotel's restaurant received press coverage with the launch of cosmeceutical enhanced menu which the restaurant claims contains "ingredients known for their anti-aging properties to help diners to have longer, more youthful lives".

In February 2008 the hotel became Scotland's first carbon neutral hotel as part of a sustainable tourism drive.
