= John Smith (clockmaker) =

Scottish clockmaker (fl. 1770–1814)

John Smith (fl. 1770–1814) was a clockmaker who lived and worked in Pittenweem, Fife, Scotland.

His most famous clock is in the possession of the Duke of Buccleuch at Bowhill House, Selkirk. It is reported to have four dials and shows days of the week and days of the month. The clock can play eight old Scots tunes and every three hours initiates a procession where the Macer of the Lords of Council and Session appears, doffs his cap and then leads fifteen Lords in ceremonial robes across an opening, before re-appearing and replacing his cap. At midnight on Saturday, a plaque appears bearing the legend "Remember Sunday". On Sunday the clock neither strikes nor processes, resuming at midnight.

Other clocks made by John Smith are in the Royal Collection and the Manchester Historical Museum in Manchester-by-the-Sea, Massachusetts, as well as in private collections in the UK and overseas.

Smith's clocks were renowned for their high quality, and it was unusual for such a talented clockmaker to come from a small fishing village such as Pittenweem. An advertisement issued by himself in the year 1775 informs us that "he was bred in the trade and had never been out of the country."

John Smith occupied a fine house in the High Street, where he had his workshop on the first floor. He had several apprentices including John Boyd of Cupar and George Lumsden senior of Pittenweem. Smith died in Pittenweem on 11 April 1814 and is buried in the churchyard there along with his first wife, Helen Brown.
