= Isle of May Priory =

Monastery in Scotland

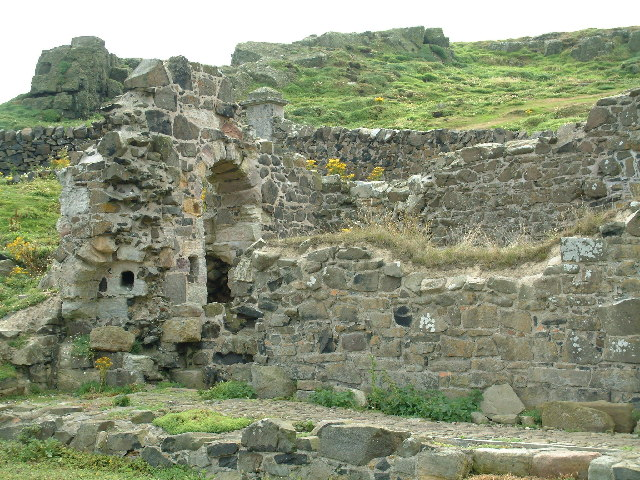
- Ruins of Isle of May Priory
- Interactive map of Isle of May Priory
- 56.18253°N 2.55128°W
- Location: Isle of May, Scotland
- OS grid reference: NT 65878 99014

Site notes
- Material: Stone
- Condition: Ruined
- Public access: Yes

Scheduled monument
- Official name: Isle of May Priory
- Designated: 18 July 1958
- Reference no.: SM838

The Isle of May Priory was a monastery and community of Benedictine monks established for 9 monks of Reading Abbey on the Isle of May in the Firth of Forth, Scotland, in 1153, under the patronage of David I of Scotland. The priory passed into the control of St Andrews Cathedral Priory in the later 13th century, and in 1318 the community relocated to Pittenweem Priory on the Fife coast.

The upstanding and excavated remains of the priory were listed as a scheduled monument in 1958.

== St. Adrian's Priory ==
Ethernan was a 7th-century Scottish monk martyred by the Picts around 669. Believed to be buried on there, the Isle of May became the centre of his cult. He was honoured in a number of places in Scotland; pilgrims came to the Isle of May to pray at his shrine for healing.

Adrian of May later built a monastery on the Isle of May, which likely consisted of a series of Irish-style beehive-shaped houses and a chapel. The island was a popular destination for pilgrims during the later Middle Ages. Around 875, marauding Vikings invaded the island and slaughtered the monks. The island was then abandoned for centuries.

At some point during the Middle Ages, Ethernan got conflated with Adrian of May, whose shrine attracted pilgrims for the next several centuries. His cult is most likely a misremembering of Ethernan from a time when the Picts had ceased to function as an ethnic group within Scotland and ancient martyrdoms in Britain and Ireland were commonly attributed to Vikings.

== Priory of St. Mary the Virgin ==
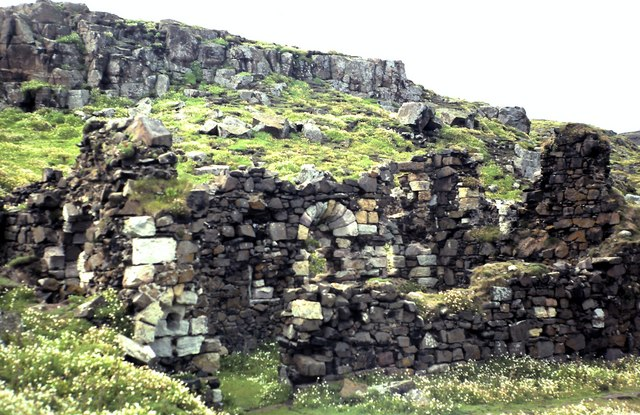
Priory of St. Mary the Virgin

In 1145, King David I of Scotland gave the island to Reading Abbey, (founded by his brother-in-law, Henry I of England) in Berkshire, England. The monks agreed to maintain nine priests on the island to pray for the souls of the Kings Of Scots. The English Benedictines erected a small monastery dedicated to St. Mary the Virgin, with a shrine to St. Ethernan. The King and his successors endowed the priory with many gifts.

Building was hampered due to raiding parties of Scandinavians who had settled in Orkney. The privations and isolation of the location finally led Reading Abbey to sell the property to the Bishop of St. Andrews in 1288, who gave it the canons of St. Andrews.

In the late thirteenth century, a jurisdictional dispute arose between the Bishop of St. Andrews and Reading over ownership of the island. When in 1313 the island was declared a part of the diocese of St. Andrews, English forces attacked the island and destroyed the monastery. A new chapel was subsequently built in honour of St. Adrian. In 1318, the Augustinians relocated to Pittenweem Priory.

== Bibliography ==
- Cowan, Ian B. & Easson, David E., Medieval Religious Houses: Scotland With an Appendix on the Houses in the Isle of Man, Second Edition, (London, 1976), pp. 59–60, 94-5
- Watt, D.E.R. & Shead, N.F. (eds.), The Heads of Religious Houses in Scotland from the 12th to the 16th Centuries, The Scottish Records Society, New Series, Volume 24, (Edinburgh, 2001), pp. 143–9

== See also ==
- Pittenweem Priory, the successor house
- Prior of May, for a list of priors and commendators
- Scheduled monuments in Fife
