= Ethernan =

Scottish martyr and saint

Ethernan (or Ithernan, Etharnan, Itarnan) was a 7th century Scottish martyr and saint. The focus of his cultus was the Isle of May.

== Life and death ==
Almost nothing is known about Ethernan's life. It has been speculated that he may have been a monk of Iona due to his death being mentioned in the Annals of Ulster. In 669 the Annals of Ulster record the following entry: Itarnan et Corindu apud Pictores defuncti sunt. This has traditionally been translated as "Ethernan and Corindu died among the Picts". However, Thomas Clancy has analysed the use of the word "apud" in Hiberno-Latin chronicles and concluded that the correct translation is "Ethernan and Corindu were killed by the Picts", making Ethernan and Corindu both martyrs. Clancy also writes that Ethernan and Corindu may have been "Gaels who died in foreign lands, but neither name is well known in Ireland, and both may rather be Pictish". He may have been a monk at the Isle of May monastery rather than Iona, since he is thought to be buried in the monastic cemetery there. Simon Taylor and Gilbert Márkus speculate in Place-Names of Fife that the name recorded in the annal is a Gaelic translation of an original P-Celtic name.

== Veneration ==
=== Ethernan ===
Ethernan is traditionally believed to have been buried on the Isle of May, which became the centre of his cult after his death. He was culted in several places in Scotland, such as Kilrenny, Madderty and Aberdeenshire, and a saint of the same name was also culted in Wales. Archaeological evidence suggests that pilgrims came to the Isle of May to pray at his shrine and that a healing cult developed around his shrine.

According to the analysis of Katherine Forsyth, the saint's name is inscribed in ogham on the Scoonie Stone in Fife, Rodney's Stone in Morayshire, and possibly the Fordoun Stone in Kincardineshire. In Kilrenny, he was nicknamed Saint Irnie and sometimes erroneously identified with Saint Irenaeus of Lyons. Fishermen used the steeple of "Saint Irnie's" church as a landmark when at sea, and in Anstruther some people would pray to him when the steeple came into sight.

=== Conflation with Adrian ===
At some point during the Middle Ages, Ethernan was conflated with another figure from the Isle of May, Adrian. Adrian was said to have been killed by Viking raiders in 875, and his shrine attracted pilgrims for several centuries thereafter. While it is possible that Vikings killed a monk called Adrian on the island, this cult is most likely a misremembering of Ethernan from a time when the Picts had ceased to function as an ethnic group within Scotland, and ancient martyrdoms in Britain and Ireland were commonly attributed to Vikings. In later medieval legends, such as those recorded in the Aberdeen Breviary, Ethernan and Adrian were again treated as two entirely separate saints.

After the churches of Anstruther Easter and Anstruther Wester merged in the 20th century, the former became known as St Adrian's Parish Church, and the latter became known as St Adrian's Church Hall.

== See also ==
- Adrian of May
