= Pittenweem =

Fishing village and civil parish in Fife, Scotland

Coordinates: 56.214°N 2.729°W

Pittenweem: Scottish Gaelic: Baile na h-Uaimh
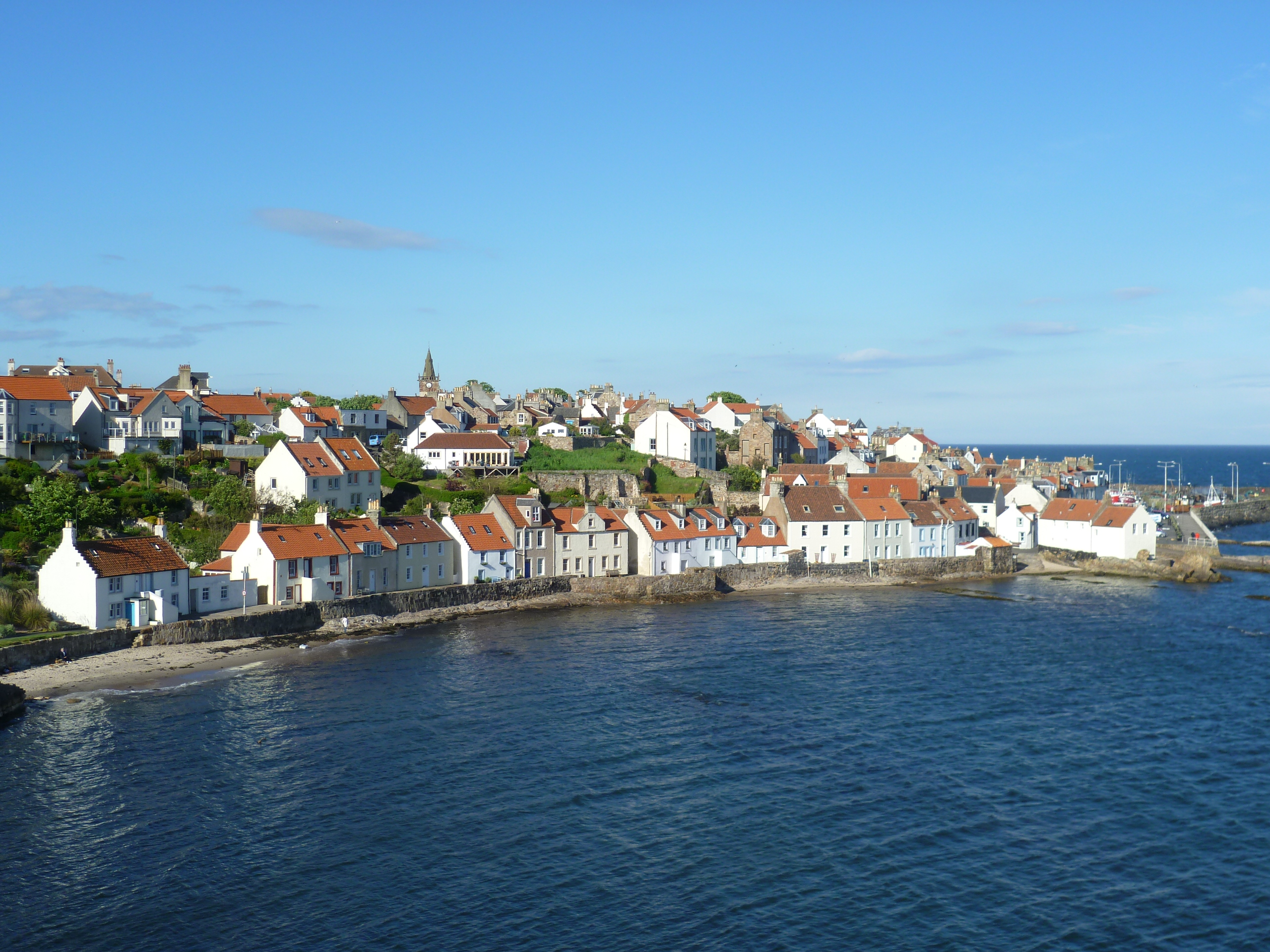
- Pittenweem

- Location within Fife
- Population: 1,450 (2020)
- OS grid reference: NO5402
- Council area: Fife
- Lieutenancy area: Fife
- Country: Scotland
- Sovereign state: United Kingdom
- Post town: Anstruther
- Postcode district: KY10
- Dialling code: 01333
- Police: Scotland
- Fire: Scottish
- Ambulance: Scottish
- UK Parliament: North East Fife
- Scottish Parliament: North East Fife

Pittenweem (/ˌpɪtənˈwiːm/) is a fishing village and civil parish in Fife, on the east coast of Scotland. At the 2001 census, it had a population of 1,747.

== Etymology ==
The name derives from Pictish and Scottish Gaelic. "Pit-" represents Pictish pett 'place, portion of land', and "-enweem" is Gaelic na h-Uaimh, 'of the Caves' in Gaelic, so "The Place of the Caves", named after St Fillan's cave. The name is rendered Baile na h-Uaimh in modern Gaelic, with baile, 'town, settlement', substituted for the Pictish prefix.

== History ==
The settlement has existed as a fishing village since early medieval times. The oldest structure, St. Fillan's Cave, dates from the 7th century. An Augustinian priory moved here from the Isle of May in the 13th century, but there was already a church at that time. Pittenweem Parish Church (which is attached to the local tolbooth) has a Norman doorway dating to before 1200. The gatehouse to the east is 15th century. The priory dormitory and refectory was remodelled post-Reformation (1588) to give a new function as a manse. This building was later named the "Great House".

Until 1975 Pittenweem was a royal burgh, having been awarded the status by King James V (1513–42) in 1541.

Founded as a fishing village around a probably early Christian religious settlement, it grew along the shoreline from the west where the sheltered beaches were safe places for fishermen to draw their boats up out of the water. Later a breakwater was built, extending out from one of the rocky skerries that jut out south-west into the Firth of Forth like fingers. This allowed boats to rest at anchor rather than being beached, enabling larger vessels to use the port. A new breakwater further to the east was developed over the years into a deep, safe harbour.

Unlike fisning ports further up the Forth, such as Buckhaven and Largo, fishing from Pittenweem continued to prosper in the years leading up to the First World War.

Fishery Statistics

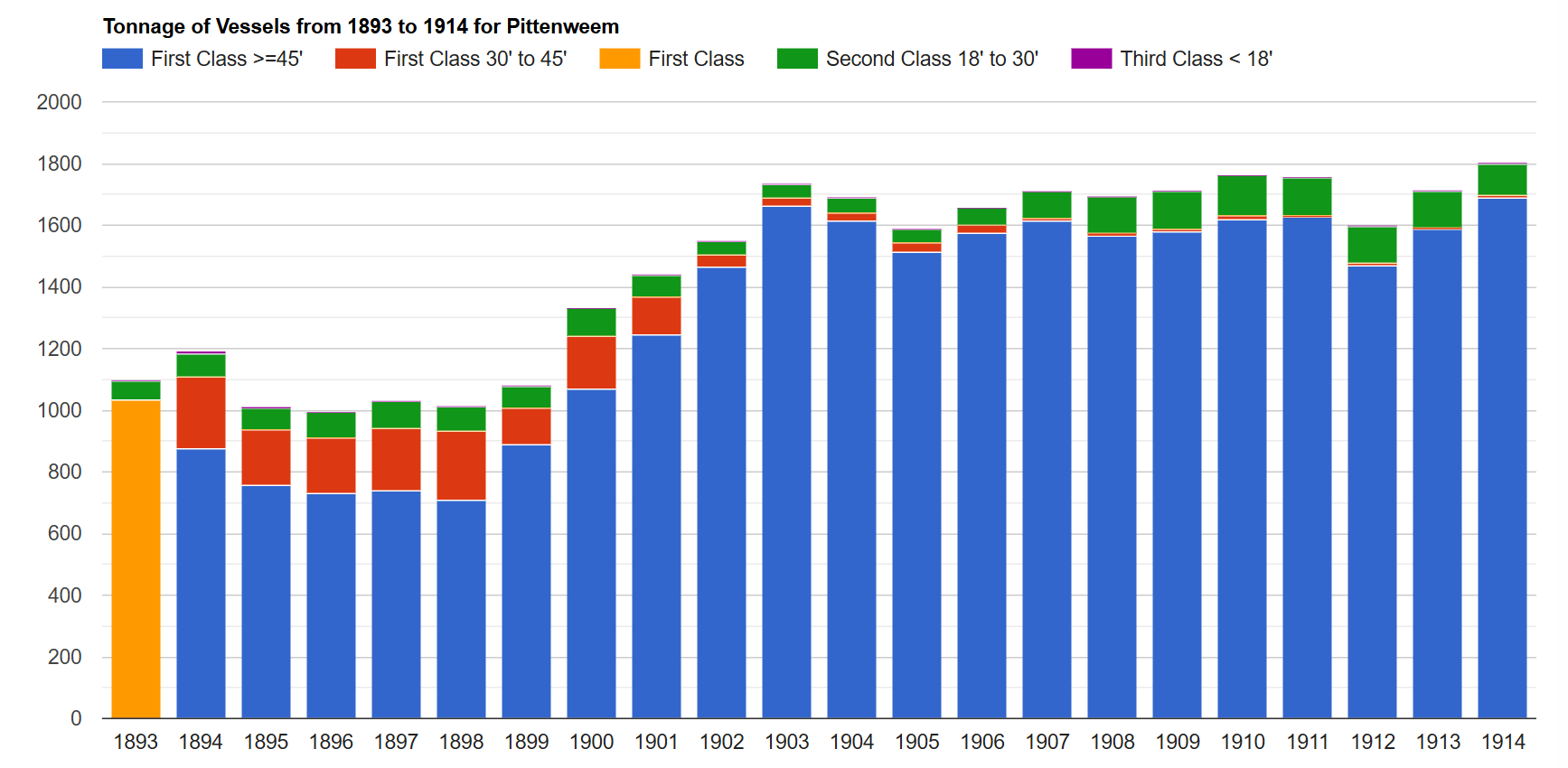
Tonnage of vessels

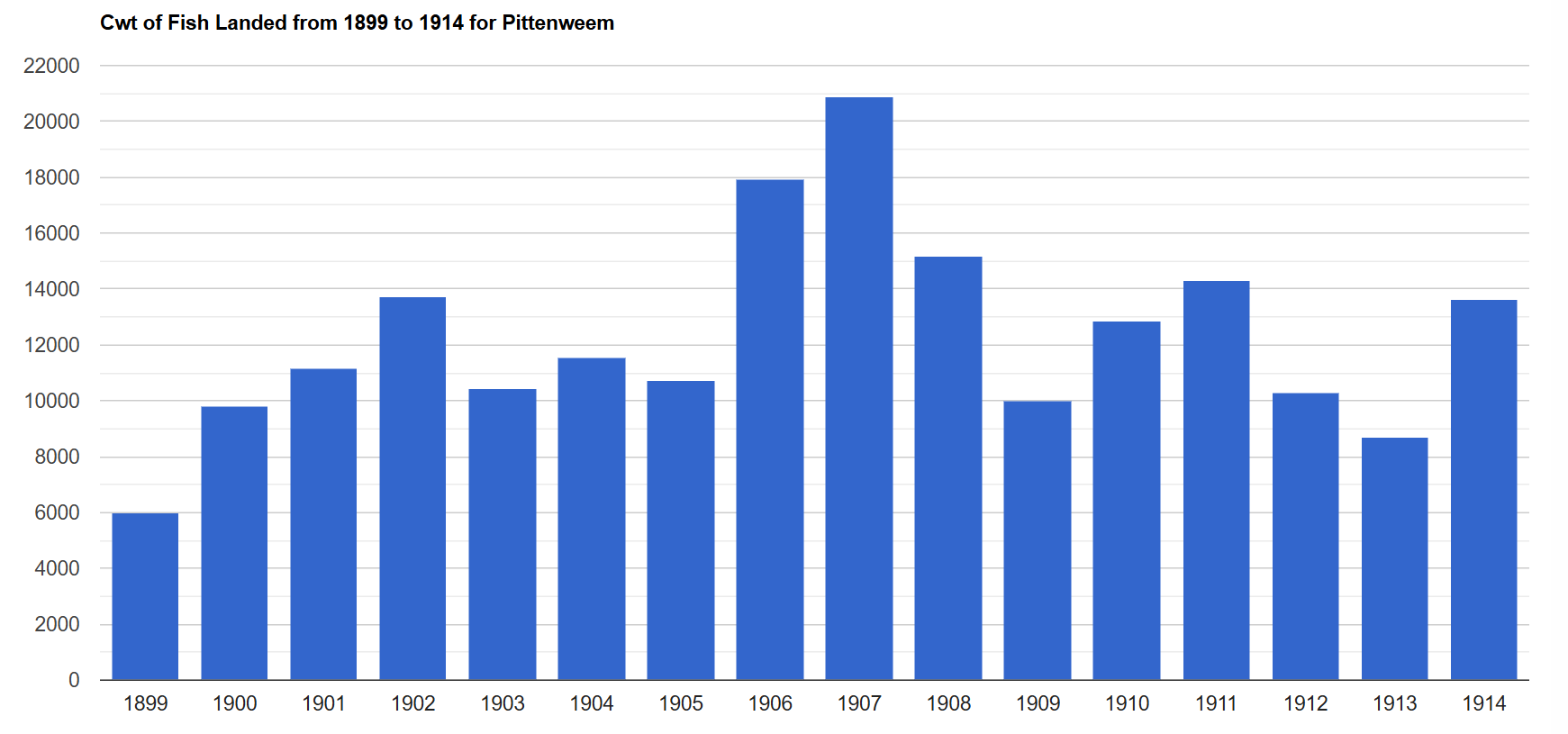
Cwt of fish landed

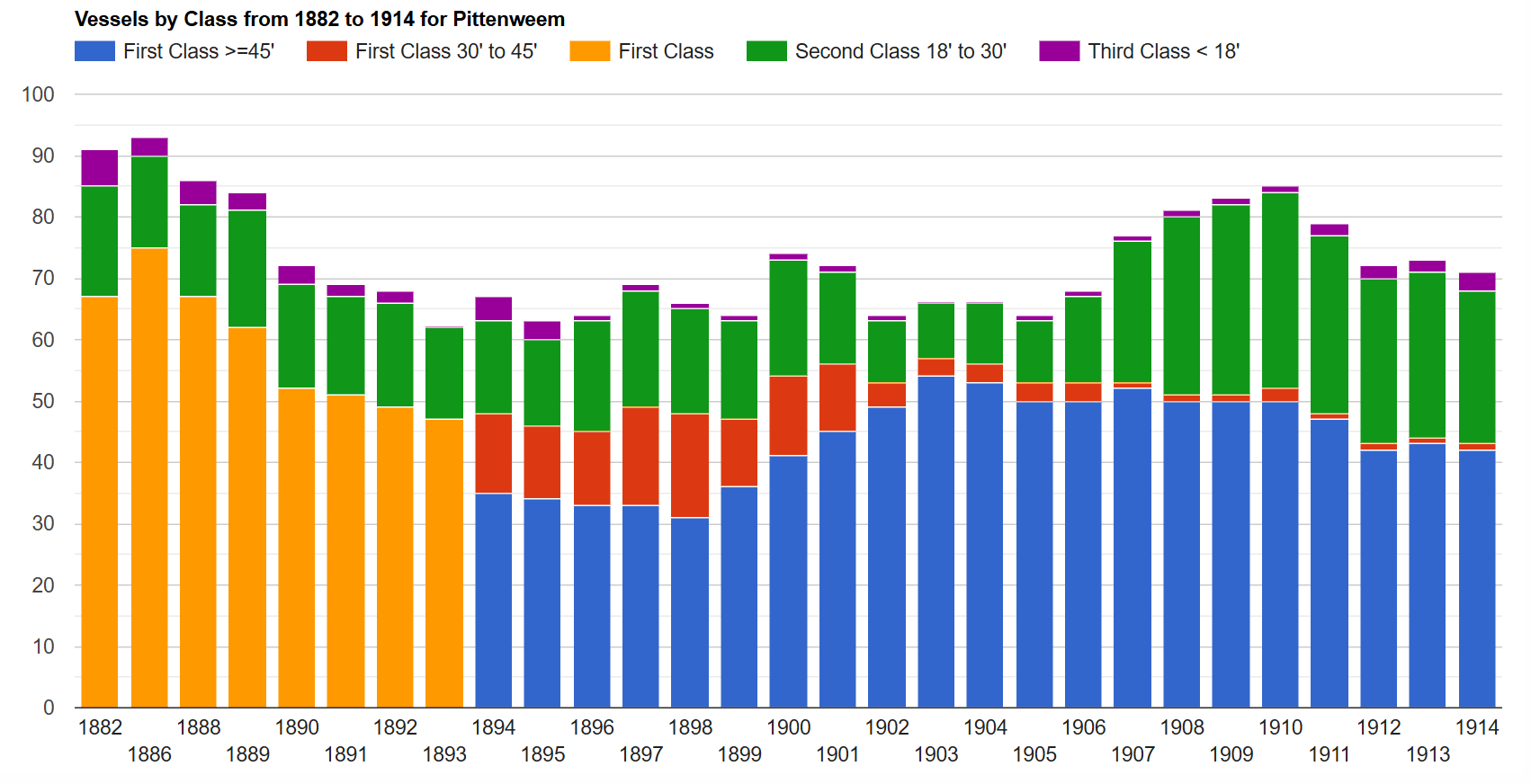
Vessels by class

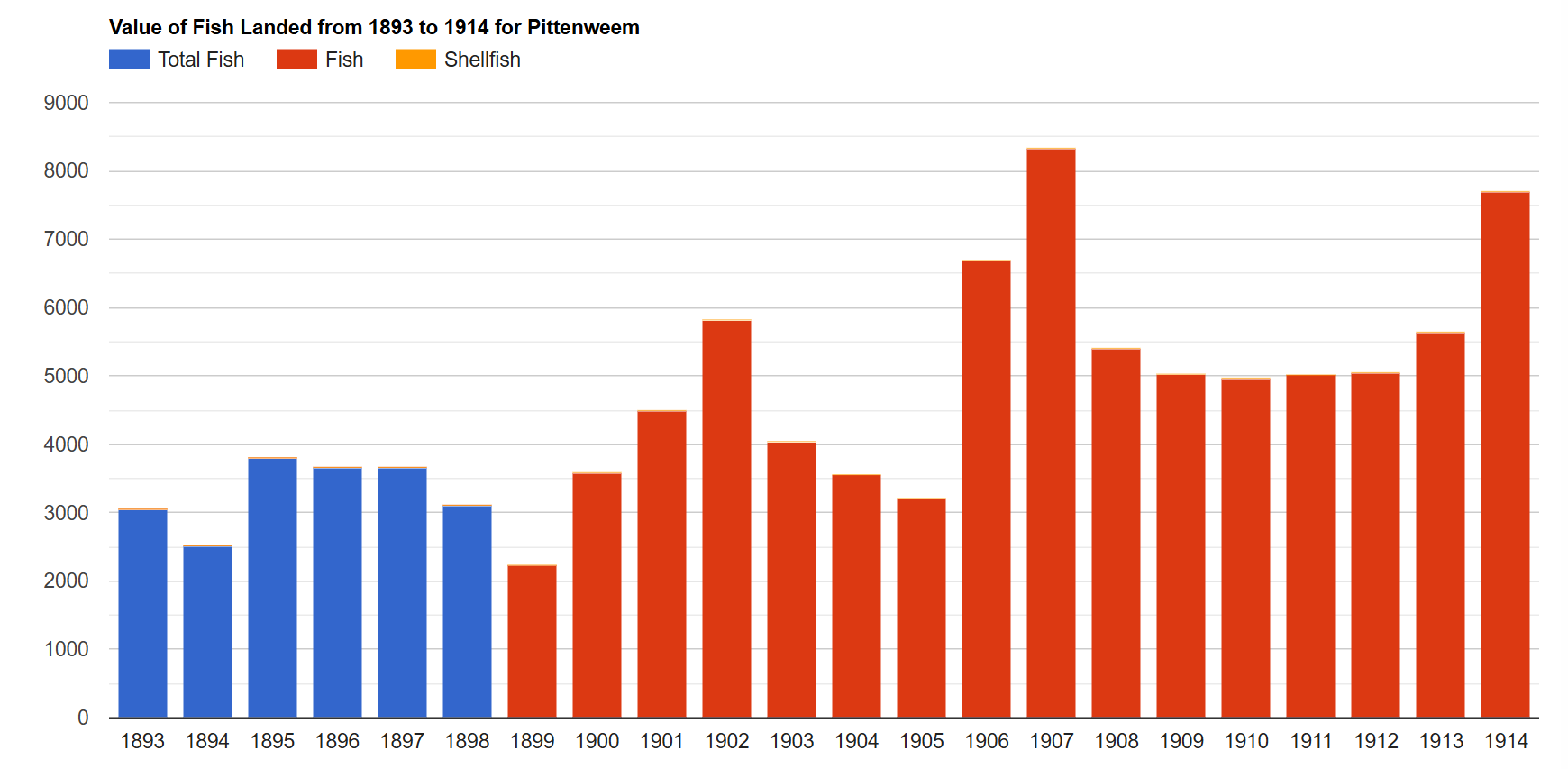
Value (£) of fish landed

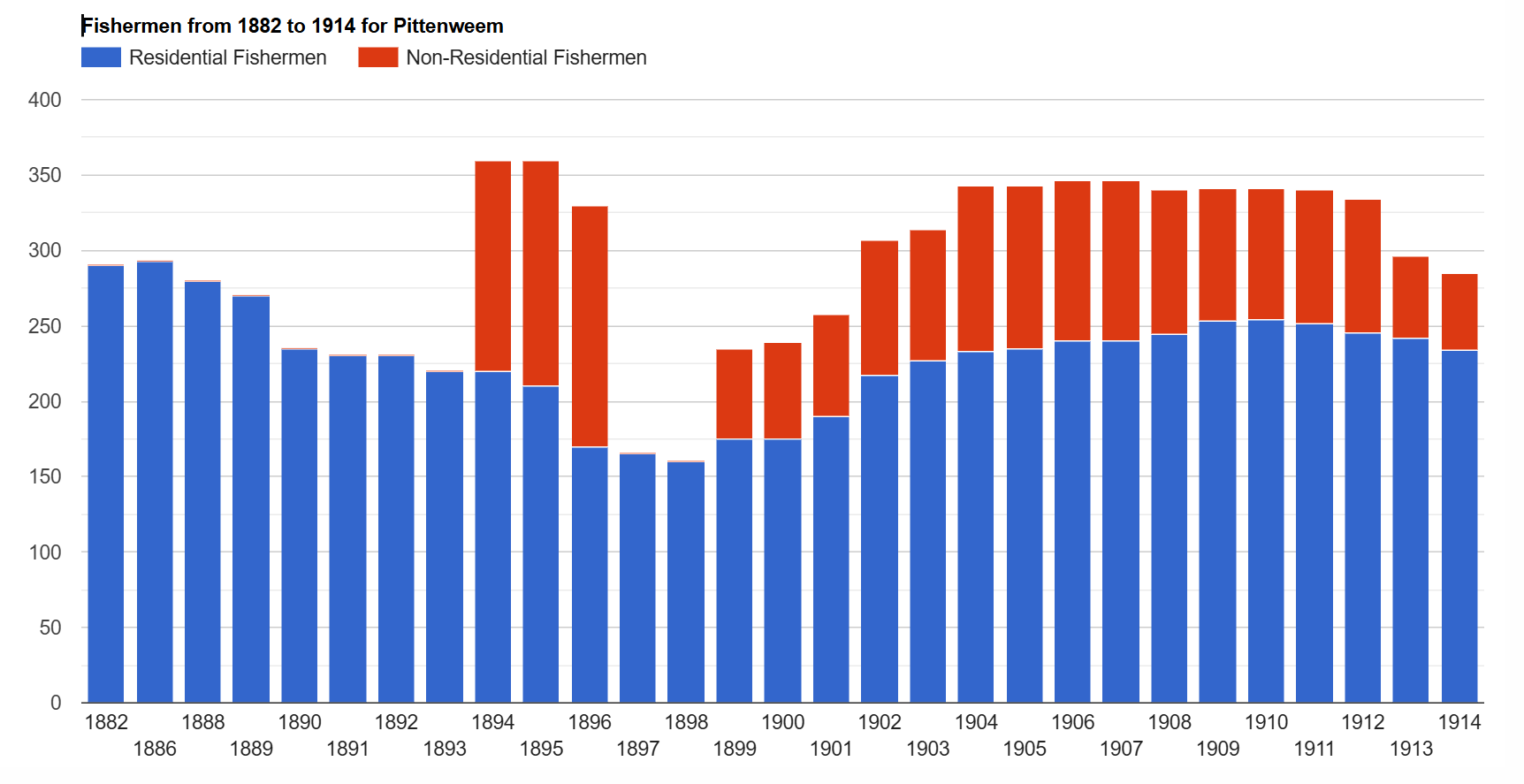
Fishermen

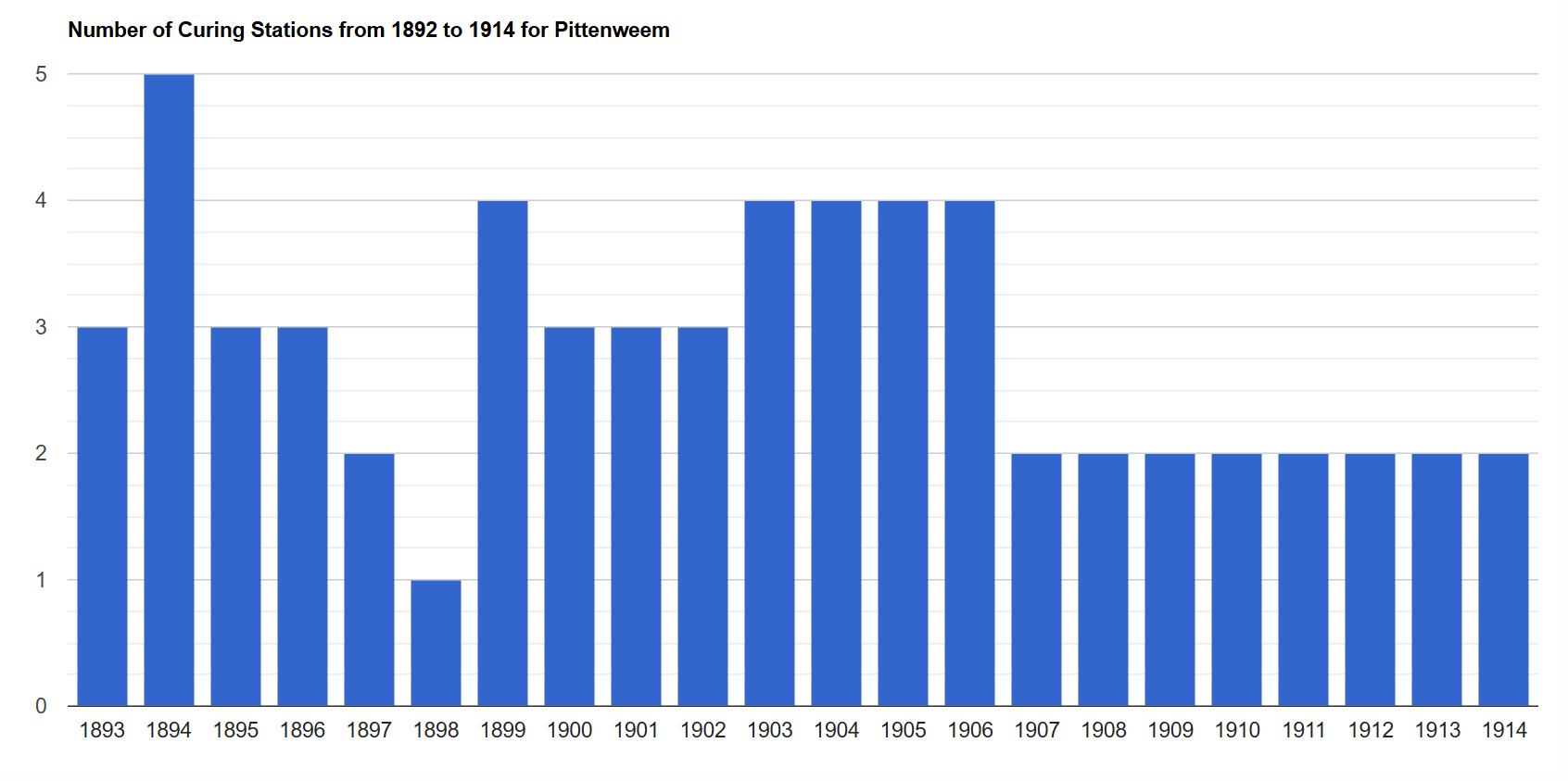
Number of curing stations

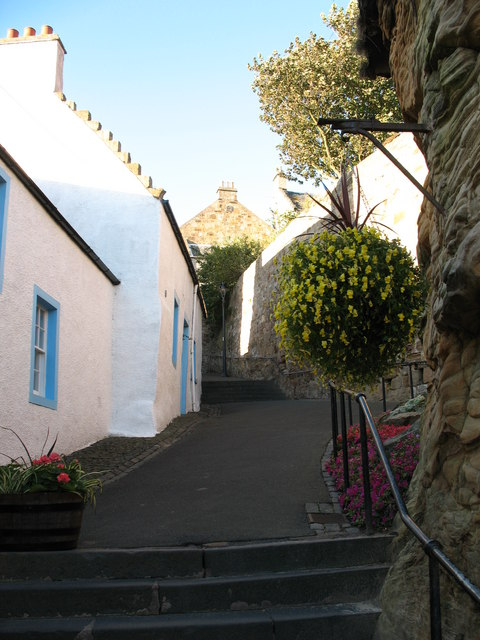
Cove Wynd – a typical alley in Pittenweem

In 1779 John Paul Jones (founder of the American Navy) anchored half-a-mile off Pittenweem in the USS Bonhomme Richard.

There is a baronial Lordship of Pittenweem in the Baronage of Scotland created by James VI for Frederick Stewart in 1609. It was held by the Earls of Kellie until it passed to Sir John Anstruther and then to the Bairds of Elie. The current Lord is Claes Zangenberg.

== Industry ==
Pittenweem is currently the most active of the fishing ports in the East Neuk coast of Fife. In the 18th century, Pittenweem had a series of coal mines on the coast between Pittenweem and St Monans.

At one time the village was served by the Fife Coast Railway.

== Geography ==
The village sits astride a raised beach.

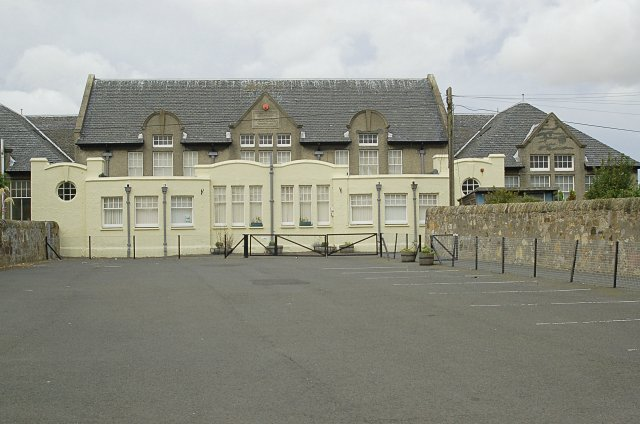
Pittenweem Primary School

== Education ==
Pittenweem Primary School is a traditional village school with its own playing fields on the northern side of the older part of the village. It caters for children aged 4/5 to 11/12. Secondary education (up to ages 16, 17 or 18 depending on educational ambitions) is provided at Waid Academy in the neighbouring town of Anstruther. The nearest private educational institution is St Leonards School in St Andrews, or the High School of Dundee.

== Religion ==
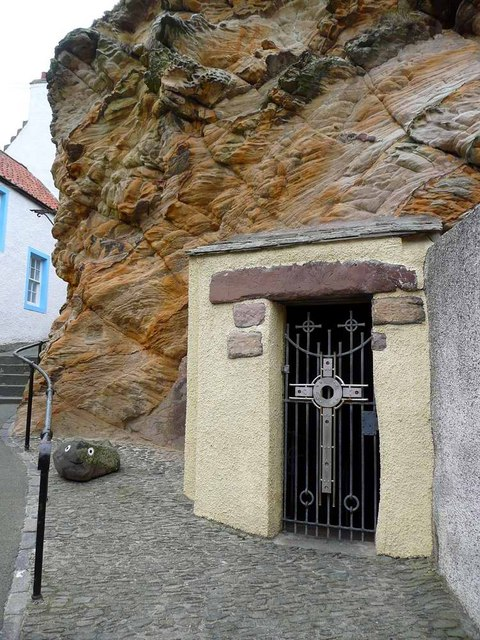
Entrance to St. Fillian's cave

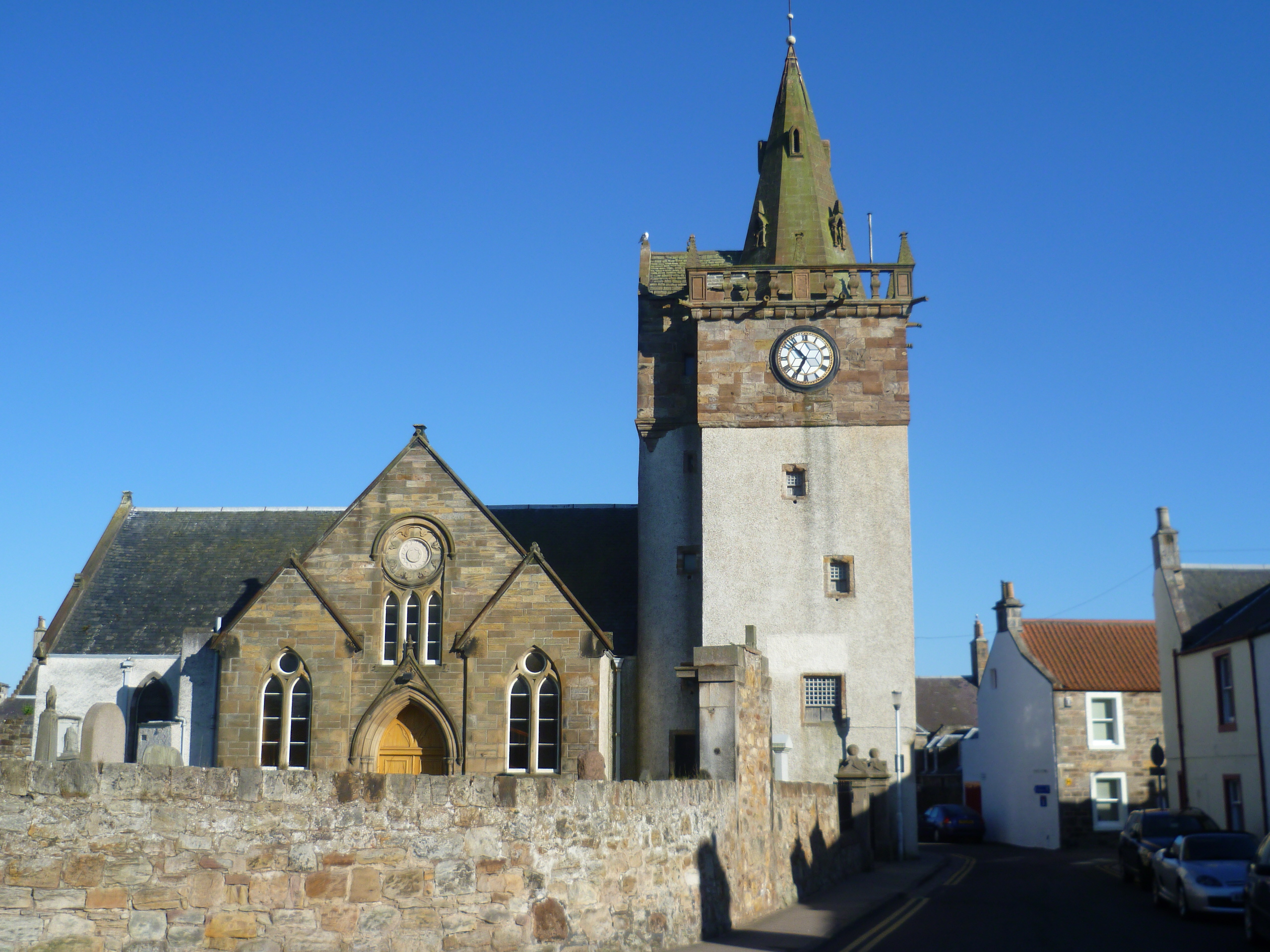
Pittenweem Parish Church and Tolbooth Steeple

In the Middle Ages, Pittenweem Priory was a small Augustinian monastery linked to that on the Isle of May and built over the ancient sacred cave associated with St Fillan. The cave, which is fitted out as a chapel, was rededicated as a place of worship by the Bishop of St. Andrews in 1935.

Current denominations with churches include: Church of Scotland, Catholic, Episcopalian and Baptist. Other denominations have had churches or the equivalent, but these have been converted to other purposes. The Parish Church Hall, for example, was once "Pittenweem St. Fillan's".

The late 17th to early 18th centuries saw a number of notorious witch-hunts by the local minister. Pittenweem Tolbooth was used as the jail for some of the Pittenweem witches. Five women were severely beaten and one was murdered by a lynch mob.

== Culture ==
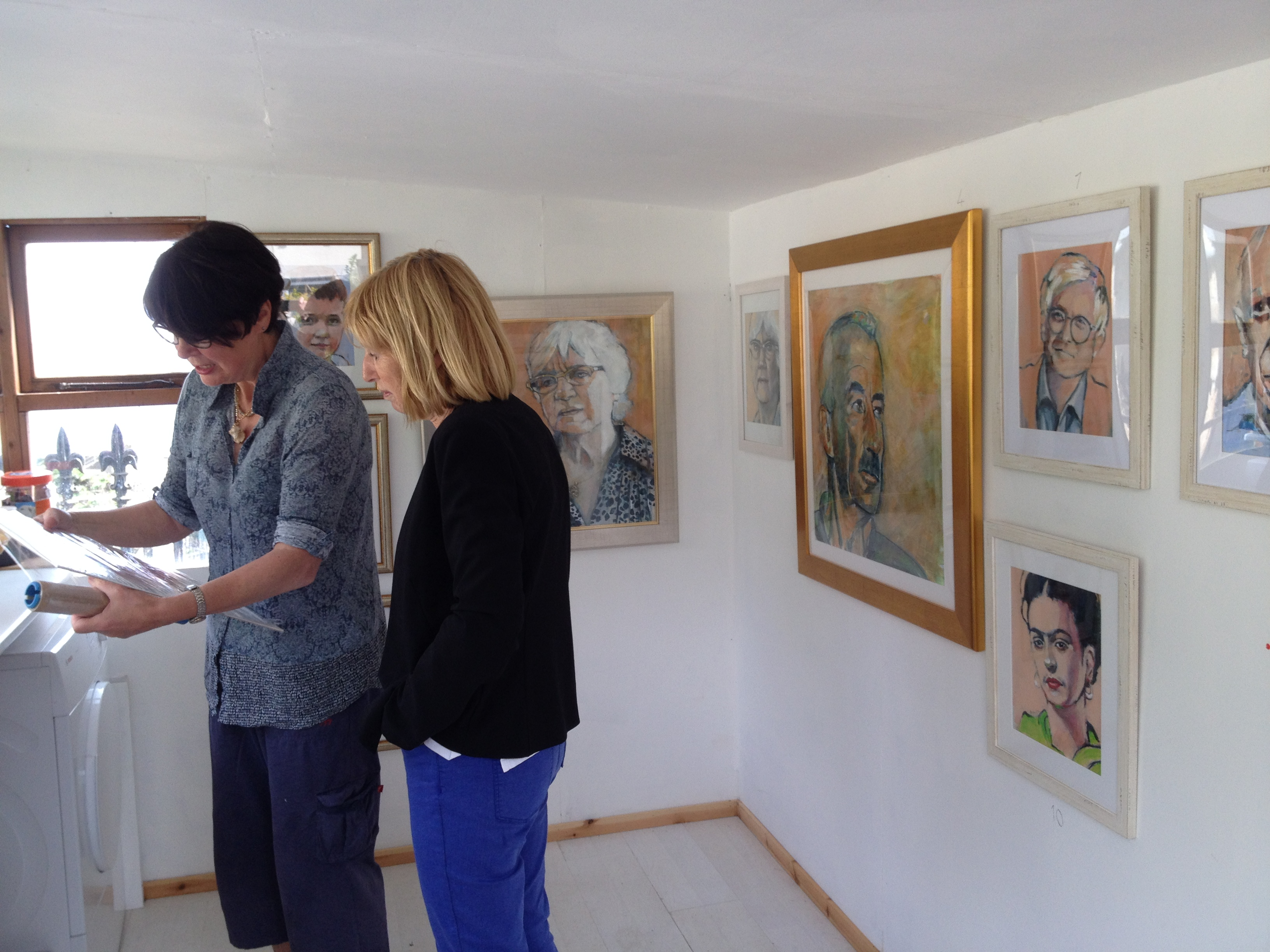
Artists studio at 2016 Pittenweem Arts Festival

In the late 1960s the local fishermen celebrated the re-opening of the re-designed harbour with a Gala Day, when the boats were dressed overall and people could take short trips on the boats. By the early 1980s, however, increasing regulation, higher fuel costs and a shrinking fleet were bringing this event to its knees. In its place in 1982 sprang up an Arts Festival, which initially incorporated the Gala Day as its finale. The Arts Festival has moved on somewhat, however, becoming one of the best-loved art festivals in Scotland with an estimated 25,000 visitors in 2013. Many artists have re-discovered the charms and the light of the area, which was always popular with itinerant and hobby artists, and have moved to the village, creating a vibrant artistic community.

Pittenweem had the first newspaper in the area, the Pittenweem Register (1844–56).

There is also a fairly well-known song, "Pittenweem Jo", written in 1960.

Much of the 1997 film The Winter Guest was filmed in the village.

== Politics ==
The local Member of the UK Parliament (representing North East Fife) is Wendy Chamberlain of the Liberal Democrats.

The local (representing Fife North East) Member of the Scottish Parliament (MSP) is Willie Rennie of the Scottish Liberal Democrats.

From 1885 to 1983, Pittenweem was part of the East Fife Parliamentary constituency, its most famous MP being Prime Minister H. H. Asquith (Liberal) from 1886 to 1918.

== Sport ==
The local football team is Pittenweem Rovers AFC. The local rugby team is Waid Academy FPRFC.

== Bus services ==
Pittenweem is served by two main bus services operated by Stagecoach East Scotland. These are:

- 95 from Leven to St Andrews via Anstruther and Crail
- X61 from Edinburgh to St Andrews via Kirkcaldy, Leven and Anstruther

Passenger railway services from Edinburgh to Leven were restored in 2024; the new station is adjacent to the bus station. Formerly, the line, which closed in 1965, continued around the Fife Coast to St Andrews, to which the remaining line from Leuchars closed in 1969.

== Notable people ==
- John Douglas (1721–1807), Anglican Bishop of Salisbury
- Sir Walter Watson Hughes (1803–1887), public benefactor, founder of the University of Adelaide, South Australia
- Wallace Lindsay (Wallace Martin Lindsay) (1858–1937), classical scholar, Professor of Humanity at St Andrews University, 1899 to 1937
- John Smith (1770–1816), clockmaker
- Frederick Stewart, Lord Pittenweem (1591–1625), local aristocrat
- Ian Stewart (1938–1985), musician

== In popular culture ==
The British power metal band Gloryhammer has a song titled "Vorpal Laserblaster of Pittenweem" on their 2023 album Return to the Kingdom of Fife.

== Gallery ==
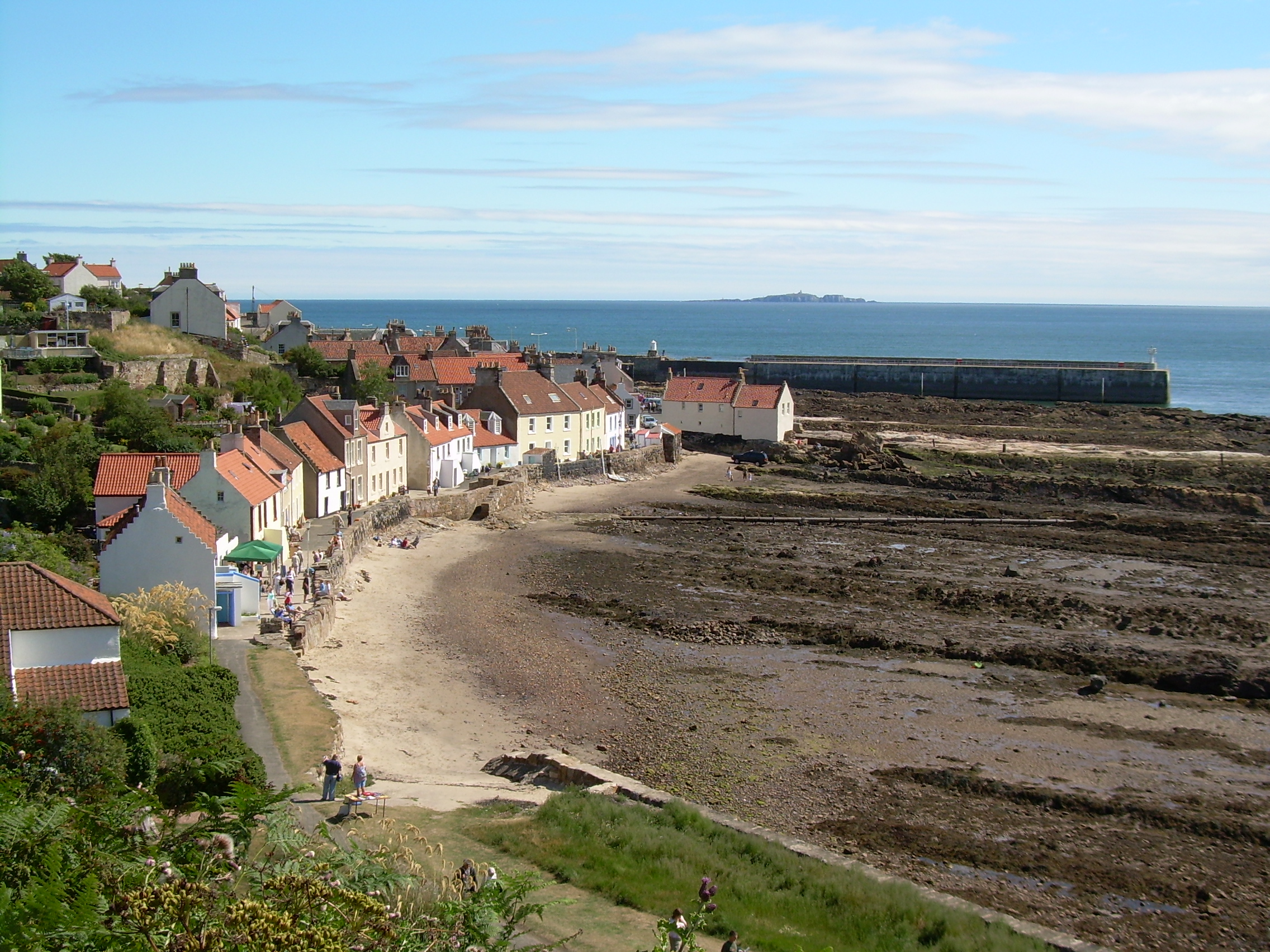
West Shore, Pittenweem from the West Braes showing skerries in the foreground, the old harbour in the mid-ground and the new harbour in the background. The Isle of May (or May Island) is on the horizon.

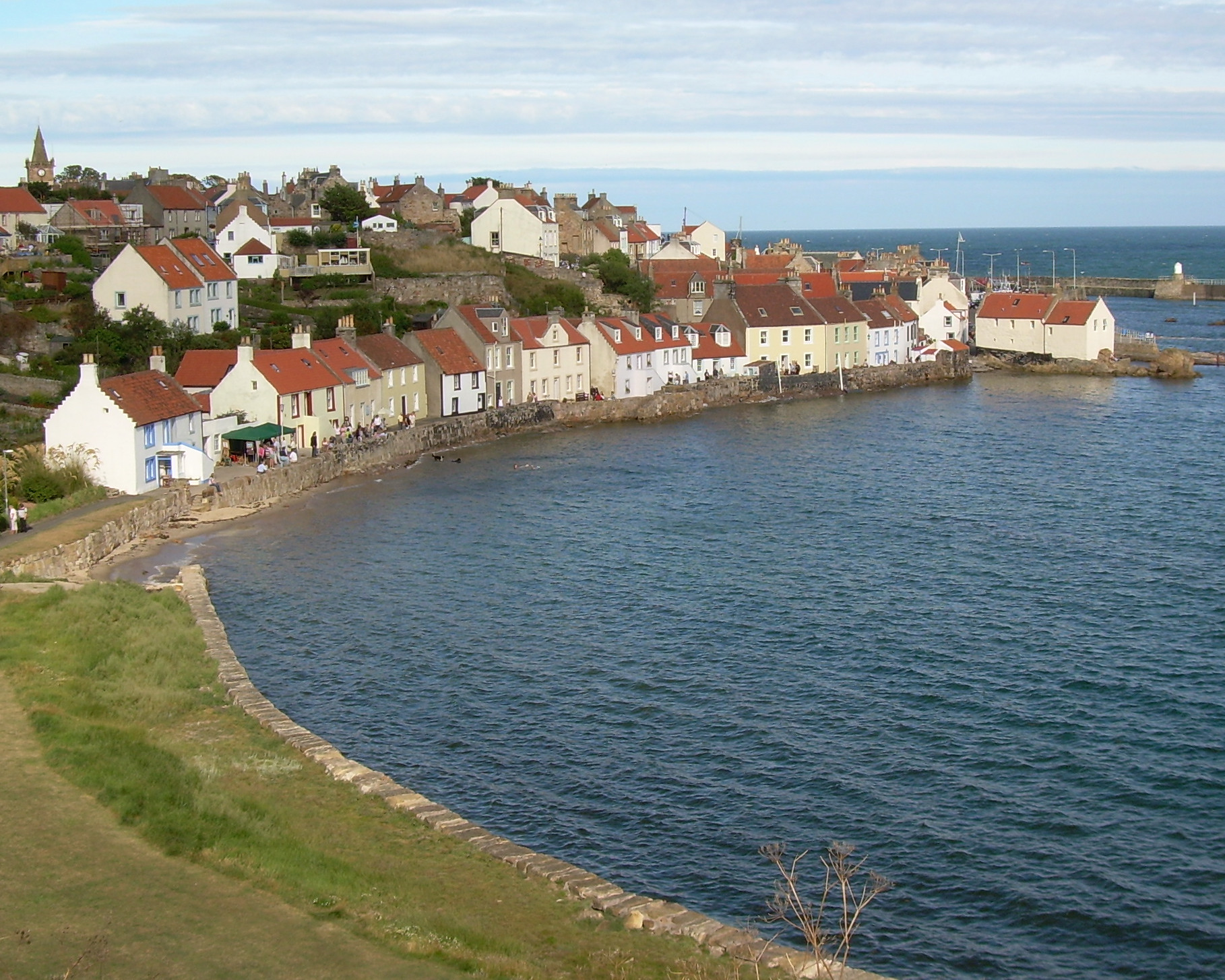
West Shore, Pittenweem from the West Braes

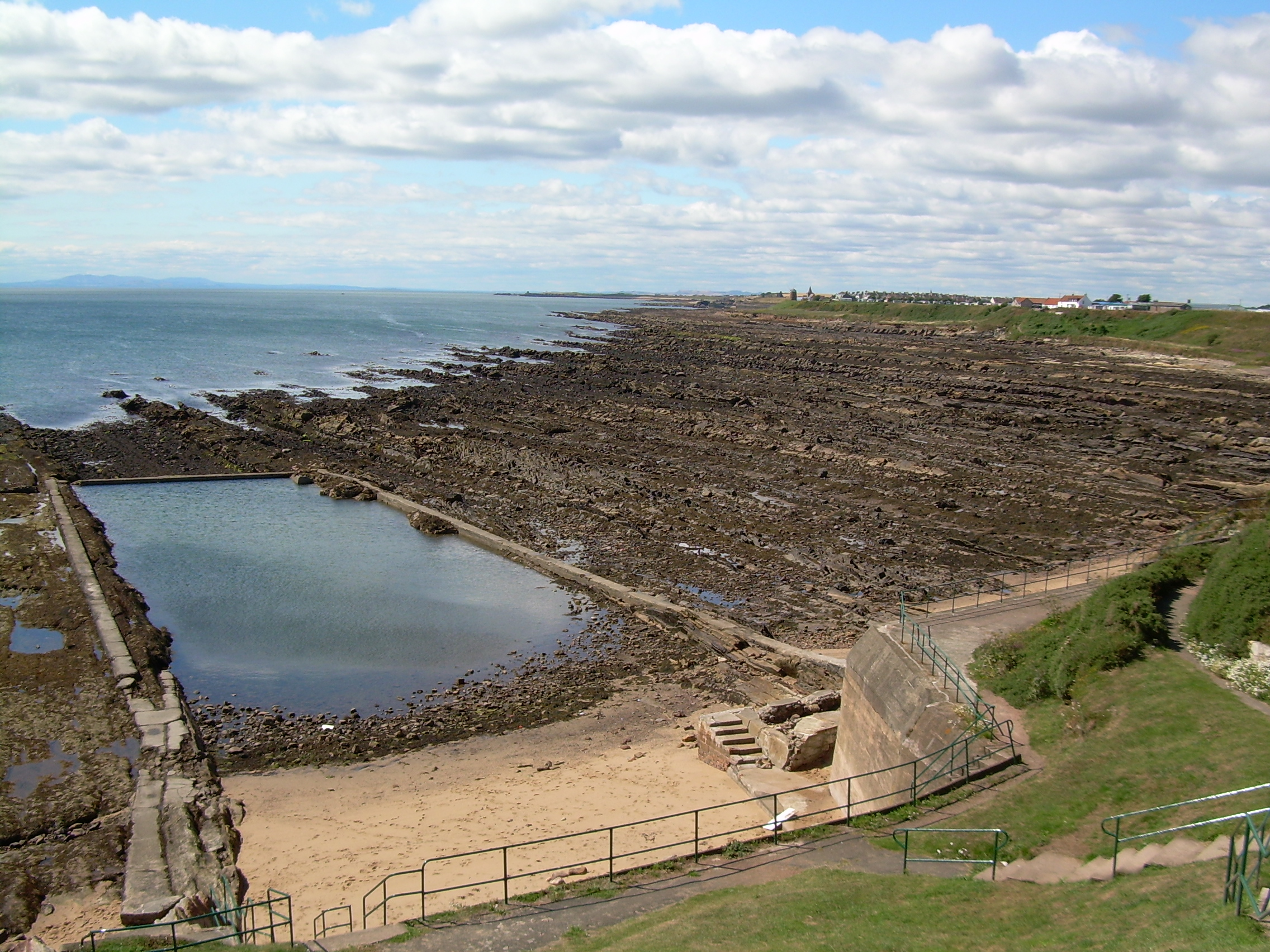
Pittenweem swimming pool looking towards St Monans with the Lady's Tower, Elie, in the distance

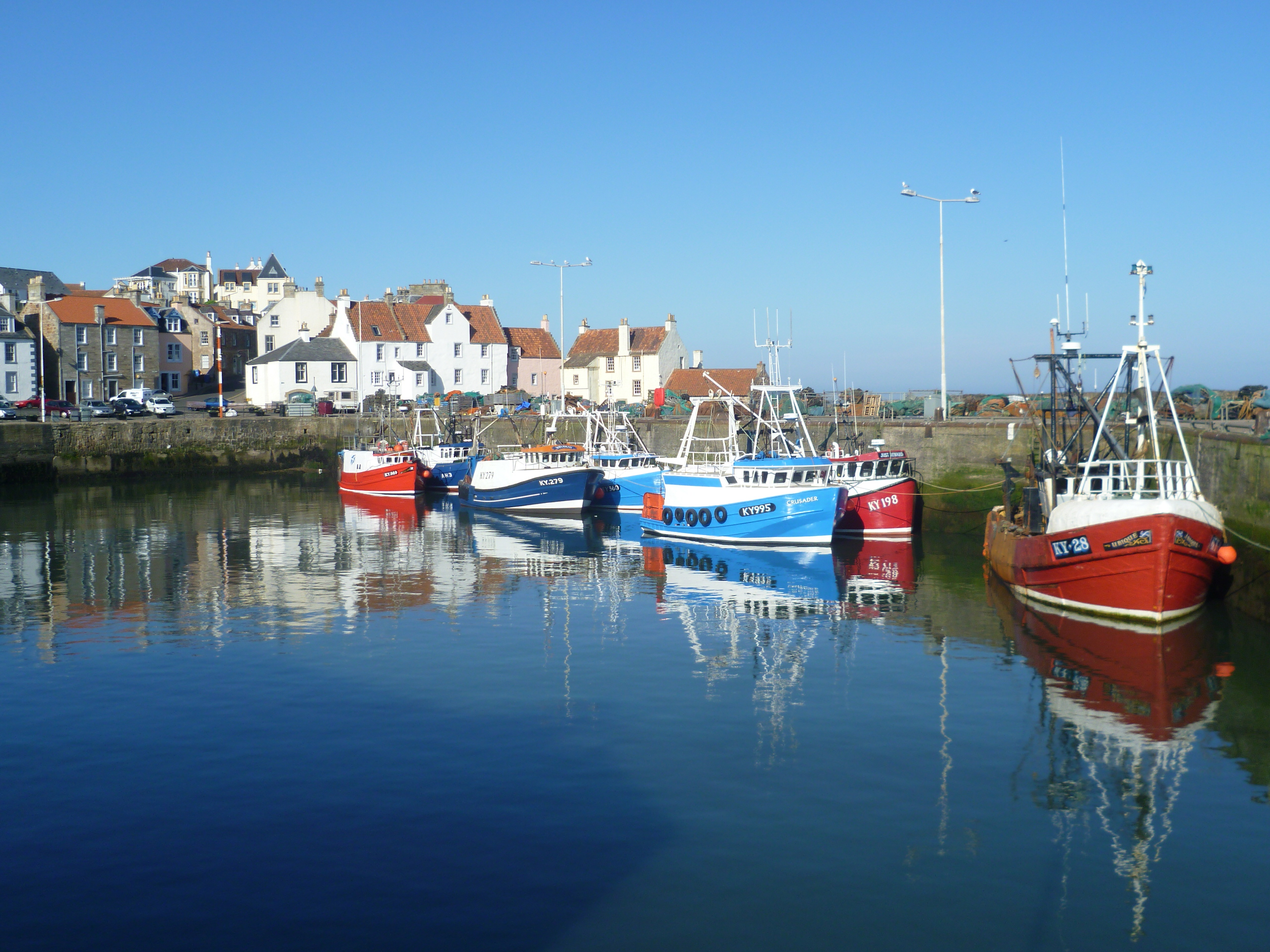
Pittenweem Harbour

== See also ==
- List of fishing villages
- Moschatel Press
