= Adrian of May =

Scottish martyr-saint (died 875)

Saint Adrian of May (sometimes given as "Ethernan") (d. 875) was a martyr-saint of ancient Scotland, whose cult became popular in the 14th century. He is commemorated on 3 December. He may have been a Bishop of Saint Andrews.

== Life and martyrdom ==
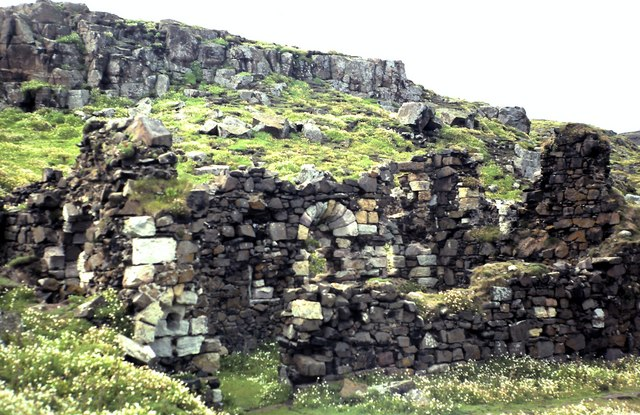
St Mary the Virgin Priory, Isle of May

Little is known of the life of this Scottish saint and martyr. He is held by some to have been an Irish monk and bishop, with the Gaelic name of Ethernan, who, though he might have been the Bishop of St. Andrews, was drawn to remote locations and had a series of monasteries and hermitages built on the Isle of May (which is five miles (8 km) out to sea in the Firth of Forth) and along the coast of Fife. Later he withdrew from St. Andrews due to the invading Danes and took refuge on the island.

What is known is that about AD 875, marauding Vikings invaded the island of May. They then slaughtered the entire population of the monastery, traditionally numbered at six thousand six hundred. The island was then abandoned for centuries.

In 1145, King David I of Scotland gave the island to Reading Abbey in Berkshire, England, at which point, the island again became a religious centre. The English monks started the erection of a small monastery dedicated to St. Mary the Virgin, with a shrine to St. Ethernan.

Early building was hampered due to raiding parties of Scandinavians who had settled in Orkney. The privations and isolation of the location finally led the monks to transfer the island in some manner to the Bishop of St. Andrews in AD 1288. Shortly thereafter, in 1296, war broke out between the Kingdoms of Scotland and England over territorial claims along the border between the two realms. This was paralleled in a legal fight between the abbey and the bishop over who actually owned the island. Initially, the abbey was confirmed as the lawful owner. This, however, was overturned in 1313 and the island was declared a part of the diocese. In consequence of this, English forces attacked the island and destroyed the monastery. After the conclusion of hostilities, the island became an important symbol of national pride, and pilgrimages to May became a common feature of religious life for the Scottish people.

== Royal pilgrims ==
According to the chronicle of Mathieu d'Escouchy, Mary of Guelders visited the Isle of May and the shrine of St Adrian when she first arrived in Scotland in 1449. He mentions that the cemetery contained the bodies of many holy men, and was surrounded by a high wall.

Andrew Wood of Largo is said to have maintained a ship for the pilgrimages of James III and Margaret of Denmark to the shrine of St Adrian. His August 1513 charter for the free barony of Largo includes this service for James IV and his "dearest consort" Margaret Tudor and their successors. James IV came to the island on 3 May 1504, and 10 May 1506 on board the Margaret. The royal treasurer's accounts mention that James IV wore new yellow breeches. The clerks of the Chapel Royal sang on the island, and James supported a hermit.

On 24 August 1539 Mary of Guise and James V made a pilgrimage to the Isle of May. They took three ships, the Unicorn, the Little Unicorn, and the Mary Willoughby. It was believed that a visit to the shrine of St Adrian could help a woman become pregnant. In October 1540 James V commissioned a reliquary for a bone of St Adrian of May from the court goldsmith John Mosman, to be made from Scottish gold.

== Post-Reformation ==
When the Scottish Reformation took hold in the 16th century, public devotion to the saints—and thus pilgrimages to the site—came to a halt and the Protestant bishop of St. Andrews soon decided to sell the island into private ownership. Slowly the island sank into ruin, with most of the surviving monastic buildings disappearing. Recently the island has become the site of archaeological excavations seeking the remains of the original monastic community which died at the hands of the Vikings.

== Veneration ==
=== Ethernan ===
Ethernan was a 7th century Scottish monk martyred by the Picts and believed to be buried on the Isle of May. which became the centre of his cult. He was honored in a number of places in Scotland, including Madderty and Aberdeenshire. It appears that pilgrims came to the Isle of May to pray at his shrine for healing.

At some point during the Middle Ages, Ethernan got conflated with Adrian of May, whose shrine attracted pilgrims for the next several centuries. His cult is most likely a misremembering of Ethernan from a time when the Picts had ceased to function as an ethnic group within Scotland and ancient martyrdoms in Britain and Ireland were commonly attributed to Vikings.

== See also ==
- Ethernan
- Isle of May Priory
- Prior of May (Pittenweem)
