= Pittenweem witches =

Scottish women accused of witchcraft

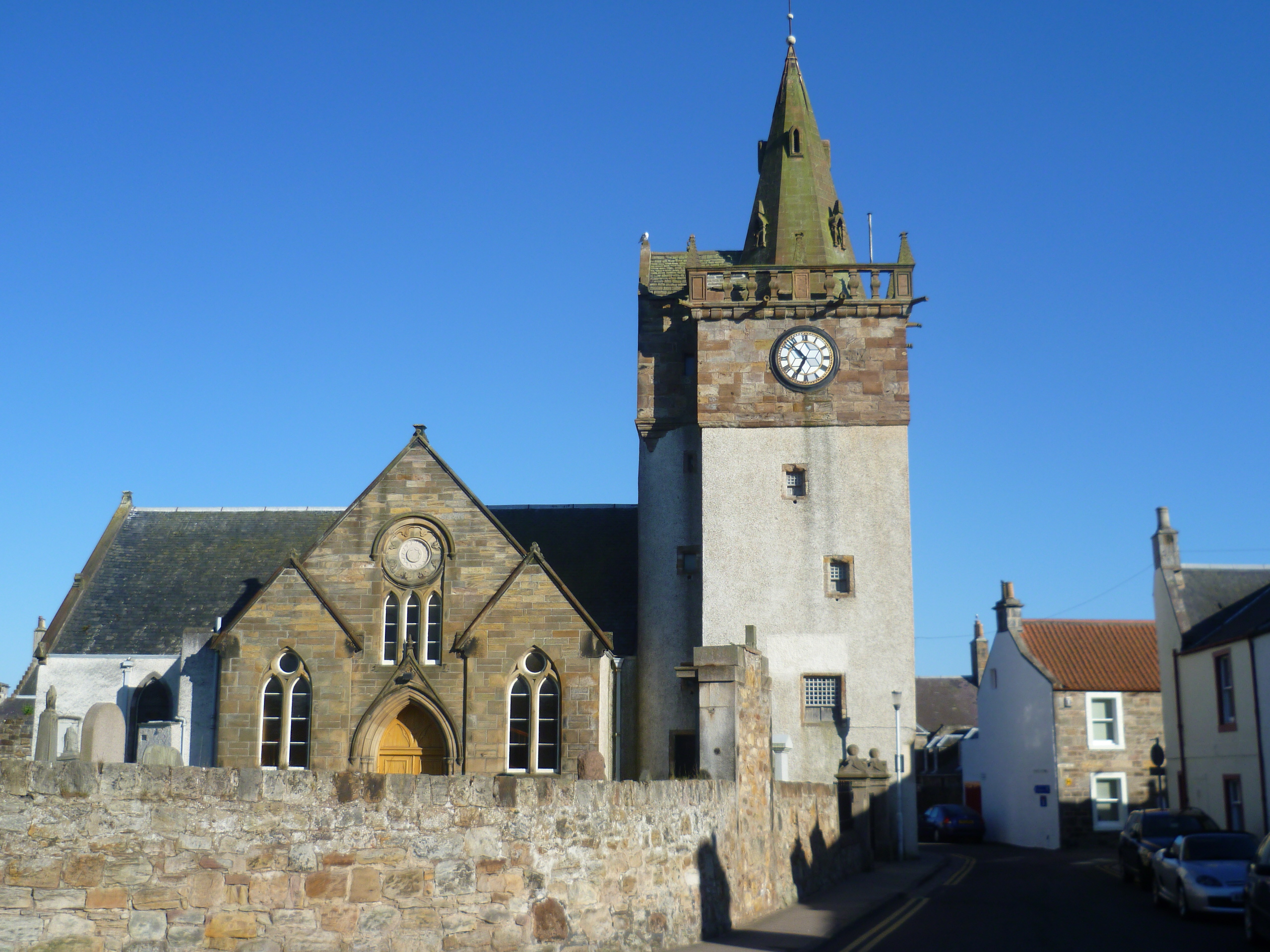
Pittenweem Parish Church and Tolbooth Steeple where some of the accused witches were held and tortured

The Pittenweem witches were five Scottish women accused of witchcraft in the small fishing village of Pittenweem in Fife on the east coast of Scotland in 1704. Another two women and a man were named as accomplices. Accusations made by a teenage boy, Patrick Morton, against a local woman, Beatrix Layng, led to the death in prison of Thomas Brown, and, in January 1705, the murder of Janet Cornfoot by a lynch mob in the village.

Cornfoot's murder was investigated by members of the aristocracy appointed by the Privy Council two weeks after the killing. Subsequently, four men were held in custody and charges were to be brought against the burgh bailie. The release of the four accused men was authorised by Patrick Cowper, the local minister, who had been involved with the initial witchcraft allegations and the torture and confinement of the alleged witches. Despite instructions from the Privy Council that another committee should look into the events, no suspects were ever prosecuted for the murder.

Two of the accused women, Layng and Nicholas Lawson, were imprisoned again in 1708–1709 after charges of witchcraft were levelled against them by Cowper and another local minister. They were released in April 1709 and pardoned after Queen Anne issued an Act of Indemnity. Another of the accused women, Janet Horseburgh, sued the bailies responsible for her incarceration; she received an apology and monetary recompense.

== Events ==
In early March 1704 Beatrix Layng approached Patrick Morton, a 16-year-old working in his father's smithy, to ask if he would make her some nails. Morton refused as he was already assigned an urgent task making nails for a merchant's ship in the harbour. Displeased, Layng left threatening revenge on him. The following day Morton noticed a bucket filled with water and burning coal outside Layng's house; he thought it was there to cast a spell on him. Layng had a reputation as a witch having already appeared before the Kirk session in 1696 for charming. Morton immediately felt weak and had difficulty standing or walking. His health deteriorated; he began to have fits and convulsions, his stomach became distended and his body was rigid and twisted. People claimed they could see marks left on his skin by fingernails where Morton said he had been pinched. He refused food and his breathing was laboured.

The Sadducismus debellatus pamphlets, written by Lord Cullen, (Note: Sadducismus debellatus was the title of the London edition; a version entitled A True Narrative of the Sufferings and Relief of a Young Girle was published anonymously in Edinburgh during 1698.) giving details about the demonic possession of Christian Shaw, the 11-year-old girl at the centre of the Paisley witches trials, were in circulation at the time. Patrick Cowper, the local minister who was intolerant of witches, had read the pamphlets to Morton just before his afflictions began. The villagers' suspicions were aroused that the Devil was implicated when no explanation could be given for Morton's condition; initially his seizures were described as unusual then as preternatural. Cowper continued to advise Morton about what happened in Paisley and encouraged him to name Layng as the person who had called upon the Devil to inflict his ailments. In May 1704 Morton named Layng as a witch and, with further prompting from Cowper, accused four local women of being her accomplices: Isobel Adam; Janet Cornfoot; Nicholas Lawson; and Lillie Wallace. Subsequent statements revealed that he identified another woman, Janet Horseburgh, as an accomplice.

Like Layng, Cornfoot had a reputation for casting spells and threatened anyone she was quarrelling with; Lawson, a farmer's wife, had previously been approached by other locals seeking advice about witchcraft. Horseburgh, the widow of a seaman who had been a local magistrate, was widely believed within the community to be a witch. Academic Stuart Macdonald describes the stereotypical witch in Fife as a woman who was elderly and poor; one 18th-century publication described Layng as a "very poor woman who had married meanly" but although she was by no means wealthy, her husband was a tailor and the treasurer in Pittenweem. Likewise Horseburgh did not live in a state of poverty.

Cornfoot confessed after being beaten by the local Presbyterian Minister, Patrick Cowper, in Pittenweem Tolbooth.

== Investigation ==
After Morton named the women, Cowper and the local bailies immediately sought them out and imprisoned them in Pittenweem Tolbooth. While they were incarcerated the women were tortured and beaten. They were forcefully kept awake – Layng claimed it was for five days and five nights – and constantly pricked by a group of men intoxicated by alcohol. Cowper carried out some of the beatings, attacking Cornfoot with a walking stick. The beatings were vicious and later described by one letter writer as "The ministers have used a great deal of barbarous severities to extort confessions from those poor unhappy creatures." Layng finally confessed after the women were taken into Morton's bedroom where, despite being blindfolded, he was able to identify and name them all as responsible for his ailments.

Layng, who was charged with maleficium, confessed she had made spells with buckets of water and burning coals as well as stabbing needles into a wax model of her intended victim. She met the Devil in the form of a black dog on Ceres Moor and made a bargain with him; she knew he was the Devil as he had the ability to change shape and had undergone a transformation in front of her. Initially she offered him her daughter then her granddaughter who was six years old. The four other women were named as co-conspirators in her confession.

Adam admitted to not only having a pact with the Devil but also having copulated with him and allowing him to brand her with his mark. She confessed that she colluded with the others to kill a local man; the plot only failed because he had woken up and made the Sign of the cross. Her statement implicated a seventh person, Thomas Brown, as being involved as a witch; Brown was charged and incarcerated in the tolbooth but did not confess to any of the allegations. He died of starvation, a common occurrence among suspected witches who, like Brown, were confined for lengthy times. Confessions were obtained from Cornfoot and Lawson with Cornfoot later adding that the Devil had visited her while she was imprisoned. She claimed he promised her that she would only be kept incarcerated for a short period providing she did not admit guilt but threatened to "tear her to pieces" should she confess.

The four women who had confessed – Adam, Cornfoot, Layng and Lawson – were interviewed at the kirk session on 29 May, each re-affirming their statements and reiterating the names of others. Horsefoot and Wallace were examined by the presbytery on 14 June but continued to proclaim their innocence of the witchcraft charges. (Note: Cowper was temporarily acting as moderator of the presbytery at the time.) The Privy Council was approached to obtain permission for a trial to be held locally but it ordered Sir James Stewart, the Lord Advocate, to arrange for the proceedings to take place in Edinburgh with the Privy Council bearing the transport costs. (Note: Levack speculates the underlying reason for wanting the trial to be held locally is probably because convictions were more likely.) The Earl of Rothes, who was the Sheriff of Fife, was instructed to oversee the transfer. An anonymous essay entitled the True and full relation of the witches at Pittenweem was published while the women were incarcerated; using the pseudonym of "A Lover of Truth", the author attempted to rationalise the punishment of witches and reflected the Calvinist view on spirits. The Scottish High Court refused to convict Cornfoot, and she was sent back to Pittenweem.

The costs of keeping the women imprisoned in the tolbooth at Pittenweem were becoming prohibitive; on 12 August, after payment of five hundred marks, all the women except Cornfoot were released on bail. In September Morton was summoned to give evidence to the Privy Council but he had fully regained his health and displayed no symptoms of being possessed. Adam was questioned by the Privy Council in October and freed. In November, Layng, Lawson, Horsefoot and Wallace were released after paying a fine of £8 each; but the last of the accused, (Note: By this time Thomas Brown had died.) Cornfoot, was kept in solitary confinement in the tolbooth by Cowper. One of the prison guards, who perhaps felt sorry for her, put her in a cell with a window low enough for her to escape so she also gained her freedom.

== Lynching ==
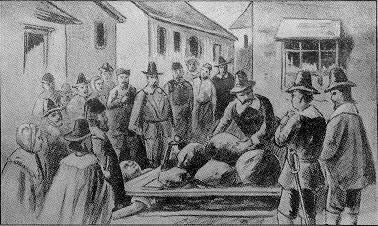
Cornfoot was killed in a similar manner to that used in the pressing of Giles Corey during the Salem witch trials.

After escaping, Cornfoot made her way to the home village of Leuchars, eight miles from Pittenweem, where she was either discovered by the minister, George Gordon, or had approached him for help. For the reward of £10, he arranged an armed guard of two men to return her to Cowper's house on 30 January 1705. Cowper was not at home when they arrived so she was taken to one of the bailies. A mob of at least ten people forcibly removed her from the house, tied her up, beat her, then hauled her down to the harbour by her ankles, possibly with the intention of dunking her. A rope was run from the top of the masthead on a ship back to the shore and she was dangled from it while the crowd threw stones at her as she swung backwards and forwards. When they took her down, she was covered by a door that had heavy stones placed on top of it until she was crushed to death. (Note: This method of torture, called Peine forte et dure, was used in England but was not common in Scotland. The villagers may have learned of it from the much publicised details of the Salem witch-trials.) A cart pulled by a horse was guided over her corpse more than once to ensure she was dead. The crowd took her body to the home of her co-accused, Nicolas Lawson, with the intention of torturing her in the same manner but decided they had sufficient sport for the day.

Cornfoot's lynching had taken place with unequivocal support from Cowper – members of his family had participated – together with assistance from high-ranking members of the burgh; it would not have succeeded without their approval. Public reaction in the immediate aftermath of Cornfoot's death was diverse. An anonymous letter was published from an individual using the pen name of "A Gentleman from Fife"; under the heading of An Answer of a Letter from a Gentleman in Fife to a Nobleman he opined that Morton was a fraud, the treatment of the women was "barbarous" and their incarceration "unwarrantable". He added that he considered Thomas Brown was murdered by starvation and that Brown and Cornfoot had been denied Christian burials. The letter indicated responsibility for the events, including the lynching, was the fault of the minister and the bailies. Details of Cornfoot's lynching were given by "A Gentleman from Fife" in a further pamphlet, dated 5 February 1705, entitled An Account of an horrible and barbarous murder. "A Lover of Truth" responded with another essay, A Just Reproof to the False Reports and Unjust Calumnies in the Forgoing Letters, asserting officials had not transgressed and challenging the claims made. (Note: The editor, David Webster, who collated and reproduced the various pamphlets in a book during 1820, noted his suspicion that Cowper was involved in the writing of the Just Reproof essay.) The method of Cornfoot's death was particularly unusual because, in Scotland, convicted witches were usually strangled at the stake before having their bodies burned, although there are instances where they were burned alive.

The murder was investigated by a committee of five members of the aristocracy, including the Earl of Rothes, chosen by the Privy Council a fortnight later. The Privy Council ordered Sir James Stewart to act on the committee's report it received on 15 February and start legal proceedings against five people plus anyone else who had been involved in Cornfoot's lynching; they were to be tried in Edinburgh. Charges were also to be levelled against the burgh magistrates for "suffering such tumults and rabbles and other such outrages to be committed within their burgh".

Four locals had been identified by the committee as witnessing Cornfoot being killed and being involved in her mistreatment although the three main perpetrators, who had by then left the area, were an Orcadian, a man from Burntisland and a Sea captain's son. A schoolboy, two Englishmen and another person were also implicated but had absconded. The committee determined that Bailie Cook, whose residence the mob had seized Cornfoot from, should carry a significant amount of the blame. Four males suspected of being present at the murder were held in custody but were released by Cowper in defiance of the Privy Council's instruction for them to be taken to Edinburgh for trial.

Layng moved away from Pittenweem for a short time, but returned to her home early in 1705. In May that year she described how she had been tortured during her incarceration and, fearing the villagers might subject her to violence similar to that enacted against Cornfoot, asked the Privy Council to afford her some protection. The burgh council and bailie refused to comply with the Privy Council's instructions to provide a bond to safeguard her, claiming she might be attacked at night and they would be unaware of it. The Privy Council also ordered that further investigations into the incidents surrounding Cornfoot's murder should be made, appointing a committee of three noblemen to undertake the task. The committee failed to attend a scheduled meeting on 9 May and, despite being reminded five months later that a report was required, no records exist to show any further investigations were made. None of the culprits were tried for Cornfoot's murder.

== Aftermath ==
After the Privy Council was abolished by the Parliament of Great Britain in 1708 a structure of circuit courts was established in the same year with the hearing of witchcraft cases becoming part of its remit. So when Cowper and the minister from the nearby parish of Anstruther East, William Wadroper, brought charges of witchcraft against Layng and Lawson again in October 1708, it was heard by the circuit court in Perth a few weeks later. The two women were cautioned and released but the pair of ministers continued to bring prosecutions against them resulting in Layng and Lawson being imprisoned again in April 1709 until they could be tried on 20 May. Queen Anne issued an Act of Indemnity following the Jacobite rising in 1708 that anyone due to stand trial for crimes committed before 19 April 1709 were to be acquitted, pardoned, released, and discharged so, along with hundreds of others accused of a diverse set of offences, Layng and Lawson were pardoned and set free.

During 1710 Horseburgh raised an action for wrongful imprisonment against two of the bailies, William Bell and Robert Vernour. An admission from Bell was issued on 28 October 1710 stating: "I am convinced of the rashness, illegality and unwarrantableness of our proceedings, having proceeded on idle stories;" he also asked for forgiveness from God and Horseburgh, acknowledging he had maligned a guiltless person. His apology included that he thought Morton had been "labouring under a melancholy distemper." Horseburgh was awarded monetary recompense.

== Modern interpretations ==
The case was very similar to that of the Paisley witches in 1697 and another case in Glasgow during 1699. The first resulted in the last mass execution of witches in western Europe, but in the second the Privy Council opined there was not sufficient evidence for a trial. Afflictions suffered by Morton and the adolescents making the accusations in those cases resembled ones seen in the children involved with the Salem witch trials; academic, Brian P. Levack, stated that Morton's ailments "followed a script that was part of late seventeenth-century Calvinist religious culture."

The historian Lizanne Henderson described the events surrounding the case of the Pittenweem witches as "one of the most extraordinary and truly horrific outbursts of witch persecution". It was the last significant spate of witch hunting in Fife.

Artist Carolyn Sutton produced an exhibition on thirteen accused witches in 2023, including Janet Cornfoot, called Witches in Words, Not Deeds at the Edinburgh Central Library.

In 2020, Australian author Karen Brooks released the novel “The Darkest Shore”, a fictionalised account of the persecution on the Pittenweem witches.

== Proposed memorial ==
In March 2012, the local community council invited local residents to vote on a proposal for a memorial: one possible design was for a tall metal sculpture in the shape of a door which would have recalled the method of Cornfort's killing with heavy boulders being loaded up on a door which had been placed on her body. In the event the proposal was rejected and The Scotsman reported a historian as saying that decision had been influenced by the church and "they are not budging on it". It was also reported that some of the residents who were eligible to vote were descendants of the members of the lynch mob.
