= Pittenweem Parish Church and Tolbooth Steeple =

Municipal building in Pittenweem, Scotland

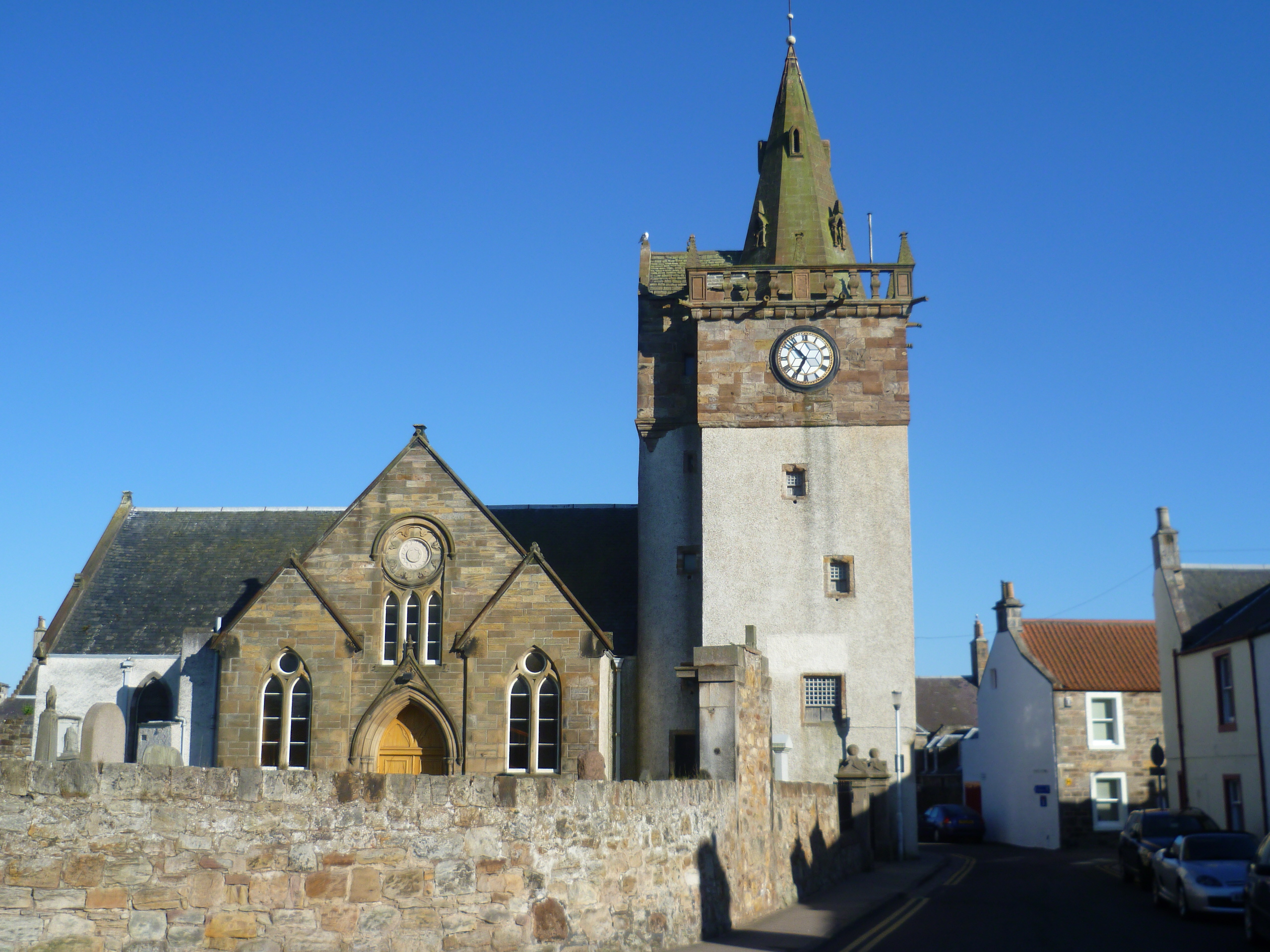
- Pittenweem Parish Church and Tolbooth Steeple

- Shown in Fife
- 56.2138°N 2.7285°W
- Location: High Street, Pittenweem

History
- Built: 1588

Site notes
- Architectural style: Scottish medieval style

Listed Building – Category A
- Official name: Pittenweem Parish Church
- Designated: 18 August 1972
- Reference no.: LB39868

Pittenweem Parish Church and Tolbooth Steeple is an ecclesiastical and municipal complex in the High Street, Pittenweem, Fife, Scotland. The structure, which is used as the local parish church, is a Category A listed building.

== History ==
The site was first occupied by the priory church of Pittenweem Priory which dated back to the 12th century. After Pittenween became a Royal burgh in 1541, the new burgh leaders decided to commission a tolbooth on a site to the immediate west of the priory church. The new tolbooth was designed in the Scottish medieval style, built in harled rubble with sandstone dressings and was completed in 1588. The design of the tolbooth involved a four-stage tower facing down the High Street; there was a doorway in the first stage and irregularly placed narrow windows in the other three stages. A fifth stage, built in ashlar stone, with a corbelled and balustraded parapet and a spire was added in 1630. Access to the upper floors was attained by way of a circular stair turret which was erected at the north east corner of the tower. Internally, the principal rooms were the barrel vaulted prison cell on the ground floor of the tower and the council chamber on the first floor. A bell, which was cast at Jurgen Putensen's foundry in Stockholm, was installed in the tolbooth in 1663.

In 1704, five local women were accused of taking part in the bewitching of a teenage boy, Patrick Morton, and were incarcerated and tortured in the tolbooth. One of the accused, Janet Cornfoot, confessed after being beaten by the local Presbyterian Minister, Patrick Cowper, then escaped and was promptly caught and crushed to death by a lynch mob.

A new weather vane was added in 1739 and a clock, designed and manufactured by a local clockmaker, John Smith, was installed in the fifth stage of the tolbooth in 1773. The main section of the church was rebuilt to a design by a local architect, James Brown, in 1882. The layout of the church was orientated from southwest to northeast with a northwest transept of three-bays facing onto Marygate. The central bay of the northwest transept featured an arched doorway on the ground floor with a tri-partite mullioned window on the first floor surmounted by an oculus and a gable; the outer bays of the transept were fenestrated by bi-partite mullioned windows surmounted by smaller oculi and lower gables.

After the tolbooth became unsuitable for use as a municipal building, a new town hall was erected in Session Street in 1940, and the tower subsequently became an integral part of the parish church. In July 2021, Fife Council, having secured ecclesiastical listed building consent as well as funding by Historic Environment Scotland, initiated a programme of restoration works on the tower.

== See also ==
- List of listed buildings in Pittenweem, Fife
- List of Category A listed buildings in Fife
