= Gaston Vuillier =

French painter

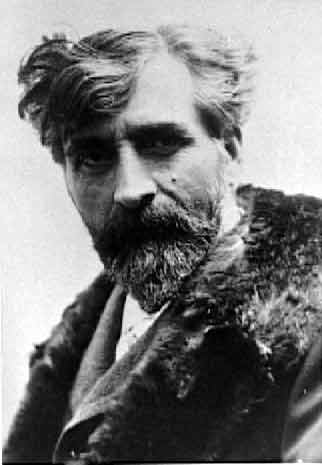
Gaston Vuillier (c.1900)

Gaston Charles Vuillier (7 October 1845, Perpignan – 2 February 1915, Gimel-les-Cascades) was a French painter, designer, traveller and ethnographer. He was employed by many of the major periodicals and journals of the time; including Le Tour du monde and Le Monde illustré.

== Biography ==
His father, Paul Vuillier, was a blacksmith from Aude, where he spent most of his childhood. Later, he attended a boarding school in Perpignan. He originally studied to be a lawyer, and worked as a notary, but his desire to be an artist asserted itself, and he enrolled at the École des Beaux-Arts de Marseille. It was, however, while serving with the French Army in Algeria that he made his final decision to become a painter, which led to studies with Emmanuel Lansyer in Paris.

In 1878, having just presented his first exhibition at the Salon, he applied for a position at the Maison Hachette, where he interviewed with Édouard Charton and was hired as an illustrator for their magazines. During his many travels throughout Europe, on his own as well as on assignments, he became acquainted with Archduke Ludwig Salvator of Austria, a noted researcher of the Mediterranean region. This resulted in his working with the folklorist, Giuseppe Pitré. These encounters created a lifelong interest in ethnography. For many years after his death, he would be better known for his work in that field than as an artist.

In 1892, fascinated by the natural scenery there, he settled in Gimel-les-Cascades, and would later be a staunch advocate for protecting the waterfalls that gave the area its name. He also acted as a landscape designer, adorning the area with walkways, observation sites, gates and trees. Ultimately, despite opposition from local business interests, he was successful in preventing the construction of a dam upriver.

He also created large, thoroughly researched works on Dance Through the Ages (1898) and Pleasures and Games (1900). In his final years, he focused on illustrating classics by Prosper Mérimée, Pierre Louys and François-René de Chateaubriand, among others.

== Selected works ==
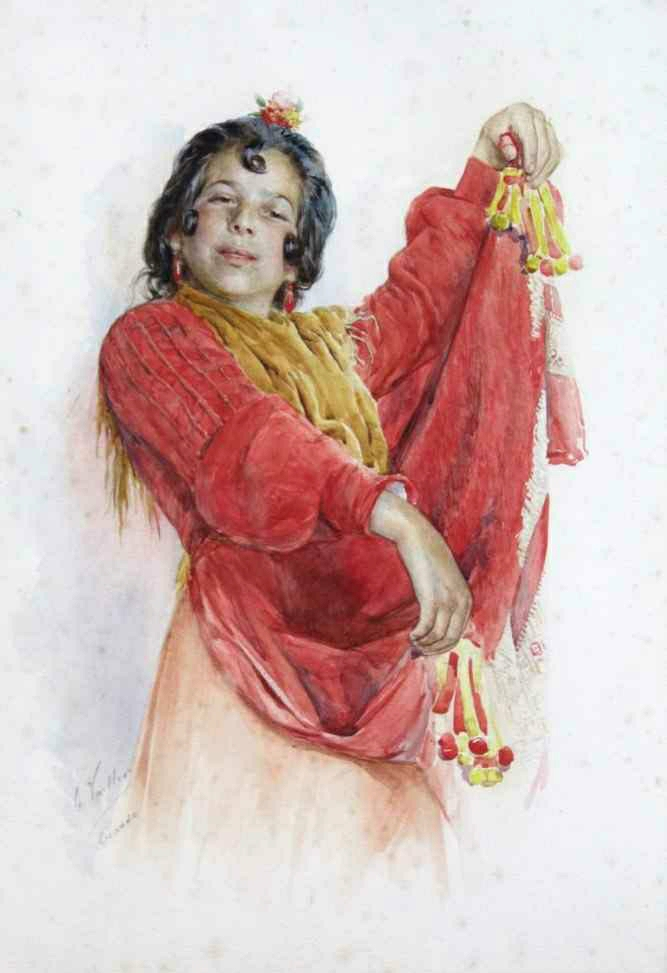
A Female Dancer

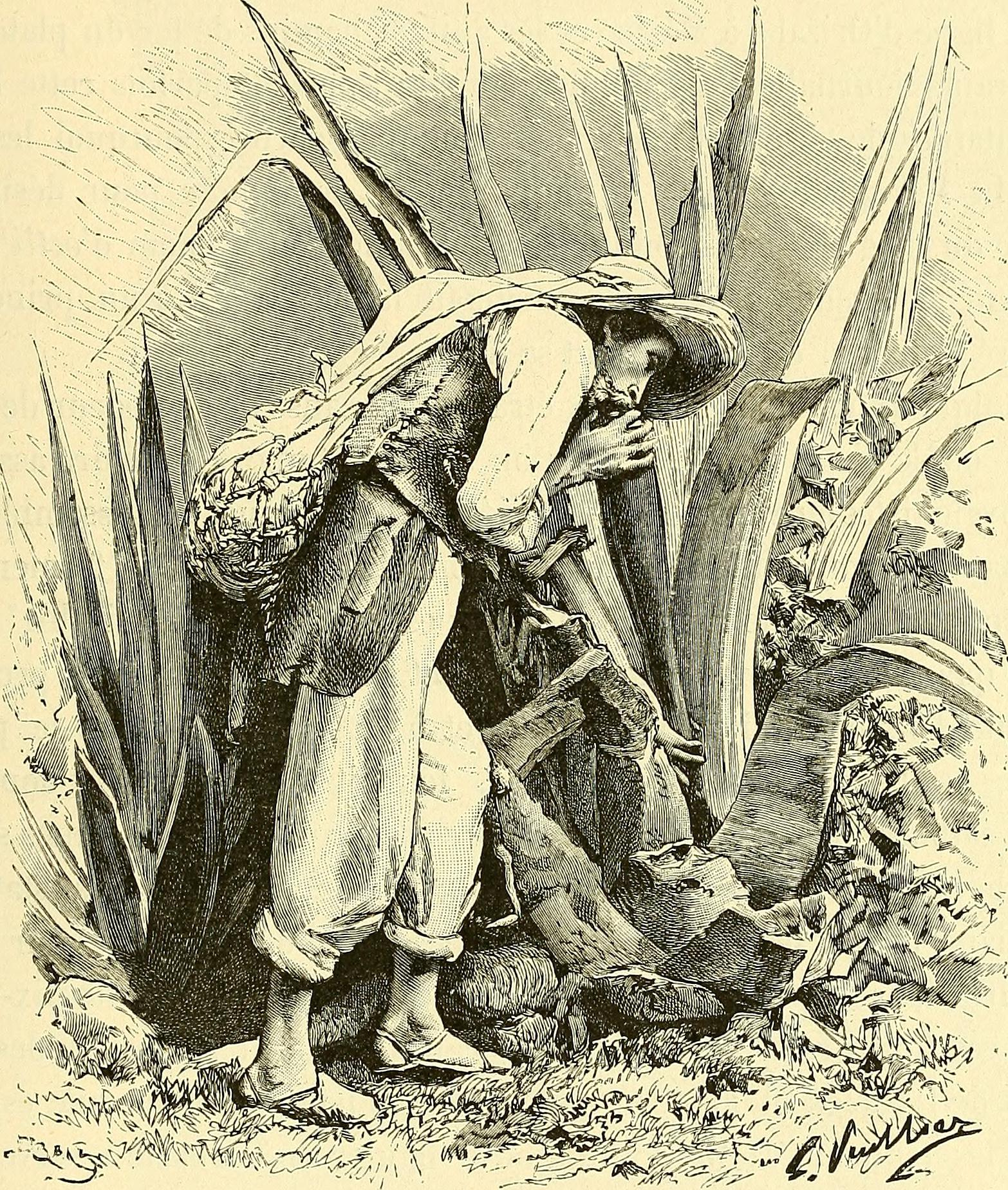
Pulquero

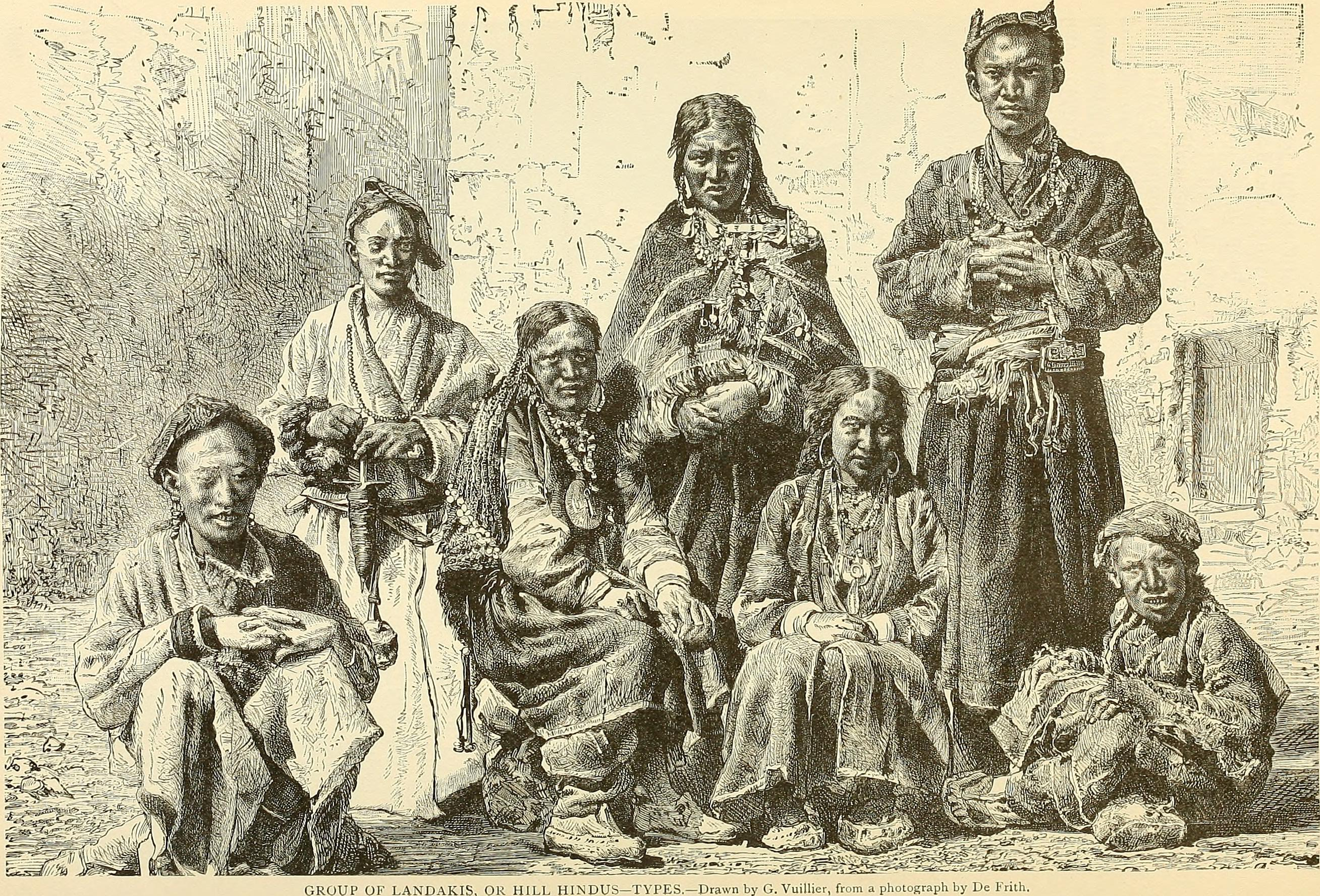
Landakis, or Hill Hindus

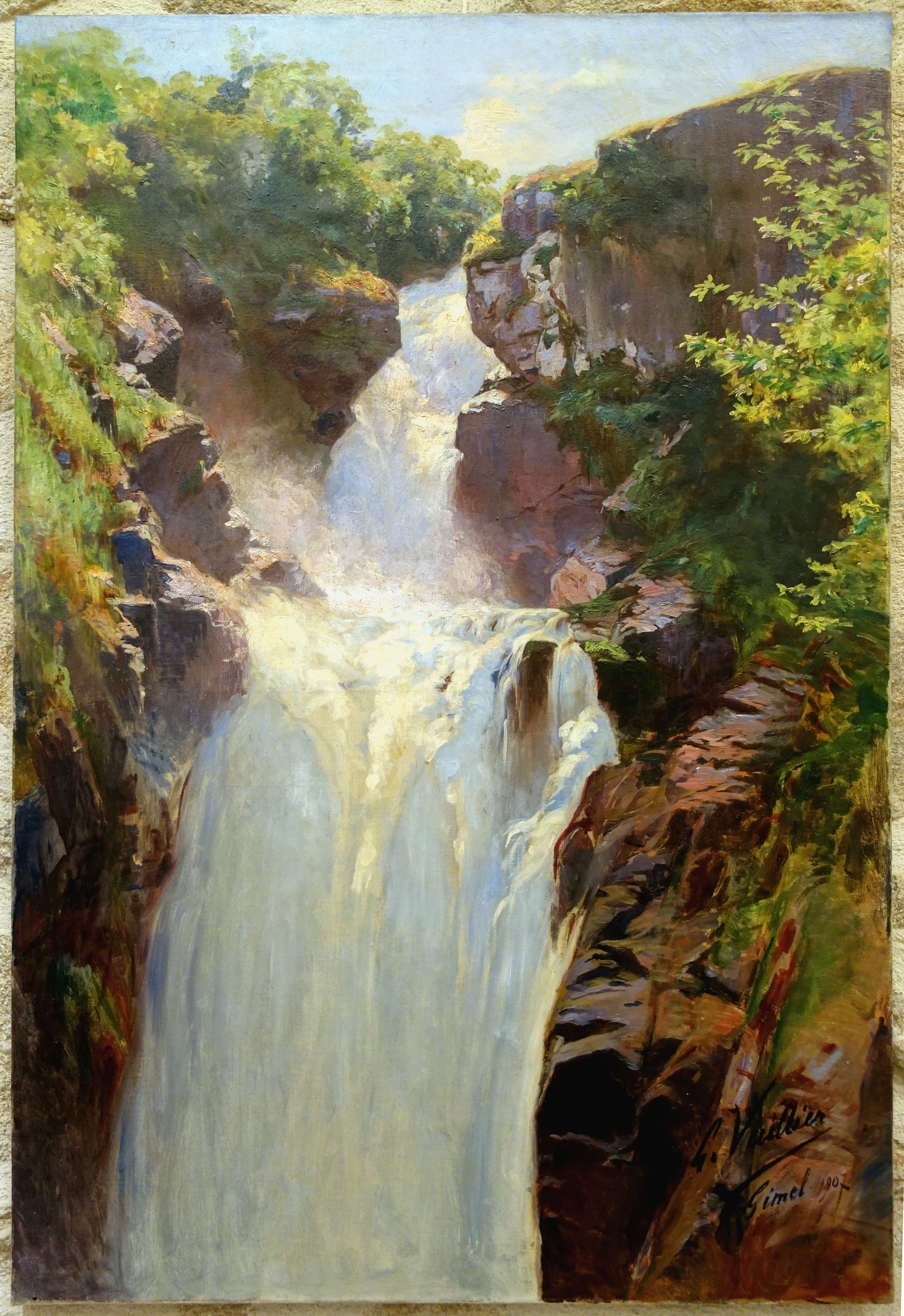
The Grand Cascade
at Gimel
