= Édouard Charton =

French literary figure (1807–1890)

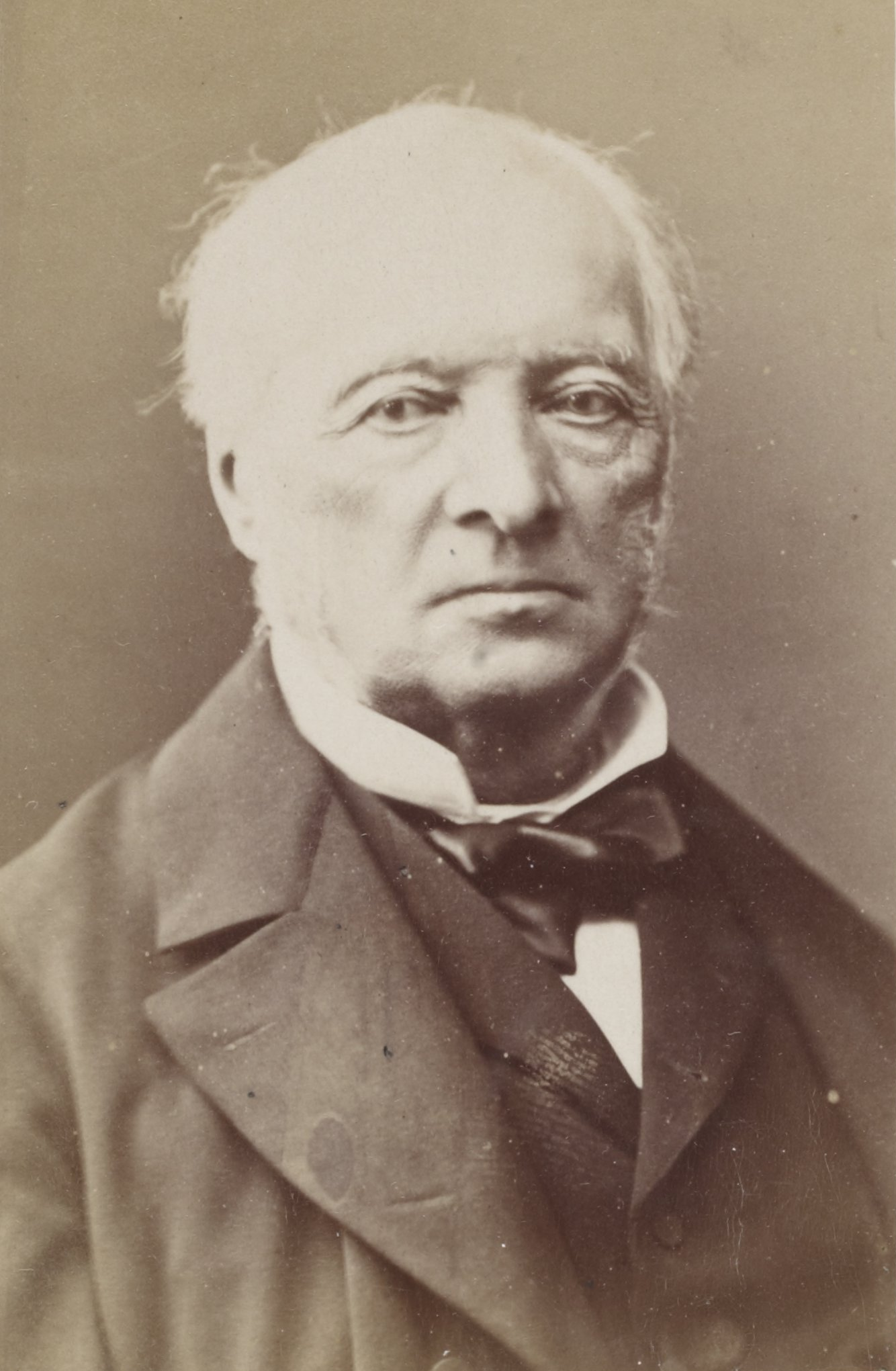
- Édouard Charton in 1883, by Truchelhut & Valkman
- Born: 11 May 1807; Sens, Bourgogne, France
- Died: 27 February 1890 (aged 82); Versailles

Academic background
- Influences: Claude Henri de Rouvroy, comte de Saint-Simon; Louis Claude de Saint-Martin

Academic work
- Notable works: L'Illustration

Édouard Charton (French pronunciation: [edwaʁ ʃaʁtɔ̃]; 11 May 1807 – 27 February 1890) was a French literary figure who founded the magazine Le Magasin pittoresque, and served as its editor-in-chief for fifty-five years (1833–88). He also served as director of publication of the French publisher Hachette for thirty years (1860–90).

== Biography ==
Édouard Charton was born in Sens, Bourgogne and received a lawyer degree at 20 years old. Two years later, between 1829 and 1831, he became a traveling propagator for the social philosophy of Saint-Simonism, using his oratorical skills to promote the cause. However, this ultimately resulted in disappointment for him.

In his mid-forties, Charton entered politics and served in the National Assembly of France as a Deputy and Senator. There, he expressed his convictions, which were influenced by the Age of Enlightenment and included faith in progress and the emancipation of people through education. Charton also advocated for respect for human dignity and fought for the dissemination of knowledge and political action in favor of liberal and republican ideas.

He reaffirmed the moral values acquired within his family and found inspiration in the works of Louis Claude de Saint-Martin, the mystic who used "Unknown Philosopher" as his pen name. He also gathered experience in philanthropy, worked to discover the problems involved in the social condition of man, tested solutions, and worked for what he felt were noble causes, establishing durable and useful friendships with men who shared common ideals.

The first edition of his best known publication (1843)

In 1833 he put into effect his ideals of "fighting ignorance" by starting a new publication Le Magasin pittoresque (pittoresque means that the publication was illustrated). He was inspired by the British Penny Magazine. He remained director of the successful enterprise until 1888, past his eightieth birthday. For more than a half-century, he always pursued the same aims, while collecting and writing texts, selecting wood-engravings, and supervising the printing and distribution of what he referred to as an "out-of-order encyclopedia".

Applying the same rigor and consistency, he chose the best collaborators to propagate practical knowledge while stimulating curiosity and forming artistic tastes. L'Illustration, a renowned pictorial review, created in 1843 on his initiative, lasted a century (to 1944). In 1860, he embarked upon a working partnership with Louis Hachette and his successors, which would continue for the remaining thirty years of his life. It gave him the opportunity to reach new readers with the travel and exploration review Le Tour du Monde (World Tour) and the scientific publication Bibliothèque des merveilles (Library of Wonders).

Based on his belief that man could improve and progress through the acquisition of knowledge, Charton applied his considerable efforts disseminating "practical knowledge" to the greatest number, using his great writing talent only to inform and provide moral guidance. After the French Revolution of 1848, his friend Hippolyte Carnot, who was appointed the Minister of Public Instruction and Religion, recruited Charton as Secretary General of the Ministry. It was the beginning of his political career.

Although an opponent of Napoleon III's 1852 Second Empire, Charton adapted to the circumstances, without ever denying his Republican convictions. He promoted public reading with the creation of popular libraries, participated in the creation of the Paris Museum of Anthropology and showed throughout his life a consistency of behavior as testified by his friends and two generations of colleagues.

He was described as a man of action able to overcome his anxiety-ridden personal nature. Faithful in friendship, he maintained relations with those who shared his belief in the moral progress of man, whereby the progress of each individual led to the progress of humanity as a whole. In the National Assembly, he remained in the background despite his talents as a speaker. When he did take the floor, it was to raise crucial points speak concerning questions of education, fine arts and the press, as well as to express his opposition to the death penalty.

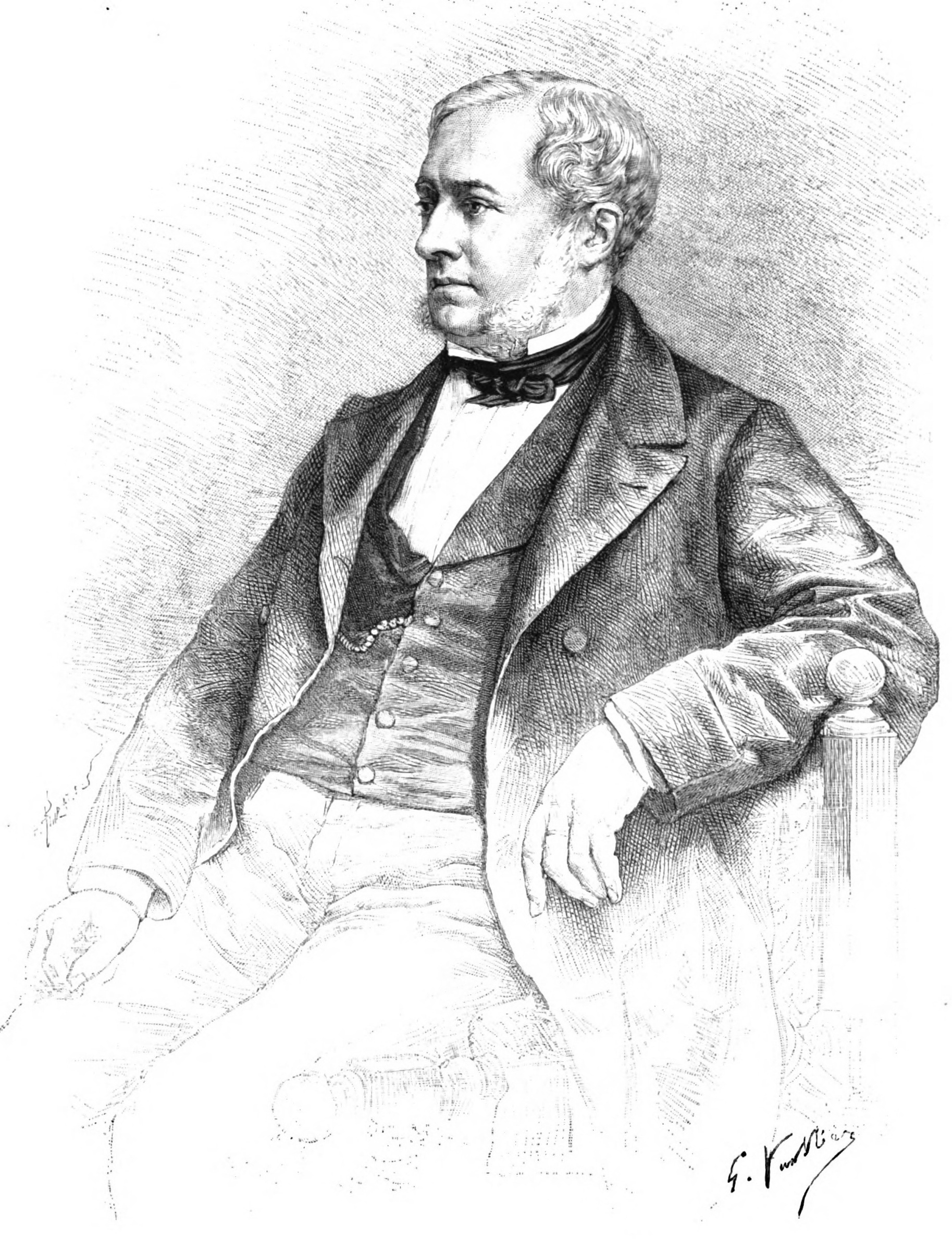
Posthumous portrait by Gaston Vuillier

Encouraging his colleagues to reach a consensus, he could also remain firm and intransigent on points of principle. During the Second Empire, he turned down the post of director of the Comédie française which would have necessitated swearing an oath to the Emperor. Political misalliances prevented him from attaining what would have been the crowning glories of his life—serving as Head of Administration, or as Minister of Fine Arts, both opportunities to demonstrate his organizational talents.

Édouard Charton died in Versailles at the age of 82.
