= Elephant sword =

Edged weapon attached to a tusk

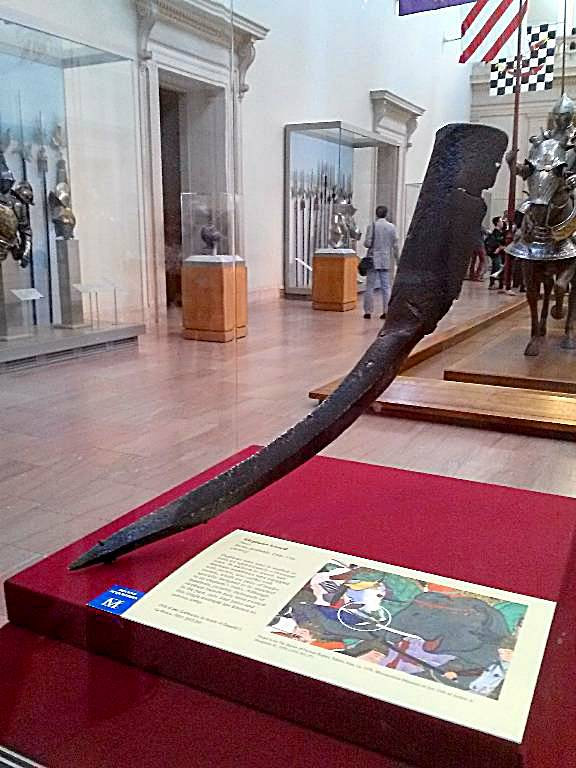
Indian elephant sword on display at the Metropolitan Museum of Art, two feet (61 cm) long

An elephant sword, also called a tusk sword, is an edged weapon designed to be attached to the tip of a war elephant's tusk, normally used in pairs.

War elephants were used for centuries, primarily from Indian subcontinent to the Middle East, and were often armored. Made of iron or steel, elephant swords were probably used from a relatively early date. Over a thousand years ago, elephants equipped with steel-tipped tusks were reportedly effectively used in battle. An elephant could toss an enemy in the air and cut him in two. Sometimes the blades were coated with poison. The Russian merchant Afanasii Nikitin recorded the use of these weapons in India in the 15th century. A Persian illustration titled "The Battle of Pashan Begins" from the Shahnama (Book of Kings) of Shah Tahmasp, from Tabriz circa 1530s, shows an elephant in battle equipped with elephant swords (the battle depicted occurred centuries earlier).

It is possible that thousands of elephant swords were manufactured over a large span of time, but only four pairs, plus a single specimen are known to exist today. Of these, two of the pairs are associated with the Mysore Arsenal and their rather light construction suggests they may have been intended to be decorative. Another pair is in the Ganga Golden Junilee Museum while the fourth is held by the Royal Armouries Museum. The unpaired specimen is held by the Metropolitan Museum of Art. Two further tusk swords survived until at least 1912 in the collection of Henri Moser-Charlottenfels.
