= Louis Rousselet =

French traveller, writer, photographer and pioneer of the darkroom

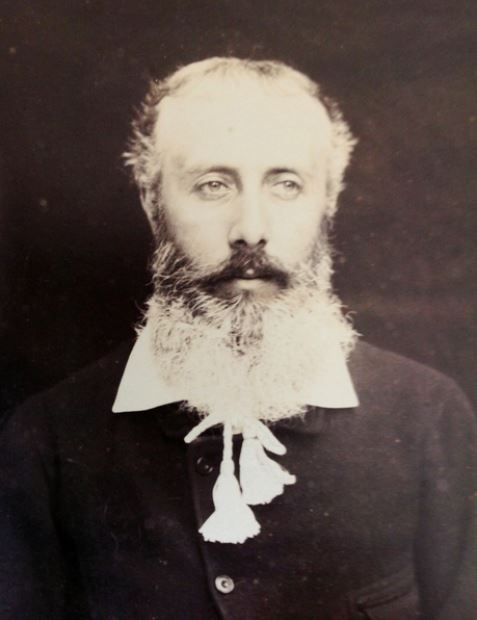
- Louís Rousselet ca. 1910
- Born: 15 May 1845; Perpignan, France
- Died: 19 November 1929 (aged 84); Vineuil, Loir-et-Cher, France
- Citizenship: France
- Occupations: Traveller, Author, Photographer, Archaeologist
- Spouse: Thérèse Trotignon (1853-1944)
- Children: 4
- Writing career
- Language: French

Louis-Théophile Marie Rousselet (1845–1929) was a French traveller, writer, photographer and pioneer of the darkroom. His photographic work now commands high prices. Many of his drawings and photographs were made into engravings by others.

== Life ==
The son of a wealthy Freight forwarder, an only child; he was educated in Paris and Heidelberg. He made ethnological and archaeological explorations in India and the Himalayas, He travelled to Morocco, and was a Secretary of the Society of Anthropology of Paris. His travels have inspired several books. He made various archaeological expeditions in the southern French department of Pyrénées-Orientales.

== Travels in India ==
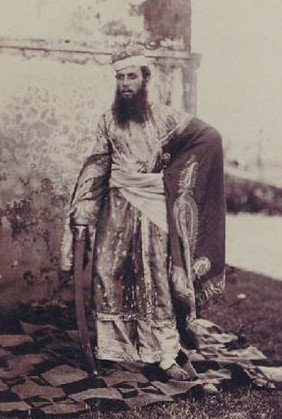
Portrait of Louís Rousselet dressed as an Indian native. 1867

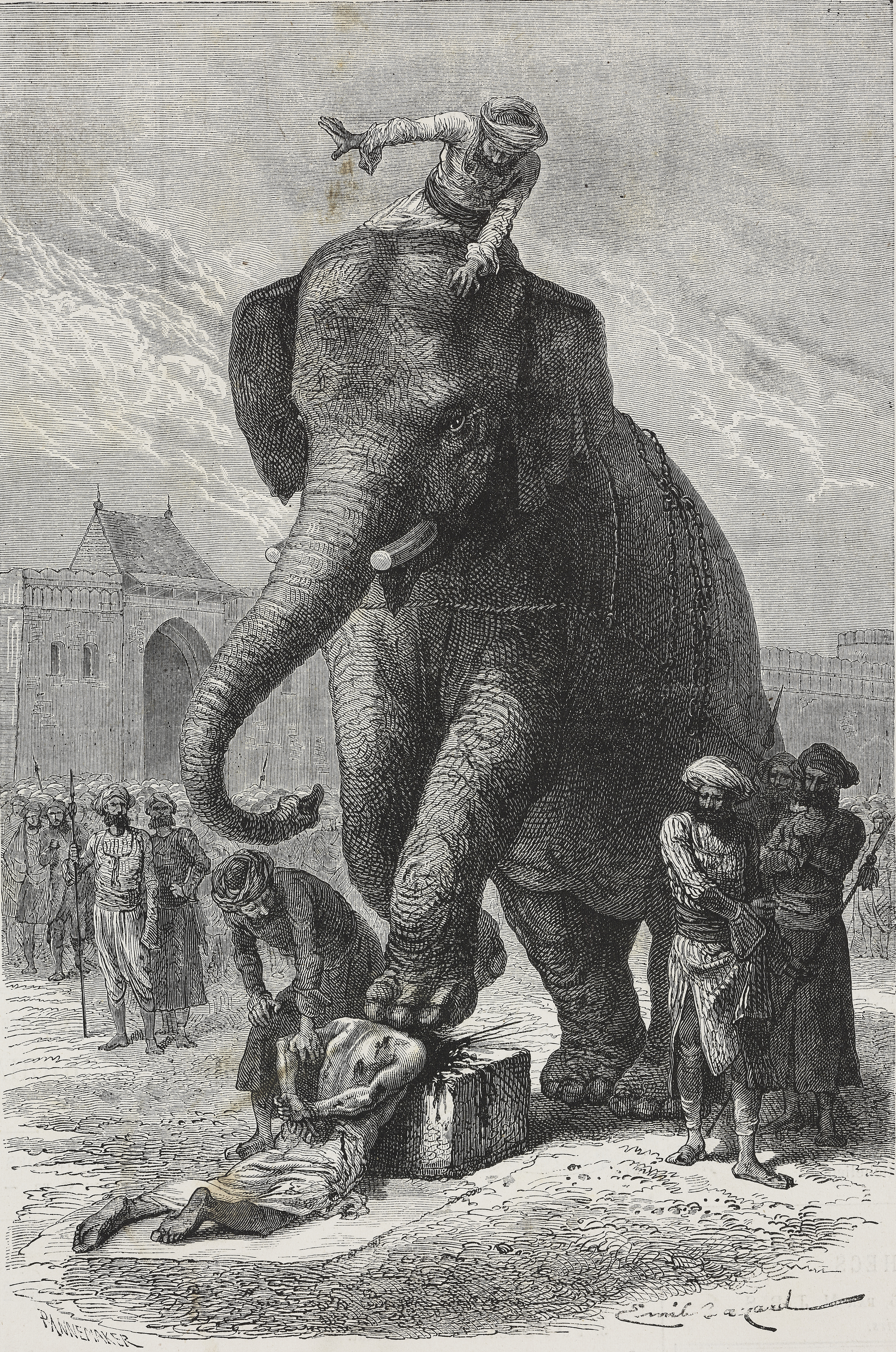
Crushing by Elephant, an execution depicted in Rousselet's "Le Tour du Monde", 1868.

He was in India from 1864 to 1868. He spent much time in central India (Alwar, Baroda, Bhopal, Gwalior, Udaipur and several other cities in Rajasthan).

Roussellet wrote: "On 20 June 1863 I embarked at Marseilles on board the "Vectis", an English steamer bound for the East", he stopped off in Malta, Cairo and Aden, before boarding the "Malta" taking the Suez Canal to Bombay and India, "I intended to mainly visit all the northern region, which includes, besides the English Presidency of Bengal, the feudal states of Rajasthan, the Bundelcund, the Goundwana, The Punjab and the Kingdom of Nepal". He arrived at Bombay on 8 July 1863.

While in Bombay he met "Jules Henri Jean Schaumburg" (1839–1886) a Belgian, who was to be his travelling companion from May 1865 – Sept 1868. Schaumburg was later appointed as an artist to The Geological Survey of India in Calcutta.

His intention was for a 6-month trip but he stayed 4 years. He was only the second photographer (after Samuel Bourne) to do so. Both men's photographs were extensively made into etchings without attribution in many cases worldwide.

On arrival in India he decided to learn photography (October 1865) in order to supplement his diaries. after visiting the ruins at Dabhoi, he realized that his pencil sketches were not doing justice to the beauty of the elaborate architecture and carving. He was to write, "It was on seeing these generally unknown masterpieces at Dubbhoee that I regretted I had not the power of reproducing them by photography, and felt that it would be impossible to continue my explorations profitably without the assistance of that art. As soon, therefore, as I returned to Baroda, I applied myself seriously to learn photography; and with that view I procured from Bombay all the necessary apparatus".

He took more than 600 photographs. On his return to France he published excerpts from his Indian diary along with woodcut illustrations taken mostly from his sketches and photographs in a French weekly journal Le Tour du Monde. Many of the engravings were by Émile Thérond.

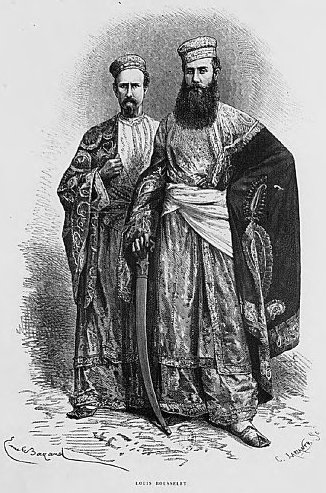
Louís Rousselet with Jules Henri Jean Schaumburg. 1867

He visited the Bir Singh Dev Palace and it's lake Datia (Lala ka Taal) (1867).

When in Bhopal in 1867, the two companions were presented with Sirdar costumes: "The glittering costumes ordered by the Queen consisted of long tunics of green silk gauze embossed with gold; vast petticoat pantaloons of crimson satin embroidered with silver, kumerbunds, or cashmere belts, of violet and gold, cloaks of deep scarlet-coloured cashmere embroidered with gold and silver, and to crown all, toque diadems in fine gold."

He first visited Banaras (Kashi) in Uttar Pradesh and Delhi in 1868.

Rousselet then left India for the last time: "...and on the 1st September 1868, I went on board the "Labourdonnais" ... I had also to say good-bye to my good and faithful companion (Schaumburg), who was detained by fresh projects in the country. My old bearer Devi, the trusty servant who had followed me for two years through so many good and evil fortunes, was there also, melted in tears, and embracing my knees. At last the moment of parting arrived; the bell rang; I saw Schaumburg, and the old bearer pushing off in the boat, and waving me their last adieu."

== After India ==
On return to France, in 1868, he began to work with Goupil & Cie on a publishing project entitled "travel in India ML Rousselet", composed of one hundred sixty photographic plates. This publication, was intended to be prestigious, rare and expensive. Unfortunately the project nearing completion, was abandoned as the Franco-Prussian War of 1870 broke out. Rousselet was then mobilized and Goupil workshops suffered significant damage. However Rousselets extraordinary set of high quality technical and aesthetic quality photographs remained.

In 1873 he became editor-in-chief of Hachette's Le Journal de la jeunesse, a weekly magazine aimed at educating and entertaining youths aged between 10 and 15; the advent of World War I put a stop to it.

He was also director of the new dictionary of universal geography (Hachette), an Academy Officer, and a member of the Society for the Advancement of Science.

The publication in 1875 by Hachette of his journal, The Rajahs of India ("L'Inde des Rajas"), a compilation of his notes, drawings and photographs, was a great success with a large audience. Rousselet was to remain faithful to Hachette thereafter and make a great career.

In 1876 he got married in Paris, to Thérèse Trotignon, they would have four children born in 1877, 1878, 1881, and 1891.

Rousselet's photographs are the most copied images published worldwide of 19th century India.

His photograph collection and travel book L'Inde des Rajahs: Voyage Dans l'Inde Centrale, dans les Presidences de Bombay et du Bengale (1875) documented court life. Other photographs were of monuments and temples.

== Death ==
Rousselet died at Vineuil and was buried at Bourré, Loir-et-Cher, in France.

== Honours ==
Legion of Honour (Chevalier) Palmes Académiques

== Works ==
- L'Inde des Rajas: voyage dans l'Inde centrale et dans les présidences de Bombay et du Bengale (1875)
- India and its Native Princes, éditions Chapman & Hall, 1876
- Les royaumes de l'Inde (1879)

+ " The Son of the Constable of France or the Adventures of Jean de Bourbon" (1882)

- Nouveau dictionnaire de géographie universelle, with Vivien de Saint-Martin
- Au vieux pays de France (1906)
- Sur les confins du Maroc (1912)
- L'Inde: photographies de Louis Rousselet 1865–1868, Musée Goupil, 1992

== Collection ==
- Musée d'Aquitaine, Bordeaux. The museum contains the archives (Musée Goupil) of Goupil & Cie, one of the greatest art dealers and publishers of the 19th century. The collection includes – The India photographs of Louis Rousselet 1865-1868

== Expositions ==
- 1996, Musée des beaux-arts et d'archéologie, Libourne
- 1992, Musée d'Aquitaine

== Gallery of photographs ==
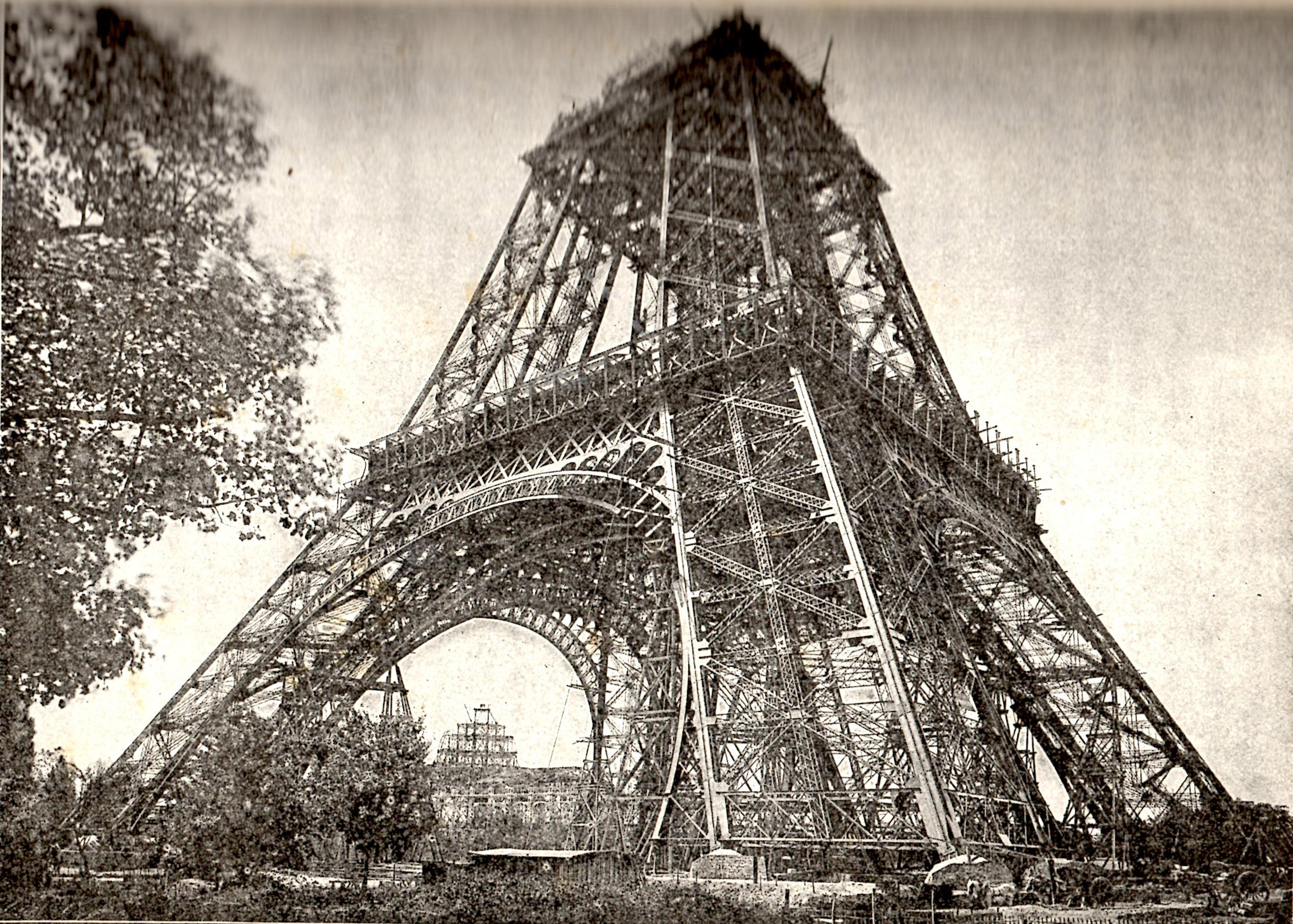
Eiffel Tower under construction (1888)

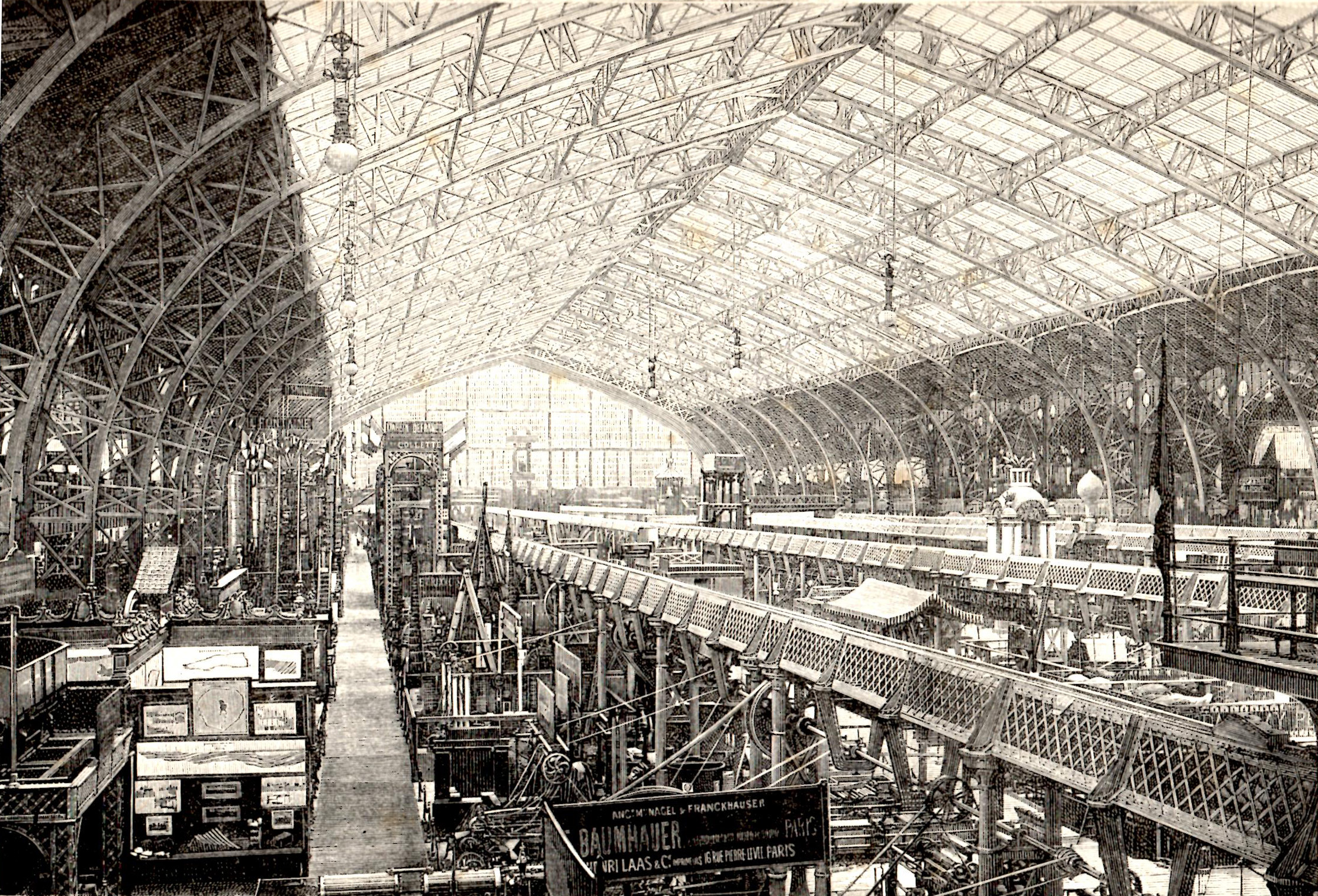
Galerie des Machines de l'Exposition Universelle (1889)

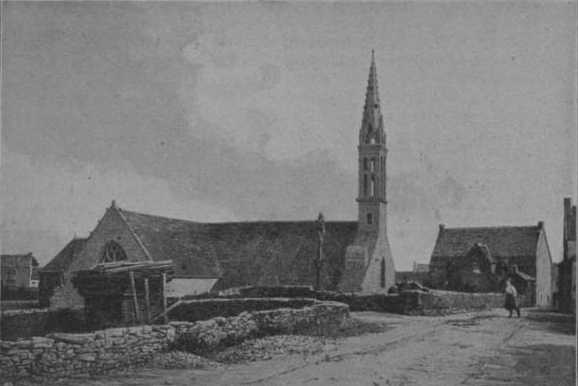
File:Eglise de Plozévet (1899)

== Gallery of works after Rousselet ==
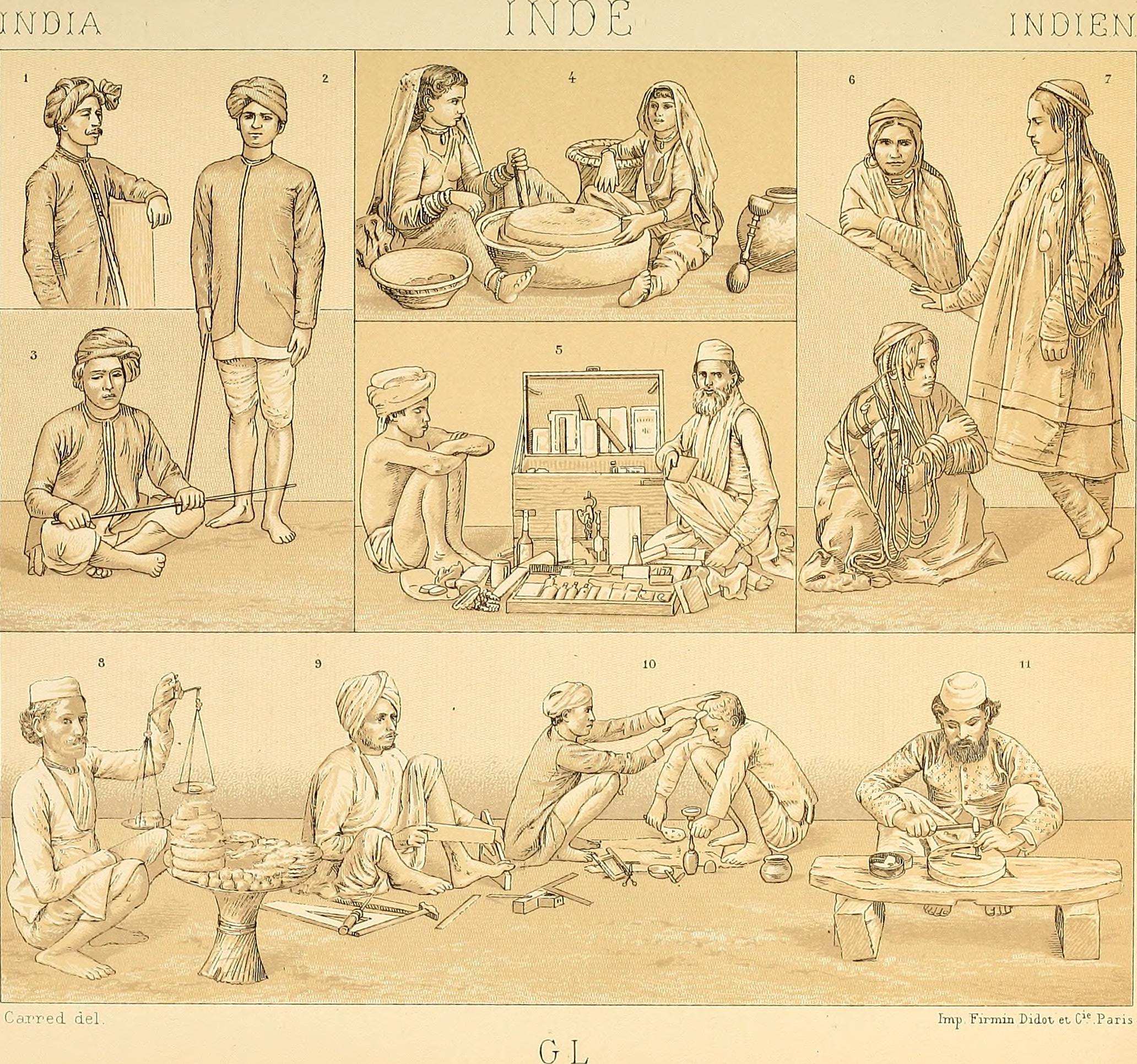
Costumes of India

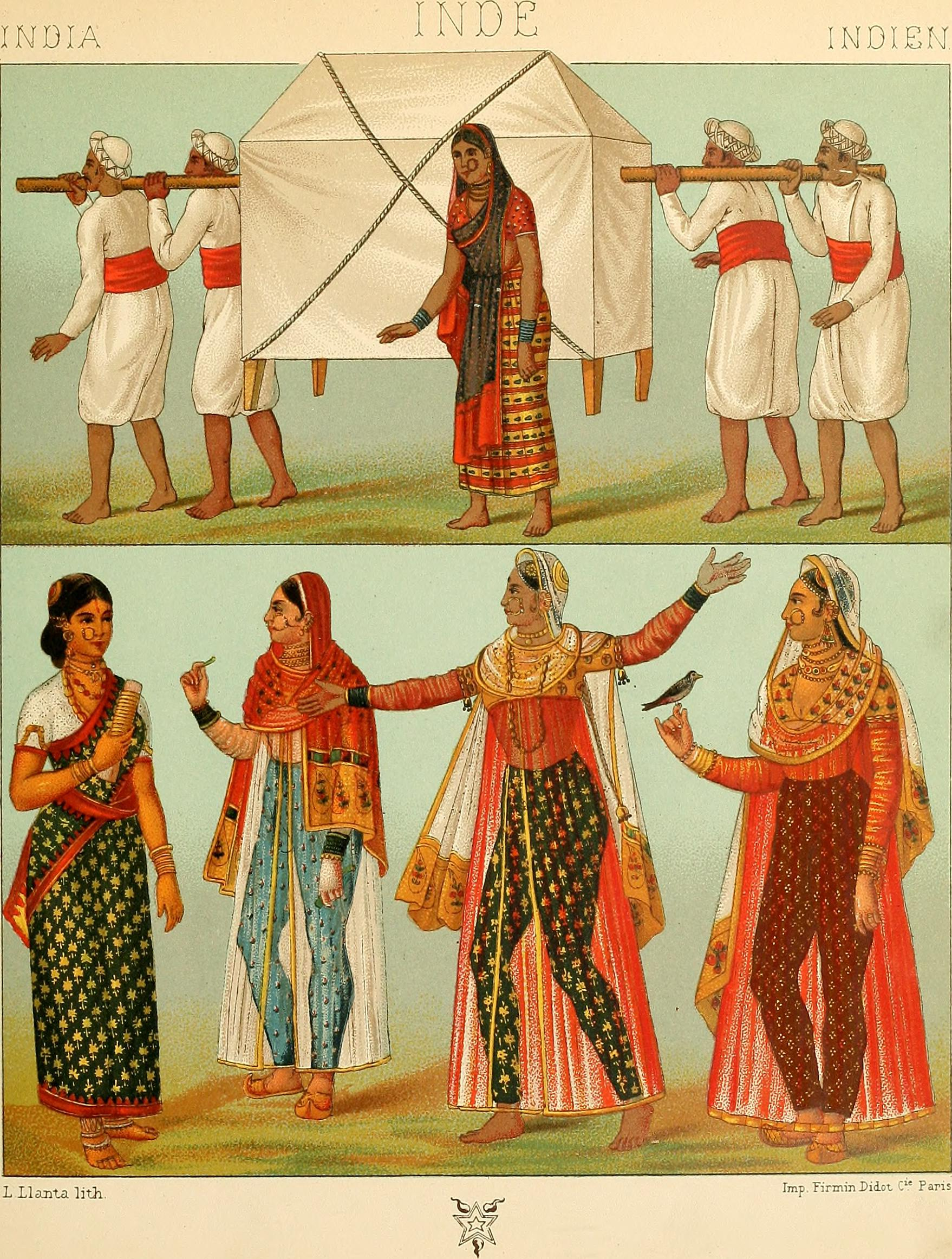
Costumes of India

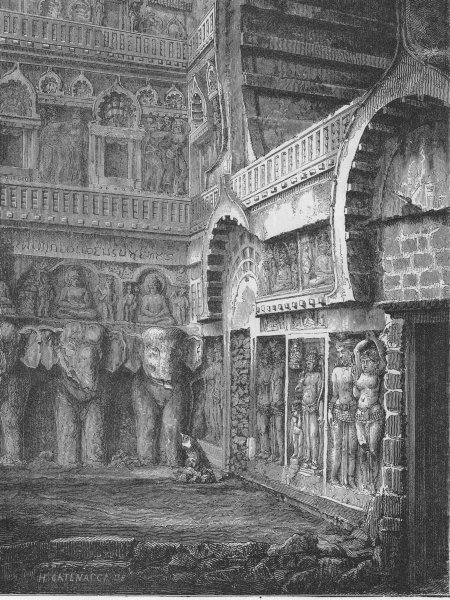
Bas-relief on the left, under the gateway at Karli

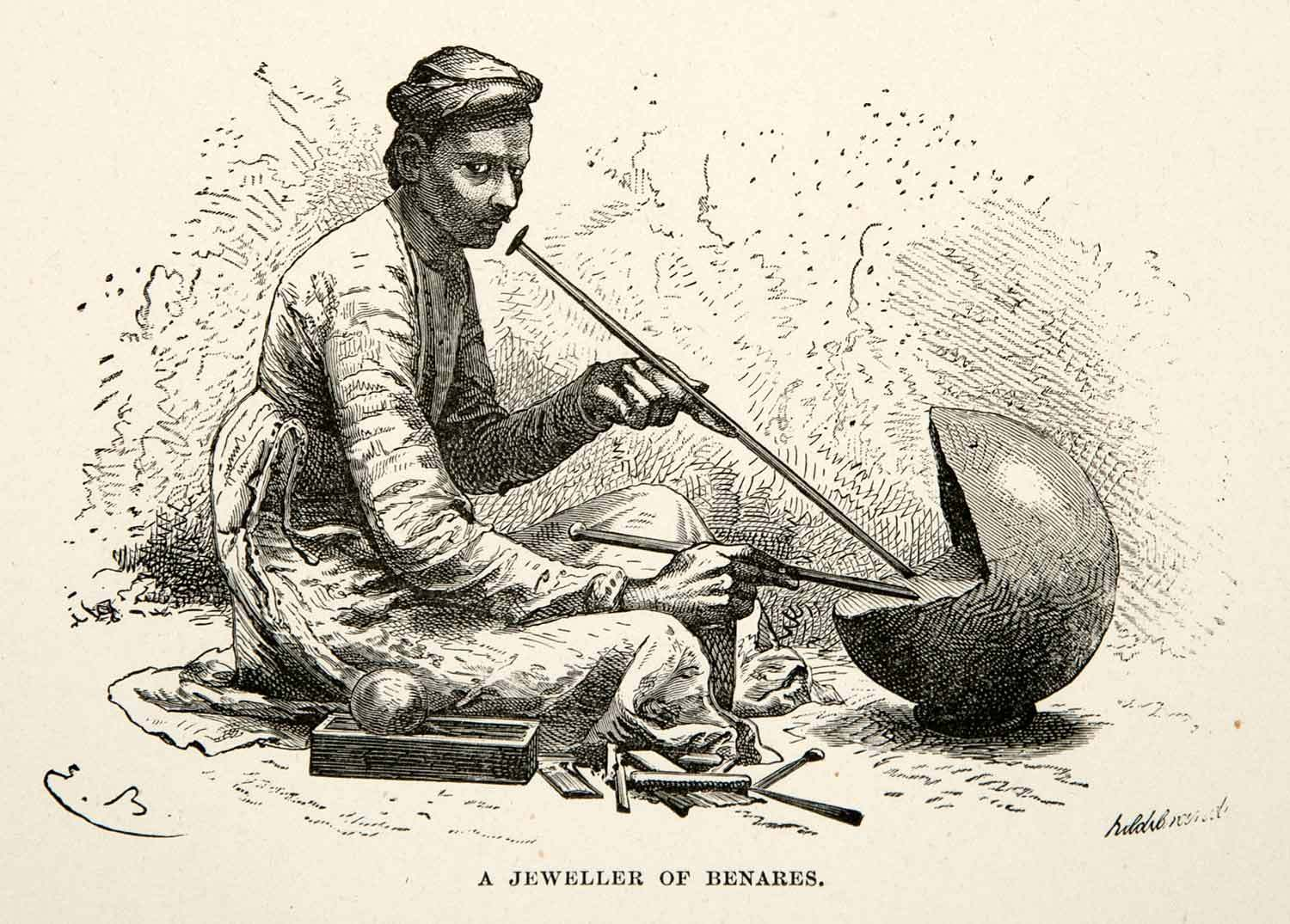
Hindoo Jeweller

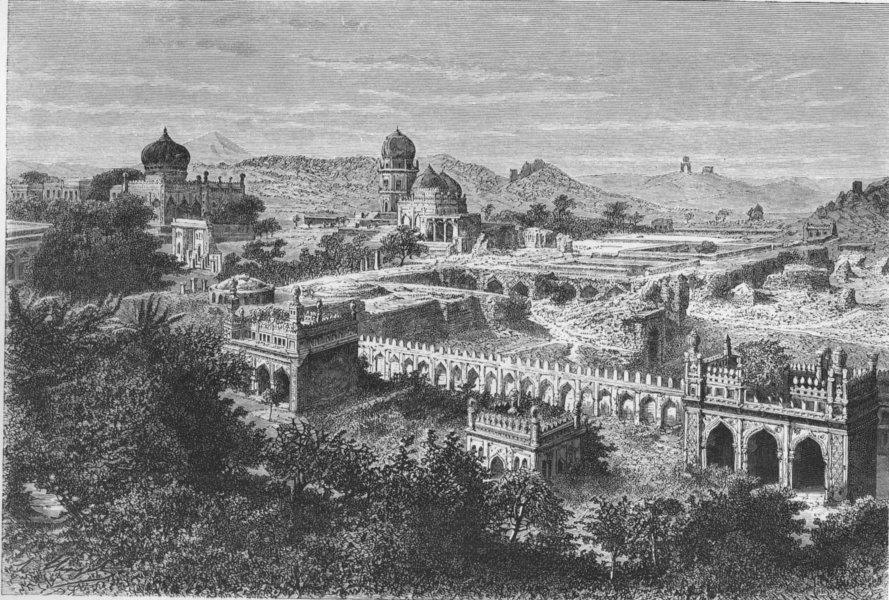
Golconda 1878

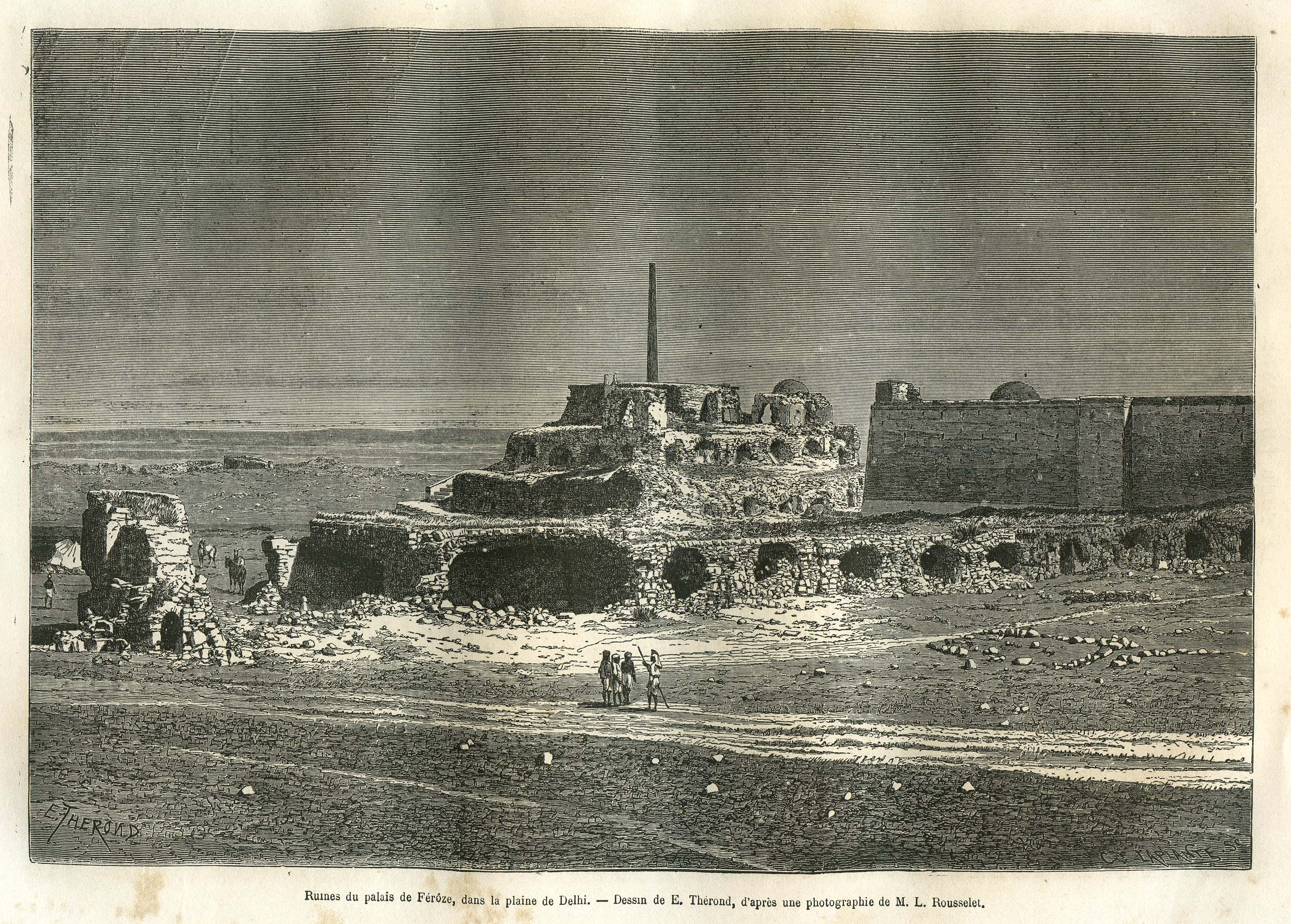
Palace of Feroze, Plains of Delhi

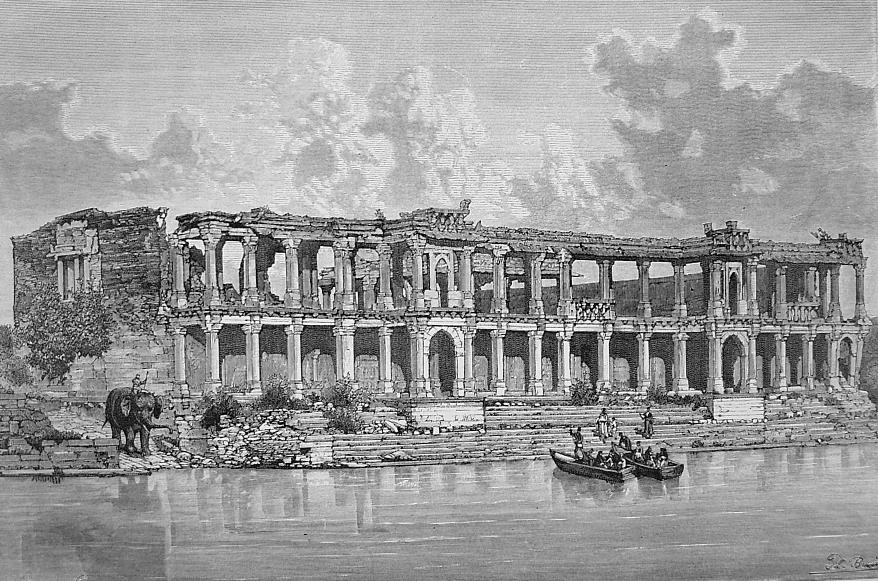
Sarkhej Roza near Ahmedabad

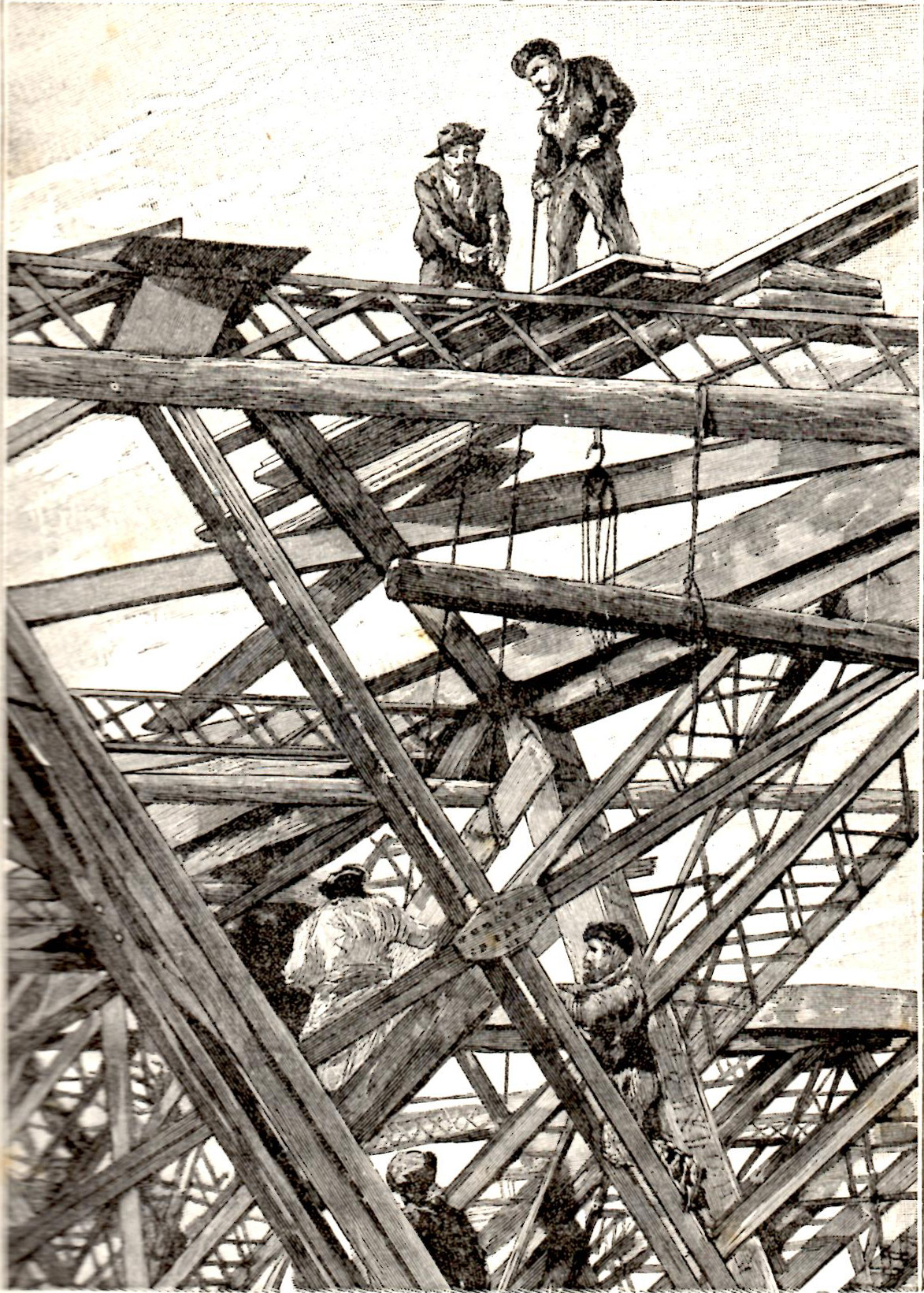
Workers assembling the Eiffel Tower 1889
