= Le Magasin pittoresque =

Illustrated magazine in France (1833–1938)

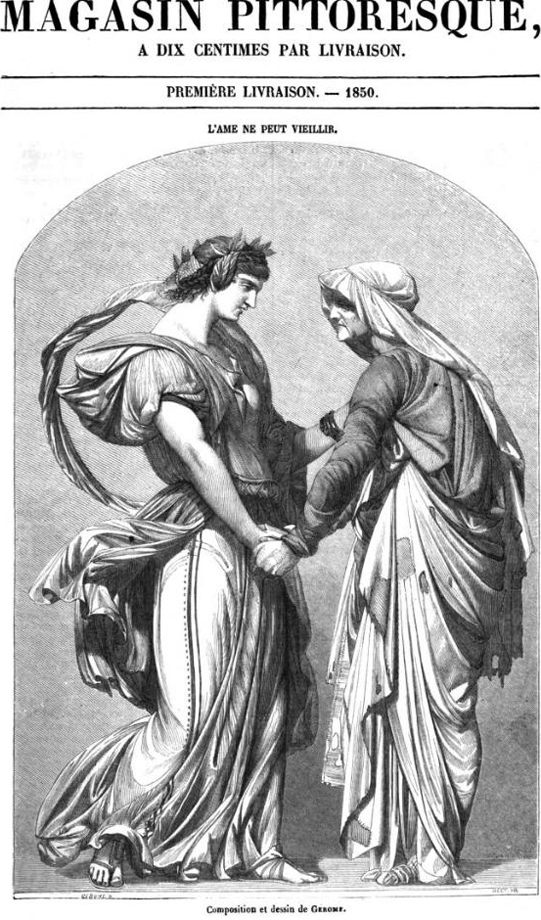
- Editor-in-chief: Édouard Charton
- Categories: Illustrated magazine
- Frequency: Weekly; Bi-monthly; Monthly
- Founder: Édouard Charton
- Founded: 1833
- Final issue: 1938
- Country: France
- Based in: Paris
- Language: French

Le Magasin pittoresque was a French magazine published from 1833 to 1938 and headquartered in Paris, France. It was the first illustrated magazine in the country.

== History and profile ==
Le Magasin pittoresque was launched in 1833. Its founder and editor was Édouard Charton. The magazine was modeled on The Penny Magazine. It was started as a weekly, but later its frequency was switched to bi-monthly and then to monthly. The magazine was headquartered in Paris, France. The topics covered included public administration, human and social sciences, urban planning, architecture, and civil engineering.

In 1834, Le Magasin pittoresque published an article about an automaton, the Mechanical Turk, created by Hungarian inventor Baron Wolfgang von Kempelen and reputed to play chess. The article was the first to expose the machine as a fake.
