= Le Tour du Monde =

French weekly travel journal published 1860–1914

Le Tour du monde
- A cover page from 1862 – Volume 5
- Categories: Travel
- Frequency: Weekly
- Founder: Édouard Charton
- Founded: 1860
- Final issue: 1914
- Country: France
- Based in: Paris
- Language: French

Le Tour du monde, nouveau journal des voyages (French pronunciation: [lə tuʁ dy mɔ̃d nuvo ʒuʁnal de vwajaʒ]) was a French weekly travel journal first published in January 1860. It also bore the name of Le Tour du monde, journal des voyages et des voyageurs (1895–1914).

== History ==
Le Tour du monde (Around the world) was created in January 1860 by Édouard Charton, designer of Le Magasin pittoresque, under the aegis of the Librairie Hachette : every six months, the weekly booklets sold through the network of railway stations, gathered in one volume, which was offered in bookstore. A second series was inaugurated in 1895 under the title Le Tour du monde, journal des voyages et des voyageurs (Around the World, newspaper travel and travelers): much more modern, it reproduced photographic images, rather than engravings.

This weekly was aimed at a popular readership and spent its content on travel and exploration. It described in detail most of the great expeditions which marked the end of the 19th century; and early 20th, the last great period of exploration of the world by Western travelers. Fifty years span from discovering the source of the Nile in the early 1860s, to conquering the South Pole in late 1911. The magazine combined text and illustrations in the early woodcuts, which were gradually replaced by reproductions of photographs at the end of the 19th century. After July 1914, it ceased publication.

In February 1930, the title was bought by Lectures pour tous.

=== The first 52 issues ===
Each edition was at least 16 pages, illustrated with engravings in black and white. On the cover would be found a single engraving under the header that blocked half the page above twin columns of print, sometimes the entire page. Inside, besides half-page prints, there were three full page prints. Text was carried on two columns. Another feature was the publication of the same travelogue in installments over 2 or 3 numbers (hence the discrepancy between editions and numbers).

- Edition No. 1 – Traveler's Death of Adolf Schlagintweit in Turkestan (1857). 16 pages.
- Edition No. 2 – Sir John Franklin and his companions.
- Edition No. 3 – Circumnavigation by the Austrian frigate the Novara (1857–1859).
- Edition No. 4 – The Cochinchina in 1859 – notes from an unpublished correspondence.
- Edition Nos. 5 and 6 – Trip to Albania and Montenegro (1858) by G. Lejean. 32 pages.
- Edition No. 7 – The Amur river – exploration of the river from its source to its mouth.
- Edition Nos. 8, 20 and 21 – Journey to the shores of the Caspian Sea . 48 pages.
- Edition Nos. 9, 10 and 11 – (Baron Gros's) Travels in China and Japan (1857–1858), Moges text, drawings after Treviso Tronson, etc. 48 pages.
- Edition No. 12 – Fragments of a trip to New Orleans (1855) by Élisée Reclus.
- Edition No. 13 – Trip to the Great Viti great equinoctial ocean, John Macdonald (1855), article by Henri Michelant.
- Edition No. 14 – Travels in Morocco (1670-1789-1860).
- Edition No. 15 – Travels of Giovanni Mastai-Ferretti (now His Holiness Pope Pius IX) in South America (Santiago Genoa), 1823–1824).
- Edition No. 16 – Adventures, hunts by Anderson in Southern Africa.
- Edition No. 17 – The Polar Sea: fragments of the journey performed in 1853, 1854 and 1855 New York 82nd degree of latitude by Dr. K. El Kane (Navy of the United States)...
- Edition Nos. 18 and 19 – Captain Palissier's exploration of the Rocky Mountains (1857 to 1859).
- Edition Nos. 20 and 21, Travel to the Caspian Sea and the Black Sea, Baku, Tbilisi. (1858).
- Edition Nos. 22, 23 and 24 – Travels of Möllhausen, Mississippi to the shores of the Pacific Ocean (1853–1854). 48 pages.
- Edition Nos. 25 and 26 – Travels in Palestine (1856–1859): Fifteen days in Jerusalem (1856).
- Edition No. 27 – A month in Sicily (1843) by Félix Bourquelot.
- Edition Nos. 28 and 29 – Journey to Persia, Fragments by Count A. de Gobineau (1855–1858) illustration by Laurens. 32 pages.
- Edition No. 30 – Trips to the West Indies by Anthony Trollope (1858–1859).
- Edition Nos. 31 and 32 – Journey into the Scandinavian states by Paul Riant.
- Edition Nos. 33, 34 and 35 – Journey to Mount Athos by A. Proust (1858). 48 pages.
- Edition No. 36 – Travel with naturalist (Charles Darwin) – Archipelago Galapagos and atolls and coral islands.
- Edition Nos. 37 and 38 – Trip to the Yakuts (Asian Russia) by Ouvarovski (1830–1839).
- Edition Nos. 39, 40 and 41 – Travel and discoveries in Central Africa – diary of Dr. Barth (1849–1855). 48 pages.
- Edition No. 42 – Travel and adventures of Baron de Wogan of California (1850–1852).
- Edition Nos. 43, 44 and 45 – Travel into the kingdom of Ava (Burmese Empire) by Henry Yule captain of the Bengal Engineers. (1855).
- Edition Nos. 46, 47 and 48 – Journey to the great lakes of East Africa by Captain Burton (1857–1859). 48 pages
- Edition No. 49 – Travel to Cuba by Richard Dana (1859).
- Edition Nos. 50, 51 and 52 – Excursions in Dauphiné (1850–1860). 48 pages.

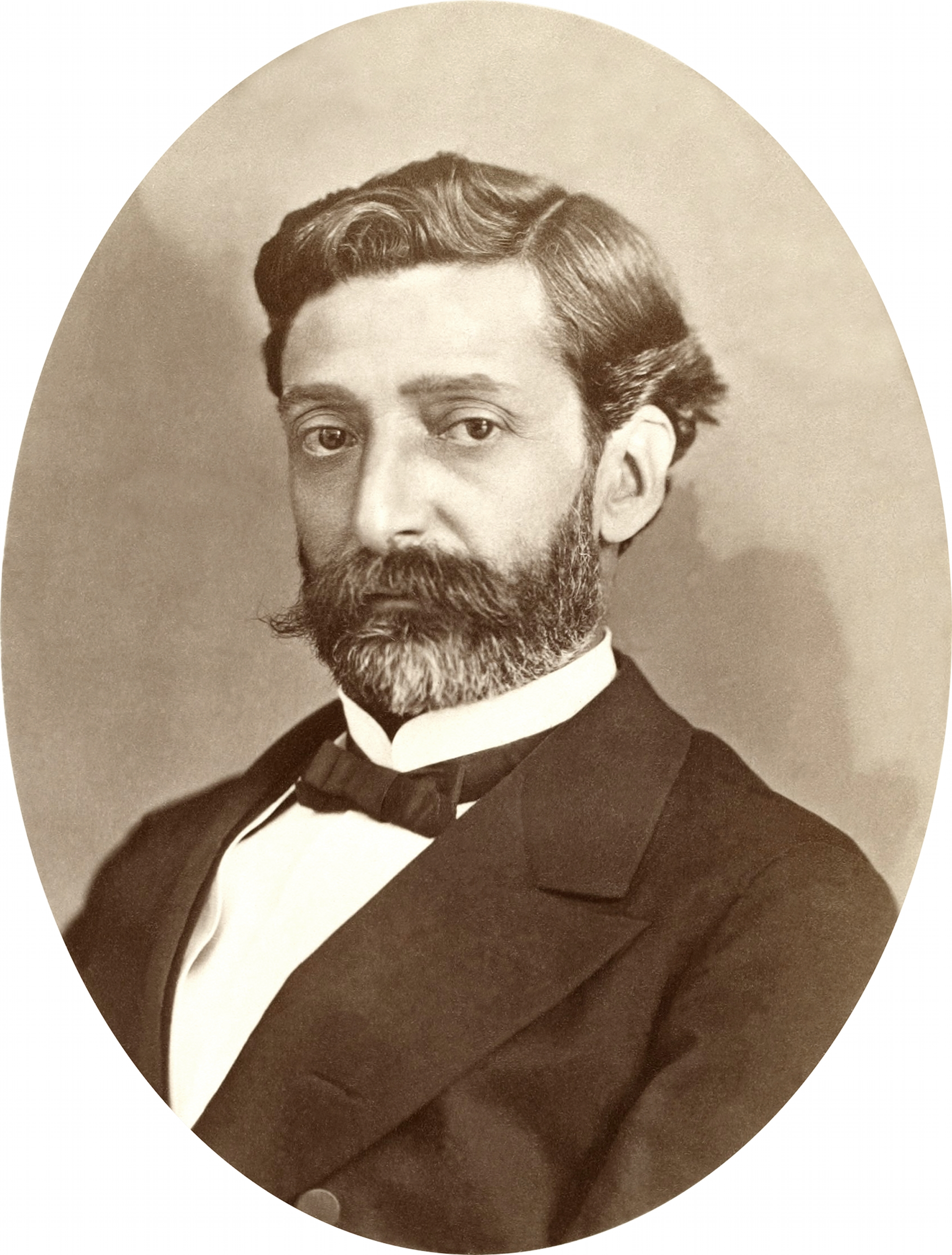
François Édouard Raynal's account of his shipwreck near the Auckland Islands was in the (July 1869, Editions 495 to 497

== Other contributors ==
- Louis Rousselet – French traveller, writer, photographer who visited India and Morocco

== See also ==
- L'Illustration
- Édouard Riou, illustrateur
