= Alexander Douglas =

Alexander or Alex Douglas may refer to:

- Alexander Douglas (bishop-designate) (fl. 1528), Scottish noble and cleric, bishop-elect of Moray
- Alexander Douglas (bishop) (died 1623), Roman Catholic Bishop of Moray, Scotland
- Sir Alexander Douglas (Orkney and Shetland) (died 1718), Member of Parliament for Orkney and Shetland, 1708–1713
- Alexander Douglas-Hamilton, Marquess of Douglas and Clydesdale (born 1978), Scottish aristocrat
- Alexander Edgar Douglas (1916–1981), Canadian physicist
- Alexander Stuart Douglas (1921–1998), physician and haematologist
- Alex Douglas (footballer, born 1893), Scottish football centre-half
- Alex Douglas (politician) (born 1958), Queensland Member of Parliament for Gaven
- A.S. Douglas (Alexander Shafto Douglas, born 1921), British professor of computer science
- Alex Douglas (footballer, born 2001), Swedish football centre-back for Lech Poznań
- Alex Douglas, a character in the 1984 American film The Ambassador

== See also ==
- Sandy Douglass (1904–1992), racer, designer, and builder of sailing dinghies
- Alec Douglas-Home (1903–1995), Prime Minister of the United Kingdom
- Alec Douglas (1939–2014), South African cricketer
- Alexander Douglas-Hamilton (disambiguation)
