= Patrick Hepburn (bishop) =

Scottish prelate

- Bishop of Moray
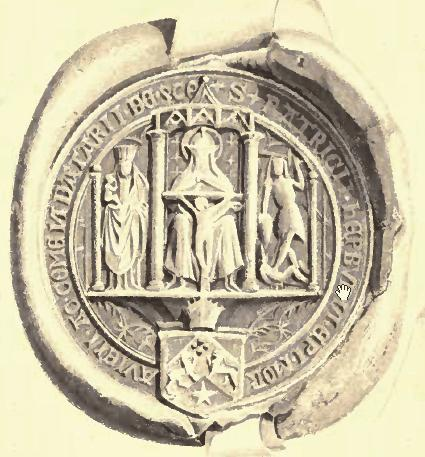
- See: Diocese of Moray
- In office: 1538–1573
- Predecessor: Alexander Stewart
- Successor: George Douglas
- Previous post: Prior of St Andrews

Orders
- Consecration: 1538

Personal details
- Born: 1487 Probably East Lothian
- Died: 20 June 1573 (aged 85–86) Spynie Castle

Patrick Hepburn (1487 – 20 June 1573) was a 16th-century Scottish prelate. He served as both pre- and post-Reformation Bishop of Moray.

He was born in East Lothian, went to St Andrews University, entered the church, and then exploited his family connections to become Prior of St Andrews and royal secretary. Hepburn moved on to become Bishop of Moray and Commendator of Scone and played an ambiguous role in the Scottish Reformation. During this time he held a notorious reputation for immorality. He was deprived of his ecclesiastical titles two years before his death in 1573.

== Early life and career ==
Born to Patrick Hepburn of Beinstoun and Christian née Ogilvie in 1487, he entered the college now known as St Mary's College, St Andrews - then called simply "The Pedagogy" - in 1509. After graduating, he chose an ecclesiastical career and became parson of Whitsome from 1521. On 10 June 1524 Patrick, as a secular clerk, was appointed by Pope Clement VII as coadjutor to his uncle John Hepburn, Prior of St Andrews. This meant he would assist his aged uncle as prior and succeed him as commendator when he died. The coadjutorship gave Patrick a seat in parliament, which he took up in 1525; he became secretary of King James V of Scotland, a position he held between March 1525 and June 1526. Patrick succeeded his uncle when the latter died on 15 January 1526.

== Bishop of Moray and Commendator of Scone ==
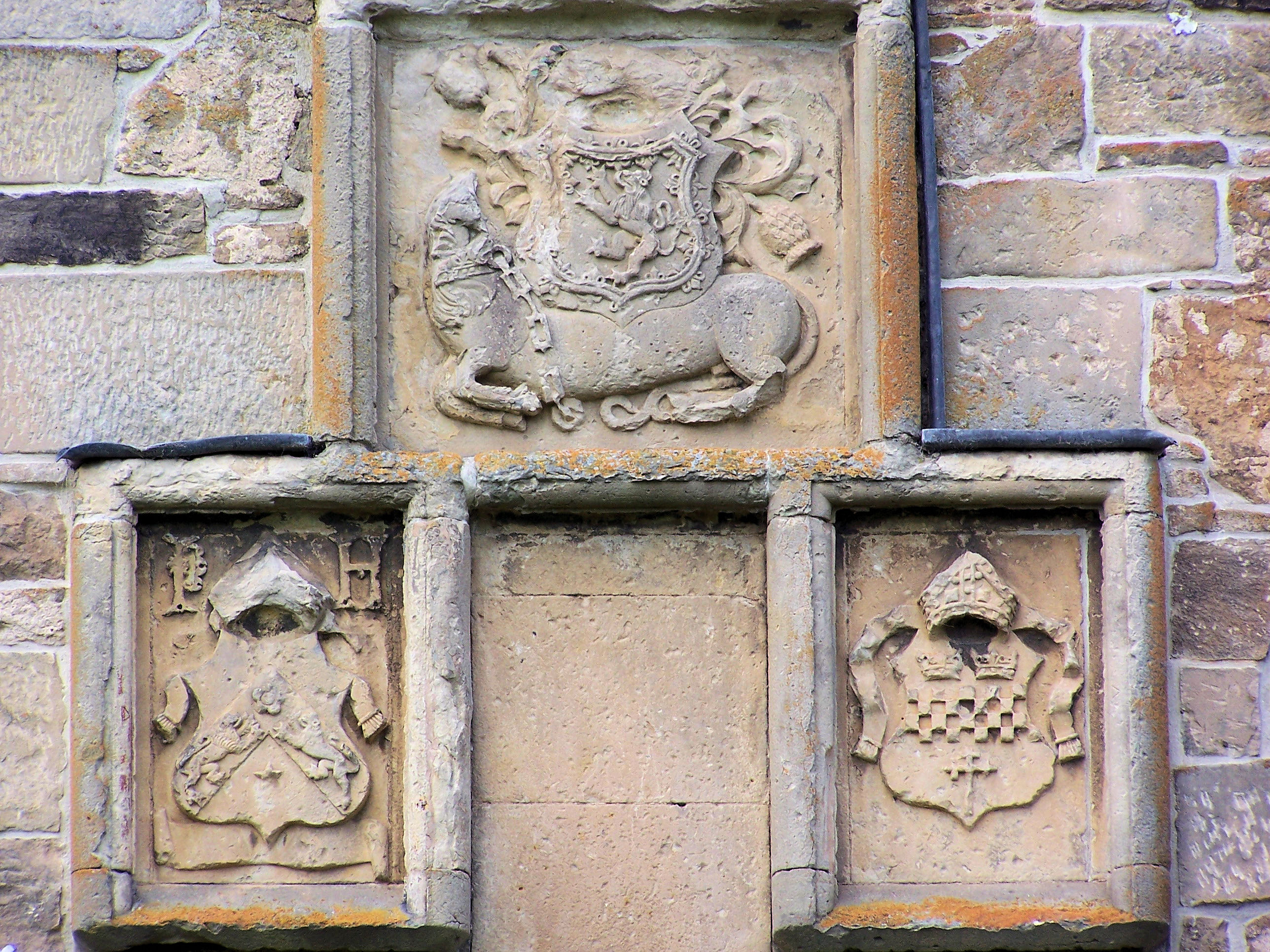
Armorials at Spynie Castle. Bishop Hepburn's armour is the one on the bottom left.

After the death of Alexander Stewart, Bishop of Moray and Commendator of Scone, Patrick was given crown nomination to succeed to both positions on 1 March 1538. He was provided by the Papacy on 14 June, on the condition he should resign the commend of St Andrews Cathedral Priory. Hepburn's episcopate is remembered as notorious for the dilapidation with which his dominions suffered. A huge percentage of his diocese was leased out, and in 1547 Scone Abbey itself went on a 19-year lease to one John Erskine of Dun. Meanwhile, Bishop Hepburn enjoyed an extravagant lifestyle. As early as 1529, when Hepburn was Commendator-Prior of St Andrews, Alexander Alesius, a canon of this Hepburn's own priory was preaching against Hepburn's ungodly lifestyle.

Nevertheless, Bishop Hepburn did play an important part in Scottish politics of the 1540s and 1550s. Though he was part of the privy council of the Governor of Scotland, James Hamilton, Earl of Arran (after 1548, Duke of Châtellerault), he nevertheless opposed Arran's wish to have the young Mary, Queen of Scots, put in English custody. In this he was supporting the staunchly anti-Protestant Cardinal David Beaton. The Bishop of Moray was in attendance at the provincial council of the Scottish church in 1549, an attempt to reform the church internally without abandoning links with Rome. He was present at the burnings of Protestant heretics/martyrs in 1550 and 1558.

== Hepburn and the Reformation ==
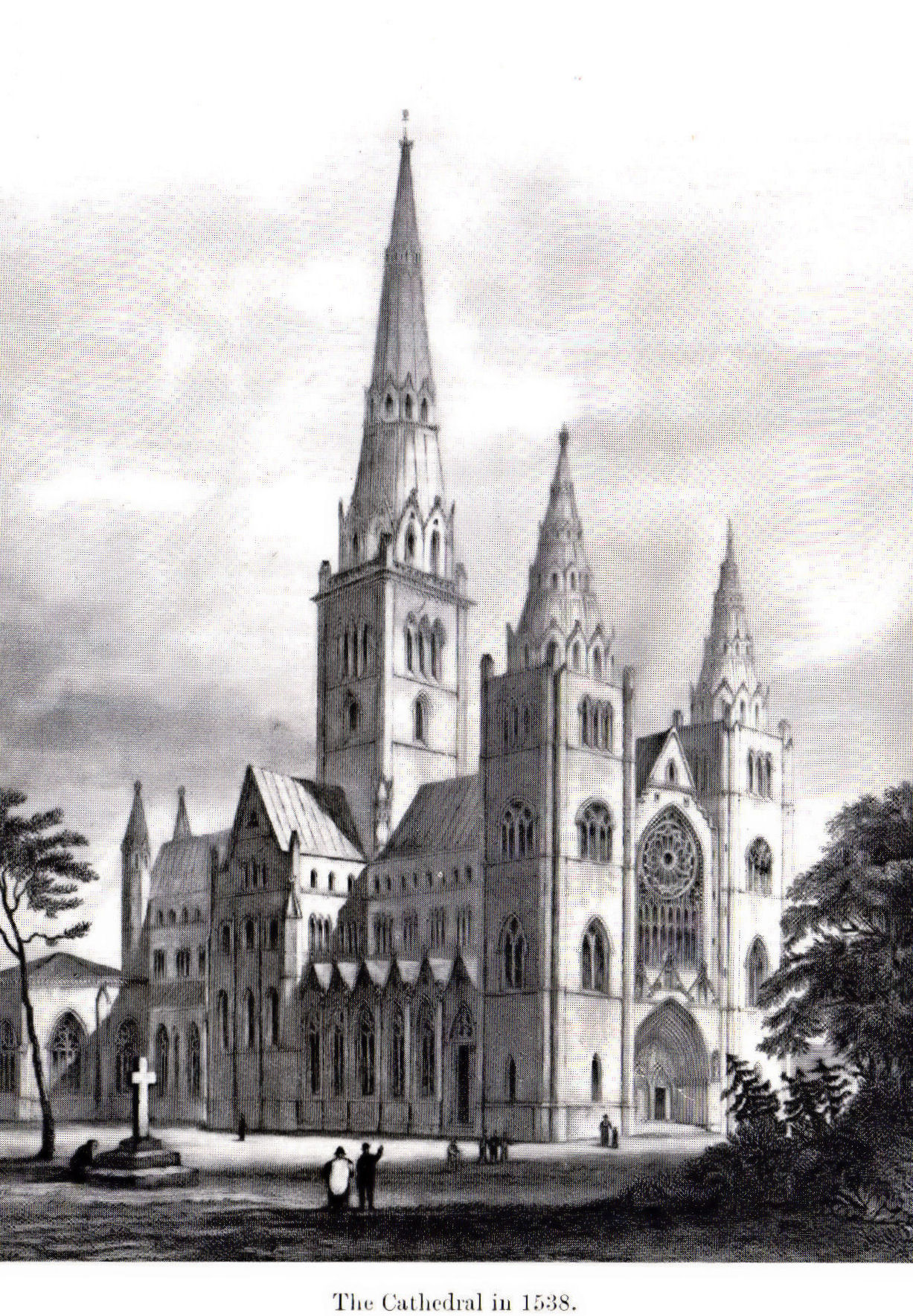
Reconstruction of Elgin Cathedral as it would have appeared in 1538 when Hepburn became bishop

In summarising the attitudes of individual Scottish bishops at the Scottish Reformation, the historian Gordon Donaldson described him as follows:

a voluptuary, [Hepburn] was successful in his main object of continuing to enjoy his revenues for his lifetime and there is no evidence that he took any interest in religious developments.

Hepburn co-operated with the reformers in the years leading up to the Reformation of 1560. In 1559, Archibald Campbell, 5th Earl of Argyll and Lord James Stewart, the senior secular figures of the Lords of the Congregation, saved Hepburn's palace-abbey from destruction by the reformers. Stewart and Argyll had only protected Hepburn's palace-abbey on the condition that the latter aided them with men and arms, and with a vote against the clergy in Parliament. Yet he did not attend the Reformation Parliament of 1560, and in 1561 he and George Gordon, 4th Earl of Huntly, advised Mary, Queen of Scots, to land at Aberdeen rather than Leith, in an effort to improve the prospects of restoring the old catholic order.

== Hepburn the womaniser ==
In his time, Hepburn was notorious for his philandering. The contemporary chronicler Robert Lindsay of Pitscottie wrote that Hepburn "ever was a master of whores all of his days and committed whoredom and adultery both with maidens and men's wives". By at least five different mistresses he produced at least thirteen illegitimate children. He had four sons and one daughter by Isabel Liddell, namely Patrick, Adam, George, John and Jane; by another mistress, Marion Strang, he had one son, whose name was William; with Janet Urquhart, he fathered another three sons and one daughter, Patrick, David, Thomas, and Joanna; with Elizabeth Innes, he sired a son named Alexander; and by a mistress whose name has not survived he had a further two daughters. Bishop Hepburn eventually had ten of his bastards legitimised, and indeed it is largely down to his efforts to achieve legitimisation that the names of many of these children have been recorded in the Register of the Great Seal.

== The end ==
Hepburn seems to have been uneasy with the Scottish Reformation. Although he agreed in principle to modify the structure of Elgin Cathedral to accommodate Protestant forms of worship, few powerful figures on the reformist side trusted him. During the Civil War of 1567, the bishop pledged his support to James Hepburn, Earl of Bothwell, and was accused of giving him shelter during his flight northwards to Scandinavia. Perhaps in an act of reprisal against the bishop's defiance, the privy council ordered the removal of the lead water-proofing from Elgin Cathedral and although the council ordered its replacement in 1569, there is no evidence that this was carried out. He was finally forfeited of his bishopric by parliament in August 1571. He held out in Spynie Palace where he died on 20 June 1573. Hepburn, the last pre-reformation bishop of Moray, was buried in the cathedral choir.

== Notes ==
Religious titles
Preceded by John Hepburn	Prior of St Andrews; 1524–1538	Succeeded by James Stewart, 1st Earl of Moray
Preceded by Alexander Stewart	Bishop of Moray; 1538–1573	Succeeded by George Douglas
Preceded by Alexander Stewart	Commendator of Scone; 1538–1571	Succeeded by William Lord Ruthven
