= Walter I, Prior of St Andrews =

Walter I
- Born: 12th century Unknown
- Died: c. 1199 unknown
- Resting place: St Andrews Cathedral
- Occupation: Augustinian Prior
- Title: Prior of St Andrews, Precentor of St Andrews

Walter I (died c. 1199) was a 12th-century Augustinian Anglo-Norman prelate active in the kingdom of Scotland.

A canon of St Andrews Cathedral Priory (in Fife), he was precentor of the cathedral when he became prior of St Andrews in 1160. Walter Bower, our principal source for Walter, says that he served as prior for 24 years before resigning on grounds of ill-health. Bower's "24 years" is probably a mistake for "34 years", as other sources attest his priorship from his accession in 1160 (the Chronicle of Melrose) to his last charter appearance in 1195.

His successor was Gilbert I. Gilbert died within a few years of taking office, in later 1198 or early 1199, and because of this Walter briefly resumed office. Walter died "within the same year" [Bower], probably sometime in 1199. Thomas, the former sub-prior, is attested as prior of St Andrews for the first time in a document dating to 6 June 1199. Walter's time as prior coincided with the episcopates of bishops Ernald, Richard, John the Scot, Hugh and Roger de Beaumont.

Catholic Church titles
Preceded by Robert I	Prior of St Andrews; 1160–1195	Succeeded by Gilbert I
Preceded by Gilbert I	Prior of St Andrews; 1198x1199	Succeeded by Thomas I
