= Alexander Stewart (bishop of Moray) =

Scottish prelate

Alexander Stewart (1477 – 19 December 1537) was a Scottish prince and prelate; also known as Alexander Stewart of Pitcairn. He was the son of Alexander Stewart, Duke of Albany, and his first wife Lady Catherine Sinclair, daughter of William Sinclair, Earl of Orkney and Earl of Caithness. The marriage of his parents was dissolved in 1478 and his father remarried, but it was not until 1516 that an act of parliament made the marriage unlawful and ensured that Alexander Jr. would be regarded as legally illegitimate and unable to inherit his father's title.

His high birth, however, enabled a successful career in the church. He held Inchaffray Abbey from 1514, and Scone Abbey from 1518 in commendam. Between 1516 and 1518 he held a right to the commend of Whithorn Priory, a right he gave up to the papally-backed Silvio Passarini. He held the Collegiate Church of Dunbar from 1504 until at least 1510, and almost certainly beyond. He was Dean of Brechin from at least 1523, and perhaps as early as 1512. He was given crown nomination to the bishopric of Moray and then papal provision on 13 September 1529, after the failure of the candidature of Alexander Douglas I. He was probably not consecrated until 1532. He was allowed to retain control of his monastic commends. He died on 19 or 21 December 1537.

== Family and children ==
About 1518, he had intention of marriage with Margaret Stewart Lady Gordon, widow of Lord Gordon but this did not occur. Margaret Stewart was the natural daughter of James IV of Scotland and his mistress Margaret Drummond. They didn't marry because of their close kinship (his father, Alexander Stewart,1st Duke of Albany was the uncle of her father, James IV) but they did have a daughter.

- Margaret Stewart

== In popular culture ==
- The Spanish Princess performed by Marc Rowley

Catholic Church titles
Preceded by Alexander Gifford	Dean of Dunbar Collegiate Church; 1499 x 1504–1510 x 1524	Succeeded by Thomas Hay
Preceded by Hugh Douglas	Dean of Brechin; 1512 x 1523–1534	Succeeded by Henry White
Preceded by Peter Accoltis	Commendator of Inchaffray; 1514–1537	Succeeded by Gavin Dunbar
Preceded by Henry MacDowell	Commendator of Whithorn; 1514–1537	Succeeded by Silvio Passarini
Preceded by James Abercrombie	Commendator of Scone; 1518–1537	Succeeded by Patrick Hepburn
Preceded by Robert Shaw	Bishop of Moray; 1529–1537	Succeeded by Patrick Hepburn
