= Robert I, Prior of St Andrews =

Robert
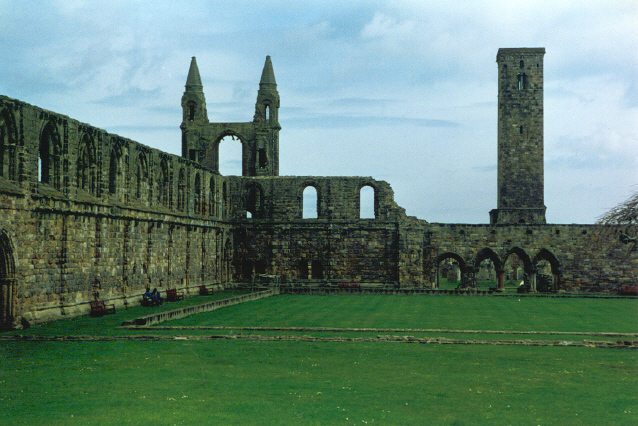
- Ruins of St Andrews Cathedral Priory
- Born: c. 1100; Unknown
- Died: 1160; St Andrews
- Occupation: Augustinian Prior
- Title: Prior of St Andrews

Robert I or Robert of Nostell (died 1160) was a 12th-century Anglo-Norman Augustinian churchman, the first prior of St Andrews.

Robert came to the Kingdom of Scotland from Nostell Priory as head of a group of Nostell canons establishing St Andrews Cathedral Priory. He had been invited by Robert, Bishop of St Andrews, himself an ex-member of Nostell.

Robert was probably established at St Andrews in 1140, but certainly by 14 May 1144. Robert had come directly from Nostell, not via Scone Abbey.

Walter Bower, writing in the 15th century, said that Robert died in 1162 and had charge of the priory for twenty-two years. According to the earlier and more reliable Melrose Chronicle, Robert actually died in 1160.

Catholic Church titles
Preceded by New creation	Prior of St Andrews; 1140x1144–1160	Succeeded by Walter
