= Alexander Douglas-Hamilton =

Alexander Douglas-Hamilton may refer to:

- Alexander Douglas-Hamilton, 10th Duke of Hamilton
- Alexander Douglas-Hamilton, 16th Duke of Hamilton

== See also ==
- Alexander Douglas (disambiguation)
- Alexander Hamilton (disambiguation)
