= John Hamilton (archbishop of St Andrews) =

Scottish prelate and politician (1512–1571)

The Most Reverend John Hamilton
- Archbishop of St Andrews; Primate of Scotland
- Church: Roman Catholic
- Archdiocese: St Andrews
- Appointed: 28 November 1547
- In office: 1547–1571
- Predecessor: David Beaton
- Successor: Gavin Hamilton
- Previous post: Bishop of Dunkeld (1544–46)

Orders
- Consecration: 22 August 1546

Personal details
- Born: 3 February 1512
- Died: 6 April 1571 (aged 59) Stirling, Scotland
- Parents: James Hamilton, 1st Earl of Arran & Mrs Boyd
- Partner: Grizzel Sempill
- Children: 6

John Hamilton (3 February 1512 – 6 April 1571), Scottish prelate and politician, was an illegitimate son of The 1st Earl of Arran (in the Peerage of Scotland).

== Brother of the Regent ==
At a very early age Hamilton became a monk and Abbot of Paisley. After studying in Paris he returned to Scotland, where he soon rose to a position of power and influence under his half-brother, The 2nd Earl of Arran, who was serving as Regent. He was made Keeper of the Privy Seal of Scotland in 1543 and bishop of Dunkeld two years later; in 1546 he followed Cardinal David Beaton as Archbishop of St Andrews, and about the same time he became treasurer of the kingdom.

In 1553 the Italian physician Gerolamo Cardano cured him of a disease that had left him speechless and was thought incurable. The diplomat Thomas Randolph recorded the "merry tales" rumoured about his methods still current in Edinburgh nine years later. Cardano himself wrote that the Archbishop had been short of breath for ten years, and after the cure was effected by his assistant, he was paid 1,400 gold crowns. While the Archbishop was unwell, his brother was persuaded to give up the Regency of Scotland to Mary of Guise.

He made vigorous efforts to stay the growth of Protestantism, but with one or two exceptions persecution was not the policy of Archbishop Hamilton, and in the interests of the Roman Catholic faith, a catechism called Hamilton's Catechism (published with an introduction by TG Law in 1884) was drawn up and printed, possibly at his instigation.. He is considered a co-founder of St Mary's College, St Andrews due to work on extension and completion of the latter he sponsored in the late 1550's.

Having incurred the displeasure of the Protestants, now the dominant party in Scotland, the Archbishop was imprisoned in 1563. After his release he was an active partisan of Mary, Queen of Scots; he baptised her son, the future King James VI, and pronounced the divorce of the queen from Bothwell. He was present at the Battle of Langside.

== Assassination of Regent Moray ==
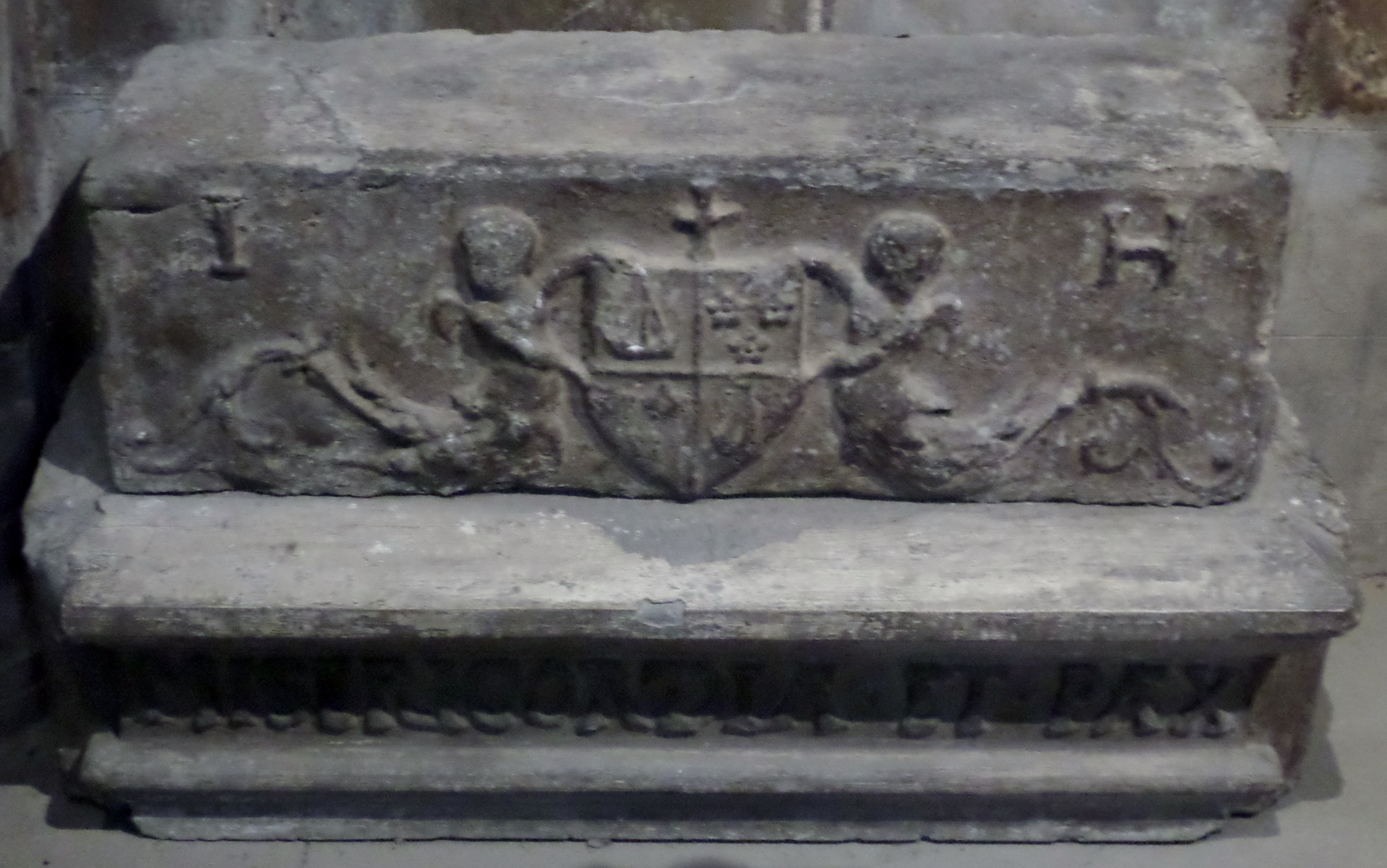
Grave of Archbishop John Hamilton

John Hamilton, with his brother James, acquired a house on the south side of Linlithgow High Street in 1550. In 1570 from this house, his nephew or close kinsman, James Hamilton of Bothwellhaugh, assassinated James Stewart, 1st Earl of Moray, the Regent of Scotland. During the aftermath, John Hamilton later took refuge in Dumbarton Castle.

The castle fell to a surprise night attack, led by Thomas Crawford of Jordanhill, and Archbishop Hamilton was captured. Concerned lest the English should seek to have the Archbishop spared, the leaders of the King's party had Hamilton speedily tried and convicted of art and part in the murder of the Regent Moray and Henry Stuart, Lord Darnley. At 6 pm on 6 April 1571, three days after his capture, he was hanged beside the Mercat Cross of Stirling.

== Children ==
Archbishop Hamilton had six children by his mistress, Grizzel Sempill, the daughter of Robert Sempill, 3rd Lord Sempill. Two of his children were legitimated on 22 January 1547 and 24 September 1548 respectively.

== Arms ==
Coat of arms of John Hamilton
Notes Hamilton's arms have been part adapted into those of St Mary's College, St Andrews Escutcheon First and fourth gules, three cinquefoils pierced ermine; second and third argent, a ship without sails sable.

== Notes and references ==
- Bain, Joseph, ed. (1898), Calendar of the State Papers Relating to Scotland and Mary, Queen of Scots 1547–1603, vol. 1, Edinburgh: H M General Register House
- Rainer Haas, Allerlei Protestanten – Christus-Zeugen aus der Tudor-Zeit, darin: 5. John Hamilton – war der spätere Erzbischof von St.Andrews 1527 als Student in Marburg an der Lahn?, Nordhausen, 2010
- Herbermann, Charles, ed. (1910). "John Hamilton" . Catholic Encyclopedia. Vol. 7. New York: Robert Appleton Company.
- Stephen, Leslie; Lee, Sidney, eds. (1890). "Hamilton, John (1511?-1571)" . Dictionary of National Biography. Vol. 24. London: Smith, Elder & Co.

Political offices
Preceded by David Beaton	Keeper of the Privy Seal of Scotland; 1542–1547	Succeeded by Lord Ruthven
Religious titles
Preceded by Robert Shaw	Commendator-Abbot of Paisley; 1525–1553	Succeeded by Claud Hamilton
Preceded by George Crichton	Bishop of Dunkeld; 1544/1546–1547	Succeeded by Robert Crichton
Preceded by David Beaton	Archbishop of St Andrews; 1547/1549–1571	Succeeded by Gavin Hamilton
Academic offices
Preceded by David Beaton	Chancellor of the University of St Andrews; 1547–1571	Succeeded by John Douglas
