= Thomas I, Prior of St Andrews =

Thomas (died sometime after 1211) was an Augustinian canon and Cistercian monk in 13th-century Scotland. According to Walter Bower Thomas was sub-prior of St Andrews Cathedral Priory when he became prior of St Andrews, sometime in 1199. He appears as prior in contemporary documents for the first time on 6 June 1199.

According to Bower, he was more pious than most of the brother canons and, being alienated and dissatisfied with their lax lifestyles, resigned his office to become a Cistercian novice at Coupar Angus Abbey. This probably happened in 1211. His successor was Prior Simon.

Catholic Church titles
Preceded by Walter I	Prior of St Andrews; 1199–1211	Succeeded by Simon
