= Simon, Prior of St Andrews =

Simon
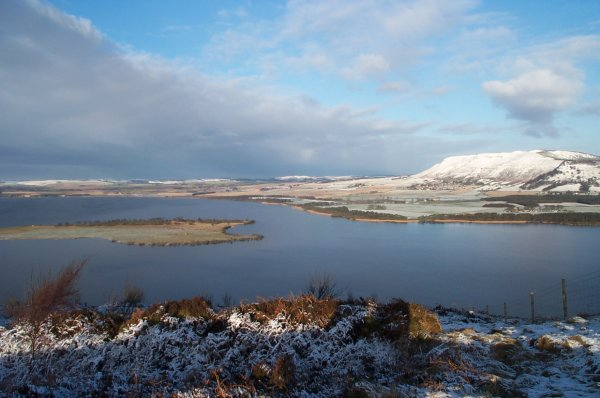
- St Serf's Inch in Loch Leven, today
- Born: 12th century Unknown
- Died: 1225x1235 unknown
- Resting place: Unknown, but probably St Serf's Inch
- Occupation: Augustinian prior
- Title: Prior of St Andrews, Prior of Loch Leven

Simon (died 1225 x 1235) was a 13th-century Augustinian canon based in the Kingdom of Scotland.

As a canon of St Andrews Cathedral Priory, he was elected prior of St Andrews in either 1211 or 1212. Simon, like his predecessor Thomas, was said by Inchcolm historian Walter Bower to have fallen out with the brothers of St Andrews and consequently to have resigned his post as prior. Subsequently, Simon became Prior of Loch Leven. This probably happened c. 1225.

St Serf's Inch Priory lay on St Serf's Inch, an island in Loch Leven in Fothriff, and was subordinate to St Andrews Cathedral Priory.

It is unclear how long Simon lived afterward, but his successor appears in the sources for the first time in 1235, indicating that Simon probably died before this year. Bower described Simon as "a man of honourable life and praiseworthy behaviour".

Catholic Church titles
Preceded by Thomas I	Prior of St Andrews c. 1212–1225	Succeeded by Henry de Norham
Preceded by Roger	Prior of Loch Leven; 1225–x1235	Succeeded by G[...]
