= Robert of Scone =

Bishop of St Andrews

- Bishop of Cell Rígmonaid (St Andrews)
- Church: Scottish Church (Augustinian Order)
- Diocese: Diocese of St Andrews
- Predecessor: Thurgot
- Successor: Arnold
- Previous post: First Prior of Scone

Orders
- Consecration: 1127 by Thurstan, Archbishop of York

Personal details
- Died: 1159
- Denomination: Catholicism (Augustinian Order)
- Occupation: Bishop, Prior

Robert of Scone (died 1159) was a 12th-century bishop of Cell Rígmonaid (or Kilrymont, now St Andrews). Robert's exact origins are unclear. He was an Augustinian canon at the Priory of St. Oswalds, at Nostell. His French name indicates a Norman rather than an Anglo-Saxon origin, but as he was likely born in the later 11th century, this may be due merely to the acculturation of his parents.

== Prior of Scone ==
Robert was one of the most important clerics in the reign of King Alexander I of Scotland (Alaxandair mac Maíl Coluim). He was appointed as the first Prior of Scone, the flagship Augustinian monastic establishment of Alexander's reign. This may have happened as early as 1114, and Walter Bower tells us that the new priory was dedicated by Thurgot, then bishop of Cell Rígmonaid. As Turgot left Scotland in 1115, no later date would be possible if Bower is to be believed. Many historians have rejected this date, because the Augustinian Rule was not instituted at Nostell until 1119, but as Kenneth Veitch points out, the date of the formal institution of the Rule is little guide to the actual activities of the monastic establishment. Moreover, the year 1114 just happened to be the year in which Alexander was present in England in the service of his overlord, King Henry I of England.

== Bishop of St Andrews ==
It was this context that made Robert a natural candidate for the chief Scottish bishopric. He was probably elected to the bishopric in 1124. The Chronicle of Melrose tells us that "in the same year, four months before his death, he [Alexander] had caused Robert, prior of Scone, to be elected bishop of St Andrews, but his ordination (i.e. consecration) was delayed for some time". The delay was certainly caused by the issue of submission to the archbishops of York, which the archbishops pressed for, but the kings of Alba refused to allow. Robert however was able to attain consecration at the hands of Thurstan, Archbishop of York in 1127, with no profession of obedience being made; it is possible the consecration took place after a meeting organized in the summer of 1127 at the church of St John at Roxburgh, where it was probably agreed that the lack of submission would not constitute a precedent.

== Robert and monastic patronage ==
Robert's three decade episcopate would prove to be one of the most important in the history of the bishopric. Robert was not perhaps as successful as he might have been in promoting the Augustinian Order in Scotland, but he nevertheless managed to bring Augustinians to St Andrews to found a Cathedral Priory in 1144. It is relatively clear that he did this with the co-operation of Athelwold, the first prior of St. Oswald's, and Bishop of Carlisle, a fellow Nostell monk who was head of Robert's religious community in the days before the latter moved to Scotland. Robert also established two great Augustinian abbeys, Holyrood Abbey and the Arrouaisian abbey of St Mary at Stirling (Cambuskenneth).

Robert's role was not simply that of a promoter of the Augustinian Order. His post was that of Summi (Archi)Episcopi Scotorum, called in the contemporary Scottish vernacular "Ardepscop Alban", that is, "High Bishop of Scotland". He was hence the structural leader of the Scottish church. Along with Bishop John of Glasgow, Robert became the chief reforming cleric in the reforming reign of King David I of Scotland. He is one of the most frequent witnesses to the charters of King David. Unlike most other incumbents Scottish bishoprics, most of them very new, Robert was a foreigner drawn from the non-Gaelic world, in the words of Oram, "part of 'colonial' establishment which was emerging in the early twelfth century". In this context, the difference between "reform" and religious and cultural "colonialism" is merely one of perspective. However, Robert's episcopate in no way led to the destruction of the native clerical order at Cell Rígmonaid. In fact, many of the native Gaelic clergy were absorbed into the incoming orders, and those who were not, continued to receive the patronage of the bishop. In one case, the clergy of the Céli Dé abbey of St. Serfs at Loch Leven were given a large collection of books by the bishop.

== Quest for archiepisicopal status ==
By 1151, King David had decided to request a pallium for the bishopric, elevating the see to archiepiscopal status and creating an archdiocese embracing all Scottish sees, including the bishoprics of Orkney and the Isles. This would have made Robert the first Scottish archbishop to have his status recognized by Rome. The request was prompted by the arrival in Scotland of the Papal Legate John Paparo, on his way to Ireland to create four new archbishoprics there. When the legate arrived back madein Scotland in 1152, David submitted a request. However, the proposal appears never to have been made to the Pope by the Cardinal, and the ambitions of Bishop Robert and King David were further subverted in the same year when the Papacy created the Archbishopric of Trondheim (Niðaros), embracing both Orkney and the Isles.

By the later 1150s, bishop Robert is described as "oppressed by age and infirmity" in a bull of Pope Adrian IV. He may have died in 1158, but more probably died the following year.

== See also ==
- Robert I, Prior of St Andrews, canon of Nostell and first Prior of St Andrews

== Notes ==
=== References ===
- Anderson, Marjorie Ogilvie (1994). "St. Andrews before Alexander I". In G. W. S. Barrow (ed.). The Scottish Tradition. Edinburgh. pp. 1–13.
- Barrow, G. W. S. (1992). "The lost Gàidhealtachd". Scotland and Its Neighbours in the Middle Ages. London: A&C Black. pp. 105–126. ISBN 9781852850524.
- Barrow, G. W. S. (2003a). "The Royal House and the religious orders". In G. W. S. Barrow (ed.). The Kingdom of the Scots (2nd ed.). Edinburgh: Edinburgh University Press. pp. 151–168. ISBN 978-0-7486-1803-3.
- Barrow, G. W. S. (2003b). "The clergy of St Andrews". In G. W. S. Barrow (ed.). The Kingdom of the Scots (2nd ed.). Edinburgh: Edinburgh University Press. pp. 187–202. ISBN 978-0-7486-1803-3.
- Bartlett, Robert (1993). The Making of Europe, Conquest, Colonization and Cultural Change: 950–1350. London: Penguin. ISBN 978-0-14-192704-6.
- Broun, Dauvit (2000). "Recovering the full text of version A of the foundation legend". In Simon Taylor (ed.). Kings, Clerics and Chronicles in Scotland, 500–1297. Dublin. pp. 108–114.
- Dowden, John (1912). J. Maitland Thomson (ed.). The Bishops of Scotland: Being Notes on the Lives of All the Bishops, Under Each of the Sees, Prior to the Reformation. Glasgow: John MacLehose and Sons.
- Oram, Richard (2004). David I: The King Who Made Scotland. Stroud: Tempus. ISBN 978-0-7524-2825-3.
- Veitch, Kenneth (2001). "'Replanting Paradise': Alexander I and the reform of religious life in Scotland". Innes Review. 52 (2): 136–166. doi:10.3366/inr.2001.52.2.136.

Religious titles
Preceded by -	Prior of Scone; 1114 x 1122-1127	Succeeded by Nicholas
Preceded by Turgot (consecrated)/ Eadmer (unconsecrated)	Bishop of Cell Rígmonaid (St Andrews) bp. 1124/7-1159	Succeeded by Ernald
