= Abbot of Paisley =

The Abbot of Paisley (later Commendator of Paisley; Prior of Paisley before 1219) was the head of the Cluniac monastic community of Paisley Abbey and its property. The monastery was founded as a priory at Renfrew in 1163, but moved to Paisley in 1169. It became an abbey in 1219. The founder was Walter fitz Alan, Seneschal (Steward) of Scotland. The line of abbots ended when it was turned into a secular lordship for Lord Claud Hamilton in 1587/1592. The following is a list of abbots and commendators:

== List of priors ==
- ???, 1163 x 1165
- Osbert, 1173-1180x1192
- Roger, 1195 x 1196 -1208 x 1214

== List of abbots ==
- ???, 1220
- William, 1225/6 -1238, 1248?
- Stephen, 1272–1285
- Walter, 1296
- A[ ? ], 1301
- Roger, 1318–1325
- John, 1327
- James, 1349
- John, 1362–1370
- John de Lithgow I, 1384-1408 x 1412
- Alan de Govan, 1412
- John de Lychcar, 1412
- William de Cheshelme, 1414
- Roland, 1414-1415
- John de Lithgow II (?Lychcar), 1415-1431 x 1432
- Thomas Morrow, 1418–1444
- Richard Bothwell, 1444–1445
- Thomas de Tarveis, 1445–1459
- Henry Crichton, 1459–1471
- Patrick Graham, 1466–1471
- George Shaw, 1471–1499
- Robert Shaw, 1498–1525

== List of commendators ==
- John Hamilton, 1525-1553
- Claude Hamilton, 1553–1587
- Robert Lord Sempill, 1569–1573
- William Erskine, 1581-1584
- Claude Hamilton, 1586-1592 as 1st Lord Paisley

== See also ==
- Paisley Abbey

== Bibliography ==
- Cowan, Ian B. & Easson, David E., Medieval Religious Houses: Scotland With an Appendix on the Houses in the Isle of Man, Second Edition, (London, 1976), pp. 64–5
- Watt, D.E.R. & Shead, N.F. (eds.), The Heads of Religious Houses in Scotland from the 12th to the 16th Centuries, The Scottish Records Society, New Series, Volume 24, (Edinburgh, 2001), pp. 167–73
