= Gavin Hamilton (archbishop of St Andrews) =

Scottish prelate

- Archbishop of St Andrews
- Archdiocese: St Andrews
- In office: 1571–1571
- Predecessor: John Hamilton
- Successor: John Douglas
- Previous posts: Coadjutor Archbishop of St Andrews (1555–71); Abbot of Kilwinning (1550–71)

Personal details
- Died: 1571

Gavin Hamilton (died 1571) was an early modern Scottish prelate, coadjutor of the Archdiocese of St. Andrews, and Archbishop of St. Andrews.

Gavin was the son of James Hamilton of Raploch. He had been Abbot of Kilwinning. In 1555, he was appointed as the coadjutor, i.e. successor, of Archbishop John Hamilton of St Andrews. Archbishop John Hamilton died on 7 April 1571; Gavin's name is mentioned in the record of a parliament held at Edinburgh on 13 June, as "Gawan Hamilton, archbishop of St. Andrews". Although there is no record of his formal appointment, the parliament notice appears to tell us that Gavin indeed ruled as bishop for a few months. Gavin died in a skirmish a few days after this parliament.

Religious titles
Preceded by John Hamilton	Archbishop of St. Andrews; 1571	Succeeded by John Douglas
