= Robert Shaw (bishop) =

Scottish cluniac monk and prelate

Robert Shaw (died 1527) was a Scottish Cluniac monk and prelate. A son of the Laird of Sauchie, he became a monk at Paisley Abbey. He was provided as Abbot of Paisley after the resignation of Abbot George Shaw on 20 July 1498. As abbot, he took an active if unimportant role in national affairs, appearing many times as a witness to royal charters. On 11 January 1525, he was given crown nomination to Pope Clement VII to succeed James Hepburn as Bishop of Moray. The nomination was agreeable with the papacy and on 17 May he was provided to the see. He held the diocese of Moray for only two years, serving once on a diplomatic mission to England. He died sometime before November 1527.

Religious titles
Preceded by George Shaw	Abbot of Paisley; 1498–1525	Succeeded by John Hamilton
Preceded by James Hepburn	Bishop of Moray; 1525–1527	Succeeded by Alexander Douglas (uncons.); Alexander Stewart
