= John Hepburn (prior) =

16th-century Scottish cleric

John Hepburn (died after 20 July 1525) was a Scottish cleric. The son of Patrick Hepburn, 1st Lord of Hailes, he was Prior of Saint Andrews. He established St. Leonard's College at the University of St. Andrews in 1512. In around 1520 he funded the reconstruction of the town walls of St. Andrews.

He also briefly held the ward of Patrick Hepburn, 3rd Earl of Bothwell his great nephew. His other relation Patrick Hepburn (not to be confused with the Earl) succeeded him in the priory in 1525. [John Dowden, Bishops of Scotland, Glasgow, 1912] This Patrick Hepburn also gained the young Earl's ward his relative John's death. [Scots Peerage]

He was elected as Archbishop of St. Andrews but his appointment was turned down by the Pope.

== Arms ==
Coat of arms of John Hepburn
Notes Hepburn being a cleric traditionally had a pastoral staff placed paleways behind the shield. Escutcheon Gules, on a chevron argent a rose between two lions combatant of the first.

Catholic Church titles
Preceded by Walter Monypenny	Prior of St Andrews; 1483–1526	Succeeded by Patrick Hepburn
Preceded by Alexander Stewart	Archbishop of St Andrews el. 1513	Succeeded by Innocenzo Cibo
