= Gilbert I, Prior of St Andrews =

Scottish Canon

Gilbert I
- Born: 12th century
- Died: c. 1198; Clackmannan
- Occupation: Augustinian prior
- Title: Prior of St Andrews

Gilbert (died c. 1198) was a 12th-century Augustinian canon. Active in Scotland, he may have been of Anglo-Norman origin.

Gilbert was a canon of St Andrews Cathedral Priory when he became prior of St Andrews in either 1196 or 1197, succeeding Prior Walter who had resigned because of ill-health. Walter Bower, in his list of St Andrews priors in the Scotichronicon, says that Gilbert held office for two years of "busy activity" before falling ill at the priory's manor in Clackmannan, dying there soon after.

His death probably fell in either late 1198 or early 1199. Afterwards Prior Walter resumed his old office (though he himself died within the year). Walter's time as prior coincided with the episcopate of Roger de Beaumont.

Catholic Church titles
Preceded by Walter I	Prior of St Andrews; 1196x1197–1198x1199	Succeeded by Walter I
