= James Haldenston =

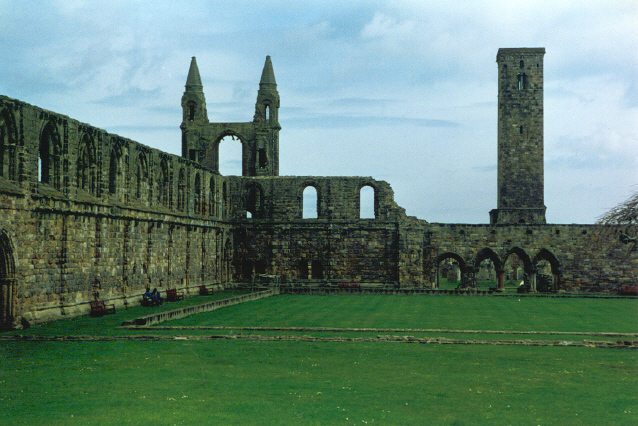
- Ruins of St Andrews Cathedral Priory
- Born: Late 14th century (likely); Eastern Fife (likely)
- Died: 18 July 1443; St Andrews
- Occupation: Augustinian Prior
- Title: Prior of St Andrews (and, earlier, Prior of May); Also Dean of Theology, St Andrews

James Haldenston or James Haldenstoun (died 18 July 1443) was an Augustinian churchman from 15th-century Scotland. Probably from somewhere in eastern Fife, Haldenston became an Augustinian at St Andrews, earned several degrees on the continent, and became prior of May before becoming prior of St Andrews, head of the wealthiest and most important religious house in Scotland.

== Background ==
Haldenston's origin is unclear. His surname is spelled variously as "Halenston", "Haldenson", "Hawdenston", "Haddistoun", "Haldestoun" and "Aldeston", and it is attested in eastern Fife in the 1380s and 1390s. He had a brother called Andrew, who witnessed two of his charters in the 1430s, and a kinsman by the name of Robert de Kinmounth (or Kininmund, as in Alexander de Kinimund, Bishop of Aberdeen 1355–1380).

James was a Bachelor of theology by 17 September 1412, and a Master in Theology by 21 June 1414. By 1417 he had a doctorate in theology. He was probably a graduate of the University of Paris, It is likely that he had become a canon of St Andrews Cathedral Priory before going to France for his studies. He certainly was a St Andrews canon as early as 1407, when he had some right to the position of prior of May. Haldenston was probably a client of Henry Wardlaw, Bishop of St Andrews (1403–1440), who supported his candidature for May and for his later offices.

He had intermittent possession of the office of prior of May for over a decade, litigating for the right with his rival William Nory. He had some right by September 1407, but Nory was the expected successor of Robert de Leuchars, and it is unclear to what extent Haldenston ever enjoyed possession of the office or its fruits. The battle involved trips to the papal court and an armed attack on the priory's manor at Pittenweem by Nory's followers. The priory of May had been located formerly on an island in the Firth of Forth, but by this time was at Pittenweem on the nearby Fife coast.

== Prior of St Andrews ==
Haldenston became prior of St Andrews late in 1417, being elected following the death of the previous prior William de Camera. William de Camera himself had been elected only in 1416, and had gone to the papal court to have his position confirmed. Prior William however found Haldenston and John Bullock already there claiming the position. Pope Benedict XIII commissioned the bishops of Glasgow and St Andrews to investigate the matter, but Prior William died on his way back to Scotland, at Bruges in Flanders. Haldenston was elected prior later in the year [1417]. The claim to the position by John Bullock was probably given up by the latter when he became bishop of Ross.

He was one of an embassy from James I to the Roman court in 1425. He did much to beautify the monastery and the cathedral church of St Andrews, and improve the services, and was zealous against heretics. Pope Martin V granted him the right of wearing the mitre, ring, pastoral staff, and other pontifical insignia in parliament.

During his time as head of the cathedral priory, Haldenson was dean of theology in the new University of St Andrews, and became closely involved in its affairs. The prior witnessed James I's confirmation of the university's privileges at Perth in March 1432. His close involvement with the university generated conflict with the university rector regarding power and jurisdiction, and an agreement between the prior and rector had to be drawn up. He was later remembered [in the 16th century] as one of the university's founders, but this tradition is inaccurate.

The dean installed graduands at the university, and was praised by historian Walter Bower for his skill as a teacher, as a papal tax-collector and as an inquisitor of Lollards and other heretics. Certain statutes of the Faculty of Theology indicate that the dean was rather "autocratic" [Watt], and a letter of his survives banning lecturing to one John Shaw owing to the latter's suspected heretical leanings. Haldenston's deanship coincided with the presence of the famous theologian Laurence of Lindores.

He died at St Andrews on 18 July 1443, and was interred in the north wall of the lady chapel of the cathedral. He is said to have written a treatise, Contra Lolardos, another entitled Processus contra Hæreticos, and a third, De Privilegiis Claustri sui, but none of these seem now extant. A letter-book of his, a Copiale, survives, illuminating James' period of office. Walter Bower, abbot of Inchcolm and source of much information about the priors of St Andrews, described him as "a man of great eloquence, and a person of pleasing appearance, quite elegant and becoming in his dress and bearing". Bower recorded his epitaph, and added a physical description, noting his white hair and medium size.

Catholic Church titles
Preceded by Robert de Leuchars	Prior of May; Against William Nory x1407–1418	Succeeded by Thomas de Camera
Preceded by William de Camera	Prior of St Andrews; 1417–1443	Succeeded by William Bonar
