= George Douglas (bishop) =

Scottish nobleman and prelate

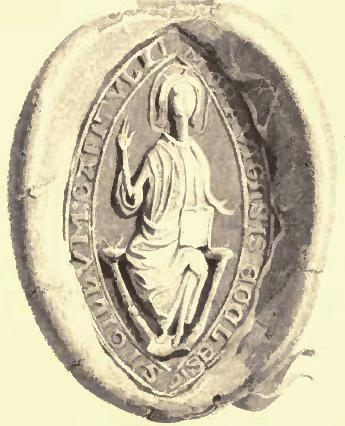
Bishop George Douglas' seal.

George Douglas (died 28 December 1589) was a late medieval Scottish nobleman and prelate. He served as Bishop of Moray.

== Life ==
The illegitimate son of Archibald Douglas, 6th Earl of Angus, he was formally recognised as his natural son under the Great Seal of 14 March 1542/3.

After the assassination of Cardinal Beaton in 1546, Douglas was appointed the main minister of Arbroath Abbey. In 1566 he is said to have been involved in the murder of David Rizzio at Holyrood House. In 1572 he is listed as "Commendator of Arbroath".

He was elected by the chapter of the diocese of Moray by 22 December 1573 several months after the death of Patrick Hepburn, the previous Bishop of Moray. He was consecrated on 5 February 1574. On 6 March 1574, the General Assembly of the Church of Scotland censured him for "immorality" with Agnes Scott, widow of Thomas Dishington of Ardross. He was very much an absentee prelate residing mainly in Edinburgh and participated in the troubled activities during James VI's minority. He held the bishopric for 16 years, until his death on 28 December 1589. He was buried in the interior of Holyrood Abbey (now ruinous). He had an illegitimate son, Andrew, who was a student at Stirling and predeceased him.

Religious titles
Preceded by Patrick Hepburn	Bishop of Moray; 1579–1589	Succeeded by Alexander Douglas II
