= James Hepburn (bishop) =

Scottish prelate and administrator

Andrew Stewart
- Bishop of Moray
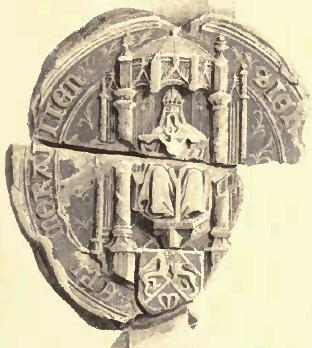
- Coat of arms of James Hepburn
- Church: Roman Catholic Church
- See: Diocese of Moray
- In office: 1516–1524
- Predecessor: Andrew Forman
- Successor: Robert Shaw

Orders
- Consecration: 1516

Personal details
- Born: Probably late 15th century Probably Whitsome, Berwickshire
- Died: Early November 1524; Moray

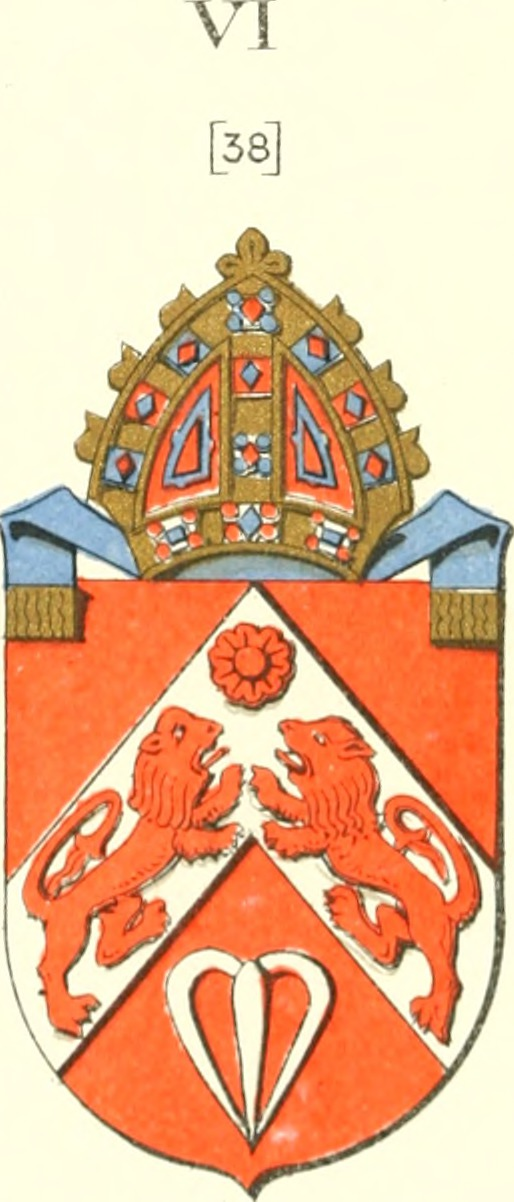
Coat arms of James Hepburn.

James Hepburn (died 1524) was a Scottish prelate and administrator. He was the son of Alexander Hepburn of Whitsome. His name occurs as the rector of Dalry and king's clerk on 1 August 1511. Hepburn was Treasurer of Scotland between from at least June 1515, until October the following year. He also held the position of rector of Parton in the diocese of Galloway.

He was elected Bishop of Moray sometime before 12 February 1516, on the nomination of the Governor of Scotland, John Stewart, Duke of Albany, following the translation of Bishop Andrew Forman to the Archbishopric of St Andrews.

Hepburn had been granted the temporalities of the see by 28 August. With his provision by Pope Leo X on 14 May 1516, he received a Bull exempting him from the metropolitan and legatine jurisdiction of the Archbishop of St Andrews. Although Archbishop Forman (d. 1521) had consented to this, his successor James Beaton resented it, and wrote to a senior Cardinal as a part of a wider attempt to have this reversed.

Among other activities as during his short episcopate, Hepburn instituted the church of Duffus as a new rectory. He died shortly before 11 November 1524.

== Notes ==
Religious titles
Preceded by Andrew Forman	Bishop of Moray; 1516–1524	Succeeded by Robert Shaw
