= Alexander Douglas (bishop-designate) =

Alexander Douglas (fl. 1528) was a Scottish aristocrat and priest in the Pre-Reformation church. He was the son of Sir Archibald Douglas of Kilspindie, Treasurer of Scotland. After the death of Robert Shaw, Bishop of Moray, Alexander was given crown nomination to the Apostolic see as Shaw's successor. At that time, during the minority of King James V of Scotland, Alexander's kinsman Archibald Douglas, 6th Earl of Angus, was in control of the country. However, this appointment was opposed by John Stewart, Duke of Albany, Angus' rival, who was supporting his own brother, Alexander Stewart. The fall of Angus in late 1528 appears to have doomed his candidature. He largely disappears from the records, and it is Stewart who succeeds to the bishopric. However, he does appear on some of the lists of bishops as Alexander Douglas I to distinguish him from another member of his extended family, Alexander Douglas II.
