= Abbot of Scone =

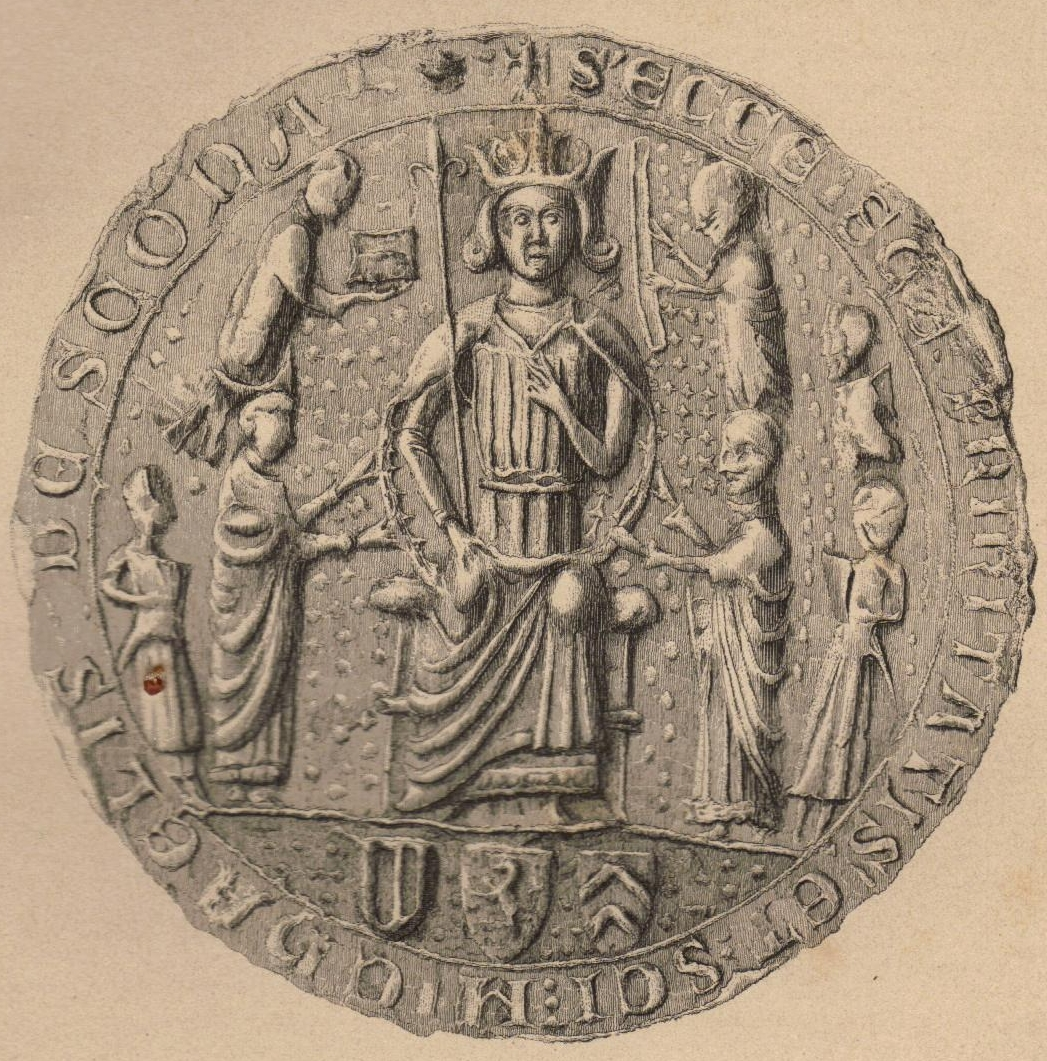
Seal of Scone Abbey.

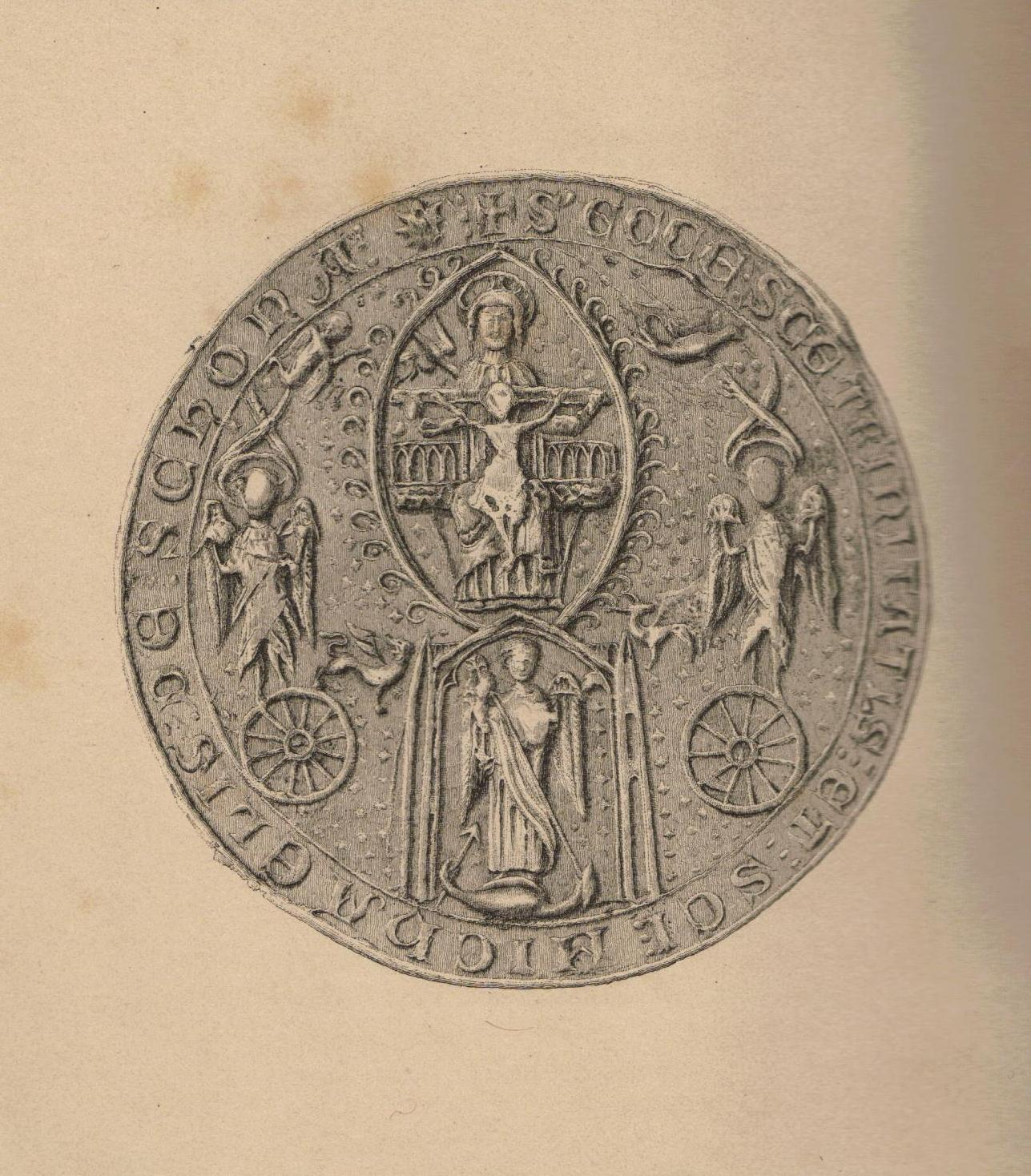
Another seal of Scone Abbey.

The Abbot of Scone, before 1163 x 4, Prior of Scone, and then by the beginning of the 16th century, the Commendator of Scone, was the head of the community of Augustinian canons of Scone Abbey and their lands. The priory was established by King Alaxandair mac Maíl Choluim (Alexander I) sometime between 1114 and 1120, and was elevated to the status of an abbey in 1163 or 1164. The abbey was turned into a secular lordship for William Ruthven, 1st Earl of Gowrie in 1581, but was forfeited when the earl was executed in 1584, given to William Foularton in the same year, but restored to the earl's son, James Ruthven, 2nd Earl of Gowrie. An independent secular lordship was established for David Murray in 1608.

== List of priors of Scone ==
- Robert (I), 1114 x 1120-1127
- Nicholas, 1127-1140
- Dionysius, 1140 - 1142 x 1147
- Thomas, 1150-1154
- Isaac, 1154-1162
- Robert (II), 1162

== List of abbots of Scone ==
- Robert (II), 1163x1164-1186
- Robert (III), 1186-1198
- Reimbald, 1198-1206
- William, 1206 x 1209-1225
- Robert (IV), 1227
- Philip, 1230-1242
- Robert (V), 1240-1270
- Nicholas, 1270-1273 x
- William, 1273 x 1284
- Hugh, x 1284-1287
- Thomas de Balmerino, 1291-1312
- Henry Man, 1303-1320
- Simon, 1325-1341
- Adam de Crail, 1343-1344
- William, 1354-1370 x 1391
- Alexander, 1370 x 1391-1412 x 1417
- Alexander de Balbirnie, 1412 x 1417-x1418
- Adam de Crannach (Aberdeen), 1418-1432
- John de Inverkeithing, 1432
- William de Skurry, 1435-1439
- James Kennedy, 1439-1447
- George Gardiner, 1445-1447
- Thomas de Camera, 1447-1458
- John Crambe, 1465-1491
- David Lermonth, 1492-1496
- Henry Abercrombie, 1492
- James Abercrombie, 1492-1514

== List of commendators ==
- Alexander Stewart de Pitcairne, 1518-1537
- Patrick Hepburn, 1538-1571
- William Lord Ruthven, 1571
- John Ruthven, 1580
- William Ruthven, 1st Earl of Gowrie, 1581-1584
- William Foularton, 1584
- James Ruthven, 2nd Earl of Gowrie, 1587-1588
- John Ruthven, 3rd Earl of Gowrie, 1592-1600
- David Murray (later Lord Scone and Viscount Stormont), 1608

== Bibliography ==
- Cowan, Ian B. & Easson, David E., Medieval Religious Houses: Scotland With an Appendix on the Houses in the Isle of Man, Second Edition, (London, 1976), pp. 97–8
- Watt, D.E.R. & Shead, N.F. (eds.), The Heads of Religious Houses in Scotland from the 12th to the 16th Centuries, The Scottish Records Society, New Series, Volume 24, (Edinburgh, 2001), pp. 198–202

== See also ==
- Viscount Stormont
- Stone of Scone
