= Prior of St Andrews =

The Prior of St Andrews was the head of the property and community of Augustinian canons of St Andrews Cathedral Priory, St Andrews, Fife, Scotland. It was established by King David I in 1140 with canons from Nostell Priory, West Yorkshire. It is possible that, initially at least, the prior of St Andrews was subordinate to the bishop as abbot, but by the 13th century the canons of St Andrews were given freedom by the bishop to elect their prior. By the end of the 13th century, the abbacy of the native canons (i.e. the Céli Dé, or Culdees) was no longer there to challenge the position of the priory, and the native canons themselves had been formed into a collegiate church.

The position of prior became secularized and the priory itself carved up into lordships in the 16th century, although the core and title remained into the 17th century. The following is a list of known priors and commendators:

== List of priors ==
- Robert I, 1140x1144-1160
- Walter I, 1160-1195
- Gilbert I, 1198
- Walter I (again), 1198x1199
- Thomas I, 1199-1211
- Simon, 1212-1225
- Henry de Norham, x 1228-1236
- John White, 1236-1258
- Gilbert, 1258-1264
- John de Haddington, 1264-1304
- Adam Mauchan, 1304-1313
- John de Forfar, 1313-1321
- John de Cowrie, 1321-1340
- William de Lothian, 1340-1354
- Thomas Biset, 1354-1363
- Stephen de Pa, 1363-1386
- Robert de Montrose, 1386x1387-1394
- James Biset, 1394-1416
- William de Camera, 1416-1417
  - John Bullock, (claimed) 1417-1418
- James de Haldeston, 1417-1443
  - John Litstar (unfruitful provision), 1417-1418
- William Bonar, 1443-1462
- David Ramsay, 1466-1469
- Walter Monypenny, 1467-1468
- William Cameron, 1469-1482
- Walter Monypenny, 1469
- John Wallace, 1469-1471
- Thomas Ruch, 1475
- Walter Monypenny, 1483-1486
- John Hepburn, 1483-1526
- Patrick Hepburn, 1524-1538

=== List of commendators ===
- James Stewart, 1538-1570
- Robert Stewart, 1570-1586
- Ludovic, Duke of Lennox, 1586-1624

== See also ==
- Bishop of St Andrews

== Bibliography ==
- Barrow, G.W.S., "The Clergy at St Andrews", in G.W.S. Barrow (ed.), The Kingdom of the Scots, (Edinburgh, 2003), pp. 189–202
- Cowan, Ian B. & Easson, David E., Medieval Religious Houses: Scotland With an Appendix on the Houses in the Isle of Man, Second Edition, (London, 1976), p. 96
- Duncan, A.A.M., "The Foundation of St Andrews Cathedral Priory, 1140", in The Scottish Historical Review, vol 84, (April, 2005), pp. 1–37
- Watt, D.E.R. & Shead, N.F. (eds.), The Heads of Religious Houses in Scotland from the 12th to the 16th Centuries, The Scottish Records Society, New Series, Volume 24, (Edinburgh, 2001), pp. 187–92
