= Alex Douglas (footballer, born 1893) =

Scottish footballer

Personal information
- Full name: Alexander Robert Douglas
- Date of birth: 15 April 1893
- Place of birth: Perth, Scotland
- Position: Centre half

Senior career*
Years	Team	Apps	(Gls)
–1911	Leith Amateurs		
1911–1913	Leith Athletic	1	(0)
1913–1915	Queen's Park	16	(2)

Managerial career
- 1927–1928: Leith Athletic
- * Club domestic league appearances and goals

Alexander Robert Douglas was a Scottish amateur footballer who played as a left half in the Scottish League for Queen's Park and Leith Athletic. He later managed Leith Athletic.

== Personal life ==
Allan served as a private in the Highland Light Infantry during the First World War.

== Career statistics ==
Appearances and goals by club, season and competition
Club	Season	League			National Cup		Other		Total	
Club	Season	Division	Apps	Goals	Apps	Goals	Apps	Goals	Apps	Goals
Leith Athletic	1911–12	Scottish Second Division	1	0	0	0	—		1	0
Queen's Park	1913–14	Scottish First Division	1	0	0	0	0	0	1	0
Queen's Park	1914–15	Scottish First Division	9	1	—		2 (Note: Appearances in Glasgow Cup)	0	11	1
Queen's Park	1915–16	Scottish First Division	6	1	—		0	0	6	1
Queen's Park	Total		16	2	0	0	2	0	18	2
Career total			17	2	0	0	2	0	19	2
