= Ernald =

Scottish bishop

Arnold of St Andrews seal, c. 1160

Ernald (or Ærnald) (died 1163) was the second Abbot of Kelso before becoming Bishop of Cell Rígmonaid (St Andrews), the highest ranking Scottish see in the period. He was elected to the see on Sunday, St. Brice's Day (13 November) 1160, and was consecrated at Dunfermline in the presence of King Máel Coluim IV the following Sunday by William, Bishop of Moray, the Papal legate. He is alleged by John Fordun to have founded the "Great Church" of St. Andrews. His short episcopate ended when he died, according to Andrew of Wyntoun, in 1163. He was buried in the church of St Regulus (Riagail).

Religious titles
| Preceded by Robert of Scone | Bishop of Cell Rígmonaid (St Andrews); 1160–63 | Succeeded by Richard the Chaplain |
