= Alexander Douglas (bishop) =

Alexander Douglas (1561–1623) was a Church of Scotland minister and served as Bishop of Moray.

== Life ==
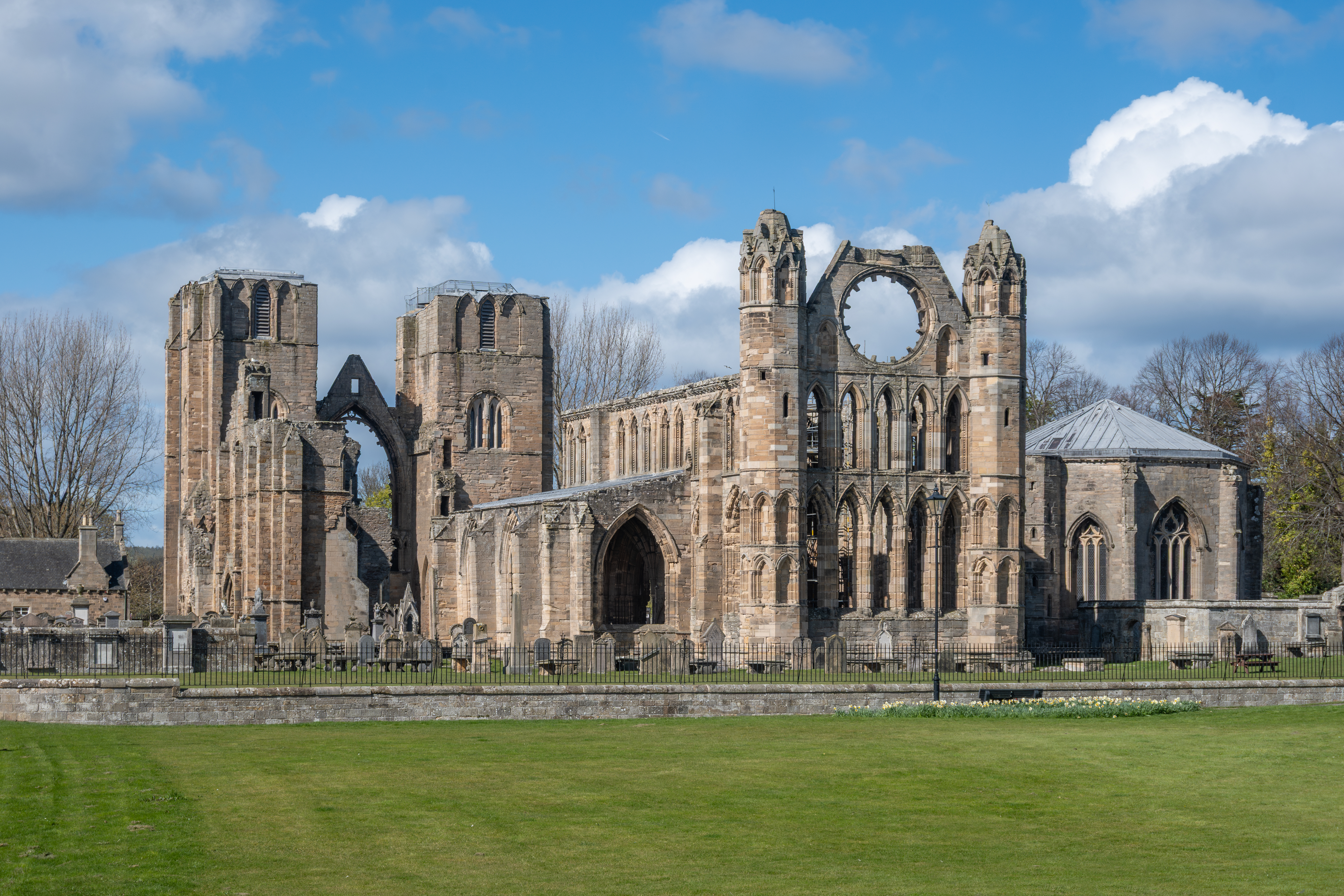
Elgin Cathedral

He was born in 1561 the son of Alexander Douglas, Provost of Elgin, and his wife Agnes Leslie. In September 1573 he was appointed minister of Alves but moved only a few weeks later to Spynie parish. In 1580 he translated to Keith and from there to Elgin in 1581.

Minister at Elgin for 17 years, he was elevated to the bishopric of Moray, receiving crown provision on 30 November 1602. He was not consecrated, for over eight years, eventually undergoing a ceremony at Edinburgh on 15 March 1611.

He died 11 May 1623, at Elgin. He was buried in his cathedral, the church of St Giles, Elgin, in a vault by a window. The structure is now ruinous.

Religious titles
| Preceded by George Douglas | Bishop of Moray; 1602–1623 | Succeeded by John Guthrie |
