= Scone Abbey =

Abbey in Perth and Kinross, Scotland

Coordinates: 56°25′29″N 3°26′9″W

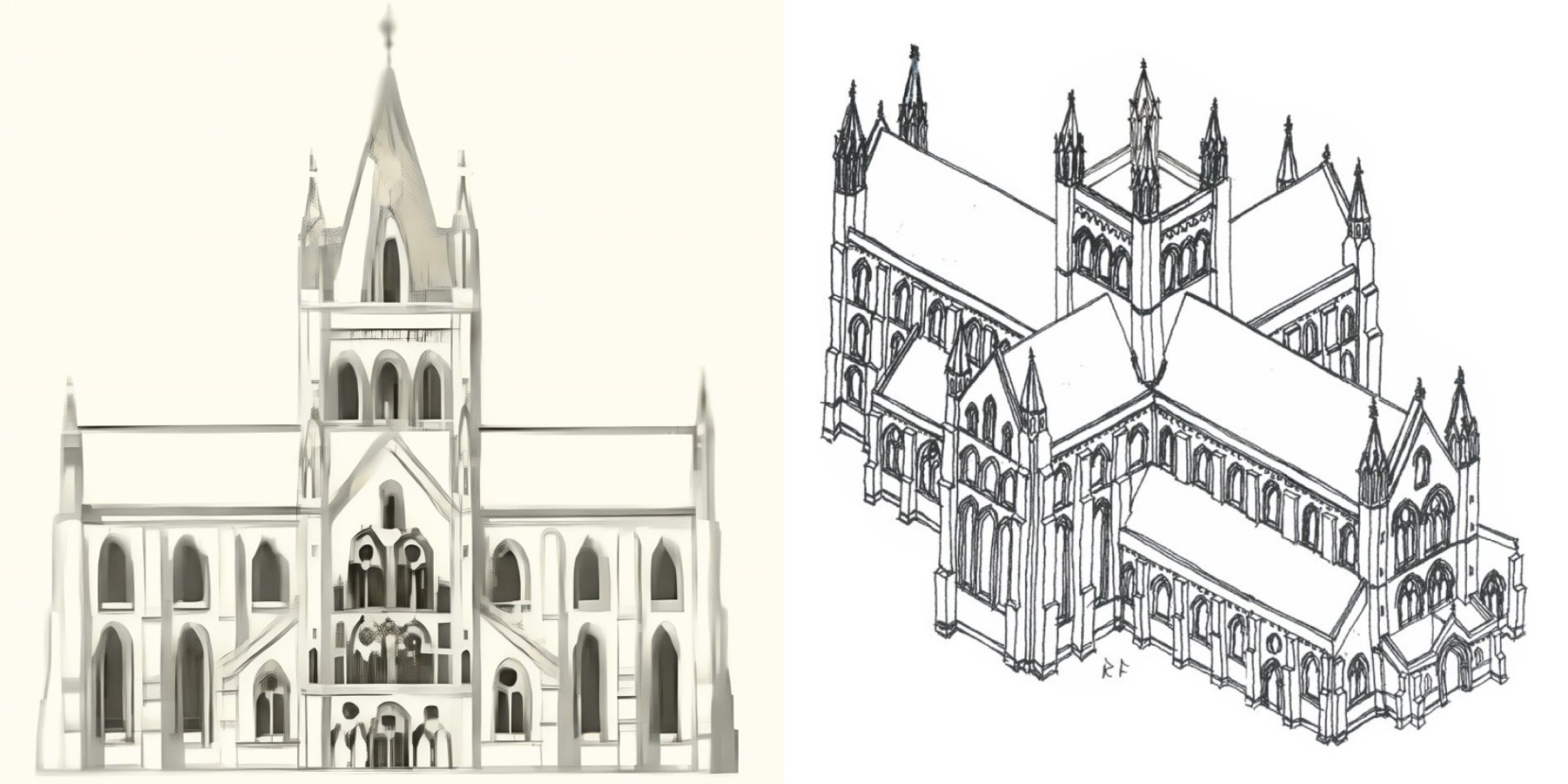
Reconstructions of Scone Abbey

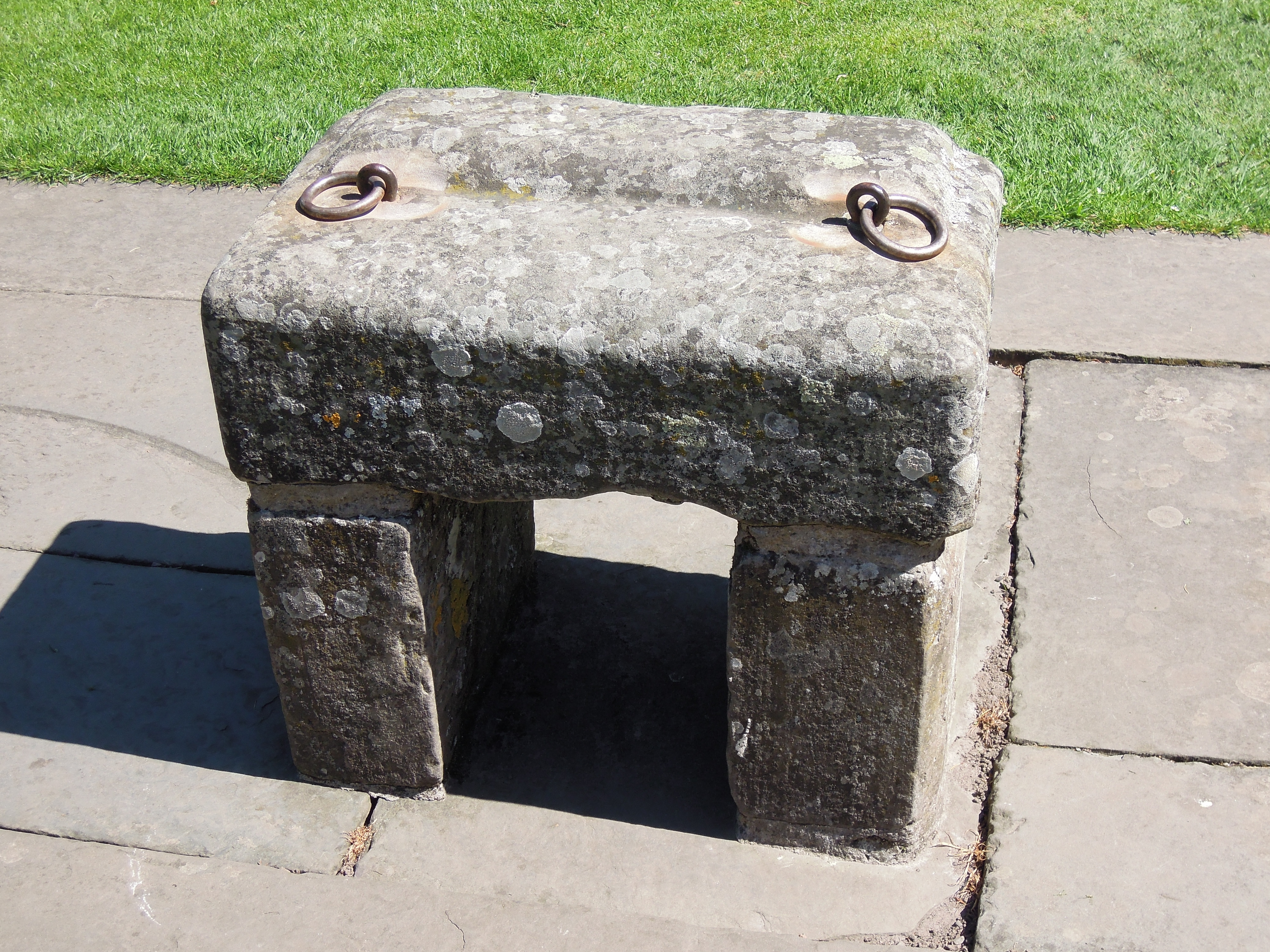
Modern replica of the Stone of Scone near the site of the Abbey

Scone Abbey (originally Scone Priory) was a house of Augustinian canons located in Scone, Perthshire (Gowrie), Scotland. Dates given for the establishment of Scone Priory have ranged from 1114 A.D. to 1122 A.D. However, historians have long believed that Scone was, before that time, the centre of the early medieval Christian cult of the Culdees (Céli Dé in medieval Irish meaning "Companions of God"). Very little is known about the Culdees but it is thought that they may have been worshiping at Scone from as early as 700 A.D. Archaeological surveys taken in 2007 suggest that Scone was a site of real significance even prior to 841 A.D., when Kenneth MacAlpin brought the Stone of Scone (or Stone of Destiny), Scotland's most prized relic and coronation stone, to Scone.

For centuries the Abbey held the Stone of Scone upon which the early Kings of Scotland were crowned. Robert the Bruce was crowned at Scone in 1306 and the last coronation was of Charles II, when he accepted the Scottish crown in 1651. The Stone of Scone is now in Perth Museum.

== Origins ==
The priory was established by six canons from Nostell Priory in West Yorkshire under the leadership of Prior Robert, who was the first prior of Scone (later Bishop of St Andrews). The foundation charter, dated 1120, was once thought to be a fake version of the original, but it is now regarded as a copy made in the late 12th century. Perhaps the copy was needed after a fire which occurred there sometime before 1163 A.D. and presumably damaged or destroyed the original. Scone Priory suffered a similar destruction of records during the Wars of Scottish Independence. The royal assembly site at Scone originated as a power centre in the early Middle Ages.

== Transition to abbey status ==
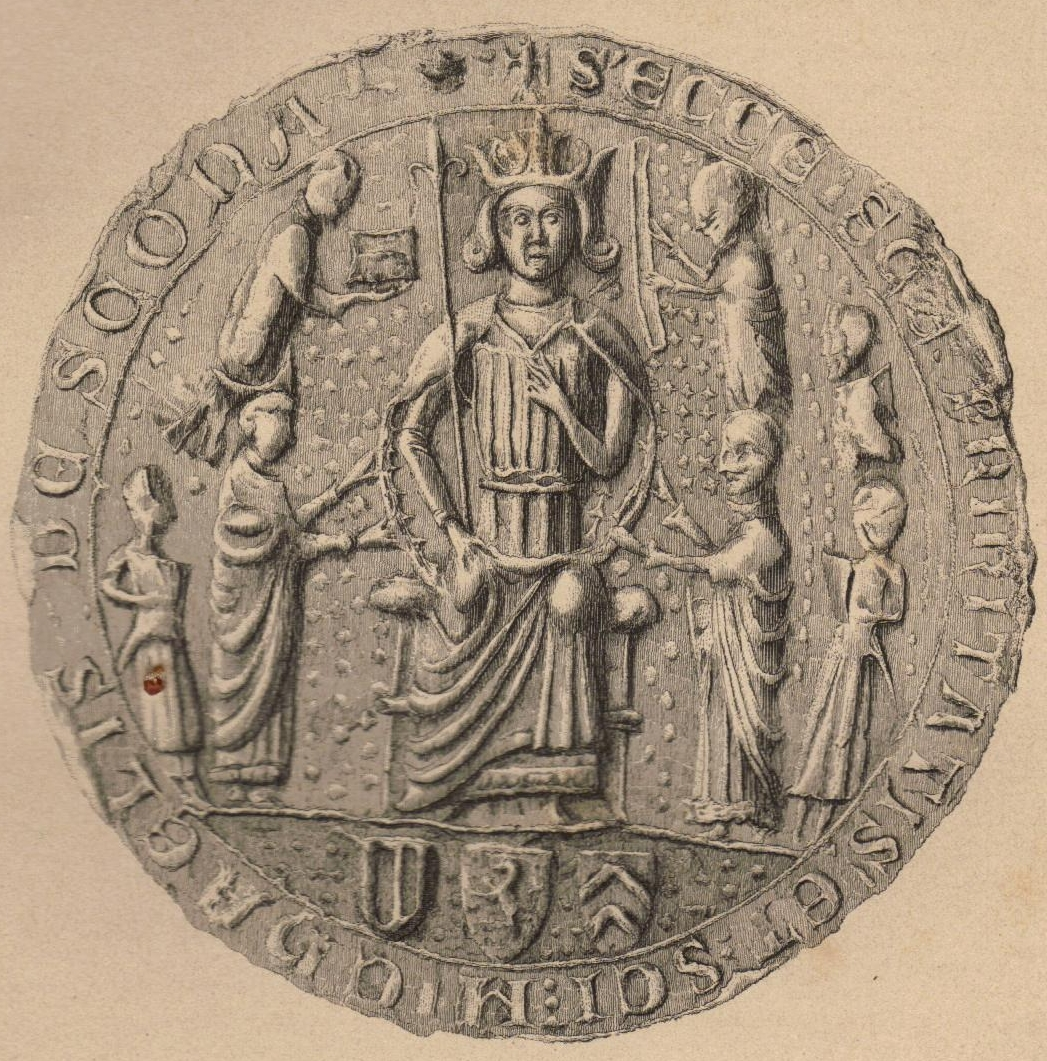
Seal of Scone Abbey

In December 1164, during the reign of King Máel Coluim IV, Scone Priory was raised to an abbey. Scone Abbey had important royal functions, since it was located next to the coronation site of Scottish kings and housed the Stone of Destiny until its theft by King Edward I of England. Scone Abbey was, according to King Máel Coluim IV, "in principali sede regni nostri" (RRS, no. 243; trs. "in the principal seat of our kingdom"). As such, Scone Abbey was one of the chief residences of the Scottish kings, who were hosted by the abbot during their stay at Scone. Most likely the king stayed in the abbot's own rooms within the abbot's palace. It is very likely that the abbey buildings (now gone) overlapped with the modern palace. The abbey also had relics of a now obscure saint by the name of St Fergus (also Fergustian), which made it a popular place of pilgrimage. Although the abbey long remained famous for its music since Robert Carver produced there some of Europe's best late medieval choral music into the late 16th century, its status declined over time.

In March 1540 one of the canons, Andrew Murehead, sent a gift of rose water made at the abbey to James V at Stirling Castle.

=== Scottish Reformation ===
In 1559 during the early days of the Scottish Reformation the abbey fell victim to a Protestant mob from Dundee who were whipped into a zealous frenzy by the reformer John Knox. The abbey was burned to the ground. In 1581 it was erected into a temporal lordship. The abbey estates were later granted to Lord Ruthven, who later became the Earl of Gowrie. Lord Ruthven held extensive estates in Scotland including Ruthven Castle near Perth, now called Huntingtower Castle, and Dirleton Castle. The Ruthvens rebuilt the Abbot's Palace of the old abbey as a grand residence in 1580. In 1600, James VI charged the family with treason after the Gowrie Conspiracy, banned the use of the name "Ruthven" and confiscated their states. The Gowrie lands at Scone including the Abbot's Palace were granted to Sir David Murray of Gospetrie, who later was made the 1st Lord Scone and Viscount Stormont, as a reward for interceding on the king's behalf to quell the people of Perth in the chaotic aftermath of the Gowrie Conspiracy.

After the reformation in 1559, Scottish abbeys disappeared as institutions, although not overnight, as some suggest. There are existing documents describing repairs made to the spire of the abbey church dating from A.D. 1620. Scone Abbey and its attendant parish ceased to function in 1640 and was made a secular lordship first for the Earl of Gowrie, and then for Sir David Murray of Gospertie. The property and lordship have been in the possession of the Murrays of Scone ever since. Later, this branch of the Murray clan became the Earls of Mansfield. Scone Abbey flourished for over four hundred years.

== Rediscovery ==
The precise location of Scone Abbey had long remained a mystery, but a team of archaeologists (run by Doctor Oliver O'Grady) pinpointed the location using geophysical survey. The find revealed the structure to have been somewhat larger than had been imagined and revealed that the Moot Hill had at some point been surrounded by a ditch and palisade; marking it out not as a defensive position but as a hugely significant sanctum within which kings professed their vows to the people of Scotland. A stylised illustration of the abbey on one of its seals suggests that it was a major Romanesque building, with a central tower crowned with a spire. In 2008 an archaeological dig at the abbey revealed burials with three complete human skeletons.

== Burials ==
- Robert II of Scotland
- Maud, Countess of Huntingdon
- Thomas de Rossy (Bishop of the Isles)

== See also ==
- Abbot of Scone, for a list of priors, abbots, and commendators

== Bibliography ==
- Barrow, G.W.S. (ed.), The Acts of Malcolm IV King of Scots 1153-1165, Together with Scottish Royal Acts Prior to 1153 not included in Sir Archibald Lawrie's '"Early Scottish Charters', in Regesta Regum Scottorum (= RRS), Volume I, (Edinburgh, 1960)
- Cowan, Ian B. & Easson, David E., Medieval Religious Houses: Scotland with an Appendix on the Houses in the Isle of Man, Second Edition, (London, 1976), pp. 97–8
- Fawcett, Richard, "The Buildings of Scone Abbey", in Richard Welander, David J. Breeze & Thomas Owen Clancy (eds.), The Stone of Destiny: Artefact and Icon, Society of Antiquaries of Scotland, Monograph Series Number 22, (Edinburgh, 2003), pp. 169–80
- Watt, D.E.R. & Shead, N.F. (eds.), The Heads of Religious Houses in Scotland from the 12th to the 16th Centuries, The Scottish Records Society, New Series, Volume 24, (Edinburgh, 2001), pp. 198–202
