= Palazuelo de Vedija =

Coordinates: 41°56′N 5°08′W

- Coat of arms

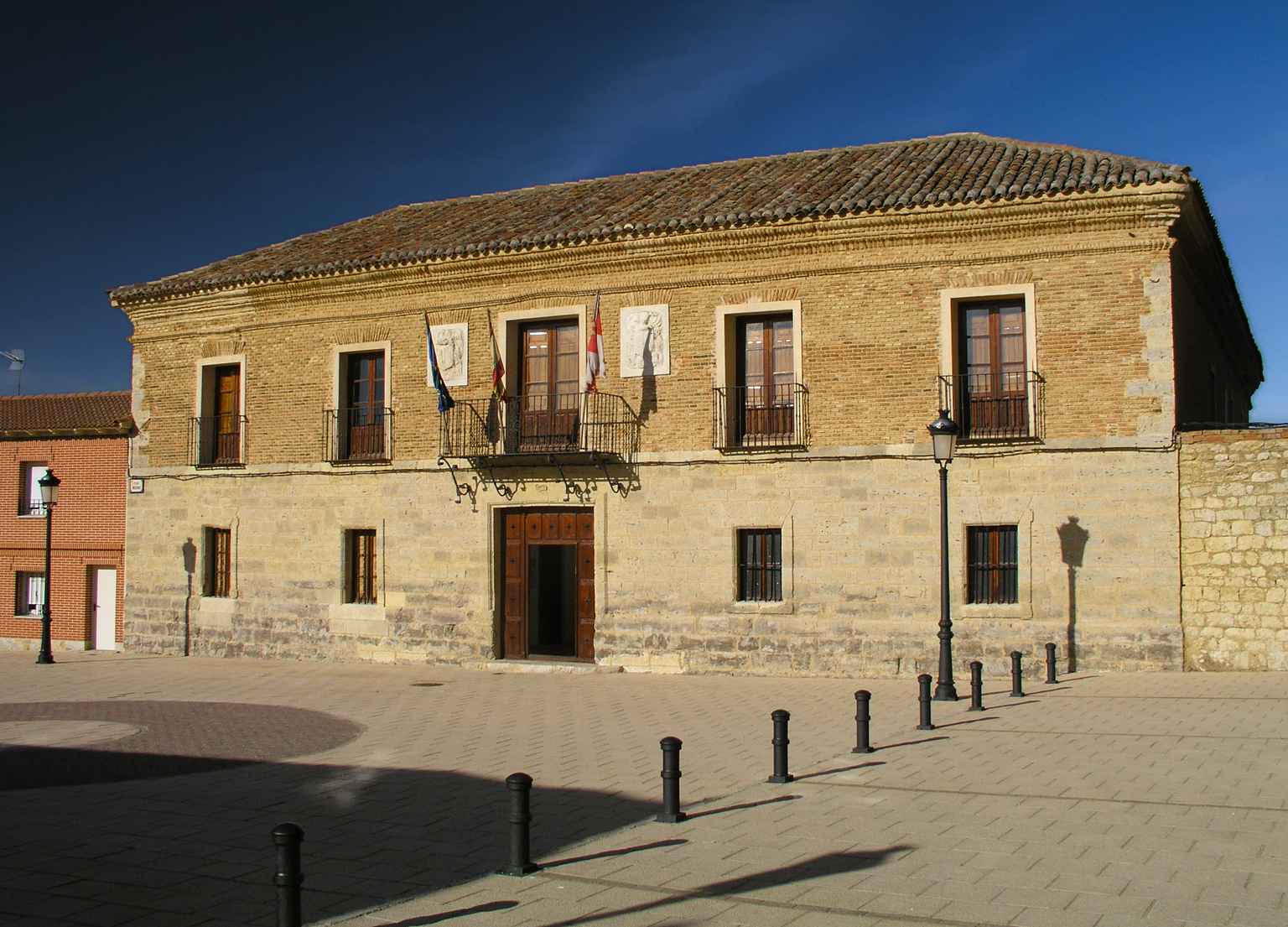
- Town hall.
- Country: Spain
- Autonomous community: Castile and León
- Province: Valladolid
- Municipality: Palazuelo de Vedija

Area
  - Total: 32 km^{2} (12 sq mi)

Population (2025-01-01)
  - Total: 164
  - Density: 5.1/km^{2} (13/sq mi)
- Time zone: UTC+1 (CET)
  - Summer (DST): UTC+2 (CEST)
- Climate: Csb

Palazuelo de Vedija is a municipality located in the province of Valladolid, Castile and León, Spain. According to the 2004 census (INE), the municipality has a population of 241 inhabitants.
