= Durie =

Durie may refer to:

- Andre Durie (1981– ), Canadian football player
- Andrew Durie, (?? -1588), bishop
- Arohia Durie, professor of Māori education
- Clan Durie, a Scots clan
- Dave Durie (1931–2016), English football player
- David Durie (1944– ), British civil servant and former governor of Gibraltar
- Edward Taihakurei Durie (1940– ), New Zealand judge
- George Durie (c. 1496- 1577), Scots abbot
- Gordon Durie (1965– ), Scots footballer
- Ian Dury (1942–2000), English rock and roll singer-songwriter
- Jamie Durie (1970– ), Australian horticulturalist
- Jo Durie (1960– ) tennis player
- Mason Durie (community leader) (1889–1971), tribal leader from New Zealand
- Mason Durie (psychiatrist) (1938– ), New Zealand professor
- Mark Durie Australian vicar and author
- Raymond Durie of Durie (1905–1999), Scots soldier and clan chief

== See also ==
- Dury (disambiguation)
