= Abbot of Tongland =

The Abbot of Tongland (later Commendator of Tongland) was the head of the Premonstratensian (originally Cistercian) monastic community of Tongland Abbey in the historical county of Kirkcudbrightshire in Dumfries and Galloway. The following is a list of abbots and commendators:

== List of abbots ==
- Helias, 1209x1222
- Alexander, 1273-1296
- Walter, 1332-1347
- Gilbert, 1381
- Gilbert de Gamdia, 1439
- Gilbert MacDowell, 1458
- Patrick MacChaquhirky (or MacCathroge), 1458-x 1473
- William Douglas, 1473 x 1476-1479
- Thomas Livingston, 1479-1481
- William Wylie, x 1481
- Andrew Muirhead, 1481 -1483
- Damian de Falcutiis, 1504-1509

== List of commendators ==
- David Arnot, 1509-1526
- William Stewart, 1529-1531
- Henry Wemyss, 1530-1541
- Andrew Dury, 1541-1558
- Alexander Gordon, 1559-1575
- Archibald Crawford, 1564
- John Gordon, 1576-1586
- Roger Gordon, 1578
- George Gordon, 1586-1588
- William Melville, 1588-1613

== Bibliography ==
- Watt, D.E.R., Fasti Ecclesiae Scotinanae Medii Aevi ad annum 1638, 2nd Draft, (St Andrews, 1969)
- Watt, D.E.R. & Shead, N.F. (eds.), The Heads of Religious Houses in Scotland from the 12th to the 16th Centuries, The Scottish Records Society, New Series, Volume 24, (Edinburgh, 2001), p. 210-13

== See also ==
- Tongland Abbey
