= Traphagen =

- William C. Traphagen (1837–1894), American attorney and New York State Senator
- Henry Traphagen (1842–1918), Mayor of Jersey City, New Jersey
- Oliver Green Traphagen (1854–1932), American architect
- Charles Duryee Traphagen (1862–1947), American publisher of the Nebraska State Journal
- John C. Traphagen (1889–1979), American banker

== See also ==
- Traphagen School of Fashion
- Traphagen Tavern (better known today as the Beekman Arms Inn)
