= Duryee =

Duryee or Duryée is a surname. Notable people with the surname include:

- Abram Duryée (1815–1890), American Union Army general
- Charles Duryee Traphagen (1862–1947), American newspaper publisher
- Jacob Eugene Duryée (1839–1918), American Union Army lieutenant colonel

== See also ==
- Duryea (surname)
