= David Arnot (bishop) =

Scottish prelate of the Catholic Church from 1509 to 1526

David Arnot O.S.A.
- Bishop of Galloway
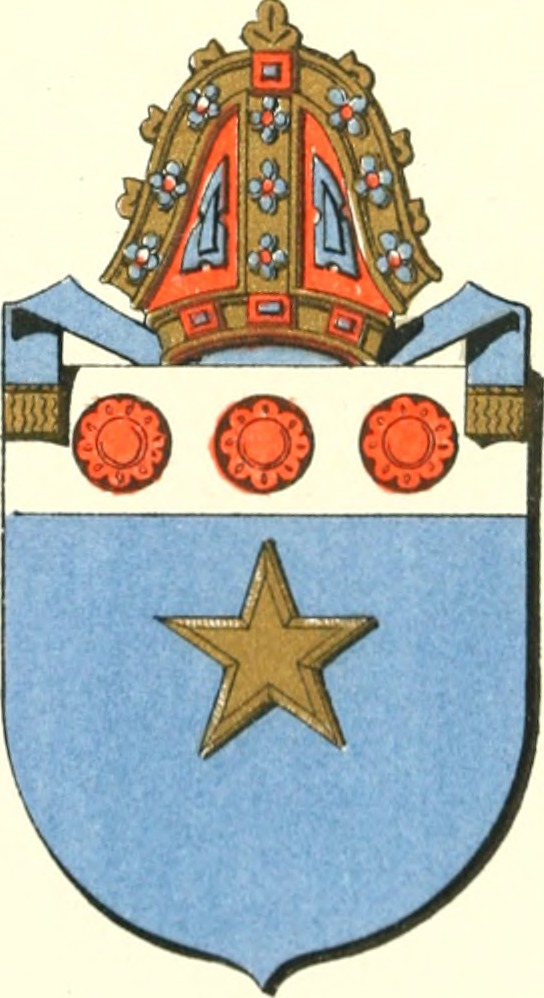
- Coat of arms of David Arnot
- Church: Catholic Church
- See: Diocese of Galloway
- In office: 1509–1536
- Predecessor: James Beaton
- Successor: Henry Wemyss
- Previous posts: Archdeacon of Lothian (1498–1503); Abbot of Cambuskenneth (1503–1509)

Personal details
- Born: before 1497
- Died: before 10 July 1536 and 25 August 1537

David Arnot (before 1497 – between 10 July 1536 and 25 August 1537) was a Scottish prelate of the Catholic Church. He was the Bishop of Galloway (Scotland) from 1509 to 1526. He was from the Arnot family of Arnot, Fife.

== Early career ==
=== Archdeacon of Lothian ===
Arnot was Rector of Kirkforthar, Fife, receiving crown presentation to that parish church on 19 September 1497. He received crown presentation to become Archdeacon of Lothian on 26 October 1498.

=== Provost of Bothwell ===
Arnot is found to be provost of the collegiate church of Bothwell in a document dating to 20 September 1499, a document recording a grant made to Arnot by the king of a tenement in Linlithgow; it is not known when he attained this position. The last known provost is found as provost no later than 26 January 1468; and although this man, Patrick Leich, did not die until either 1493 or 1494, it is not known if Leich still held this position at his death. Arnot was provost there no later than 30 November 1502, when James Beaton is attested as provost.

=== Abbot of Cambuskenneth ===
After the death of Henry Abercrombie, Abbot of Cambuskenneth, on 29 March 1503, Arnot was provided to succeed him. He is found as abbot-elect on 30 May and then as full abbot on 28 November. Arnot led the Abbey of Cambuskenneth for over five years.

== Bishop of Galloway ==
In November 1508, after the translation of James Beaton from Bishop of Galloway to Archbishop of Glasgow, Arnot received crown nomination to the papacy to fill the vacant see of Galloway. He was provided to the bishopric on 29 January 1509, and granted the temporalities of the see on 27 May as "Bishop of Candida Casa [Whithorn] and of the Chapel Royal". Since 1504, the position of Bishop of Galloway and that of Dean of the Chapel Royal at Stirling went together.

Arnot's position was supplemented in 1509, when he received crown nomination to receive Tongland Abbey in commendam, after the resignation of the previous Abbot of Tongland Peter Damian de Falcutiis. Bishop Arnot was provided as Commendator of Tongland on 18 April 1510, for which on 7 May he paid the papacy 50 florins.

Arnot was sent on an embassy on behalf of King James V of Scotland in April 1516 to Henry VIII of England, for which he received a royal letter of protection on 3 April 1516; he was accompanied by, among others, the Bishop of Dunblane, the Bishop of Caithness, the Earl of Cassillis, the Earl of Morton and the Earl of Eglinton.

Arnot witnessed a royal charter on 18 February 1517, and another on 28 March 1522.

Arnot resigned his bishopric on 23 or 24 January 1526, to Henry Wemyss, with right of return and for a pension. Although Arnot also resigned Tongland for lifelong pension with right of return on vacancy, Arnot may have effectively held on to Tongland for a few more years; repeated crown nominations of Wemyss to Tongland failed, apparently because of Arnot, while William Stewart, a secular canon of Glasgow Cathedral, also got crown nomination until the Pope finally agreed to give Wemyss the commend in 1530, with Stewart resigning his rights.

Arnot is found consenting to a deed of Bishop Henry on 7 June 1535, and to another on 10 July 1536. This was the last time Arnot can be found in the sources; he was dead by 25 August 1537, though he could have died at any time before this and after 10 July 1536.

== Notes ==
Religious titles
Preceded by Alexander Gifford	Archdeacon of Lothian; 1498 – 1503	Succeeded by John Brady
Preceded by Patrick Leich	Provost of Bothwell Collegiate Church × 1499 – 1500 × 1502	Succeeded by James Beaton
Preceded by Henry Abercrombie	Abbot of Cambuskenneth; 1503 – 1509	Succeeded by Andrew McBreck
Preceded by James Beaton	Bishop of Galloway; 1508 – 1526	Succeeded by Henry Wemyss
Preceded by James Beaton	Dean of the Chapel Royal; 1508 – 1526	Succeeded by Henry Wemyss
Preceded by John Damian	Commendator of Tongland; 1509 – 1526	Succeeded by William Stewart
