= Clan Durie =

Scottish family tree

- Crest: A crescent Or
- Motto: CONFIDO (I trust)

Profile
- Region: Lowlands
- District: Fife

Chief
- Andrew Durie of Durie
- Chief of the Name and Arms of Durie
- Historic seat: Burntisland Castle

Durie is a Scottish family of the Scottish Lowlands, not a Scottish clan as sometimes reported.

== History ==
=== Origins of the Family ===
The origin of the surname is often said to be from the French Du Roi',. but this is known to be an error. Nor were they Normans, or "travelled to Scotland in 1069 as part of the entourage of Queen Margaret of Scotland". Modern historical research shows that in 1260 or shortly thereafter, a younger son of the Earl of Strathearn was granted the land in Fife already called Durie and took the name, becoming “of Durie” or, in the Anglo-French used in documents of that time, “de Durie”. A much-quoted reference to the Duries being in Fife from 1119 is based on a mis-reading of a carved stone.

The Duries had the estate of Craigluscar which is near Dunfermline, Fife and the lands called Durie in the parish of Scoonie near Leven, Fife. A house that was built in Craigluscar possibly around 1520 has a stone bearing the initials of George Durie and his wife Margaret Bruce. The family's prominence in Fife is found in charters throughout the thirteenth and fourteenth centuries. In about 1258 Duncan de Dury was a witness for Malise, Earl of Strathern. Others bearing the name who appear in documentary evidence include Francis de Douery (c.1250), Malisius de Douery (c.1350), Michael de Douery (c.1373), John de Douery (c.1406) and Richard de Douer (c.1405). It is from Richard de Douer that the main chiefly line is descended from.

In 1382 Burntisland Castle (now known as Rossend Castle) was built and it includes a tablet over the entrance bearing the Durie arms and the date 1554.

=== 16th and 17th centuries ===
Burntisland Castle was the most extensive of Durie properties and in 1563 it was occupied by Mary, Queen of Scots. However it was confiscated by the Crown during the Scottish Reformation.

George Durie reached high offices in church and state, becoming Commendator and the last Abbot of Dunfermline before the Reformation. He also appeared in Parliament between 1540 and 1554, was appointed an Extraordinary Lord in 1541, became Lord of the Articles, a member of the Governor's Secret Counsale in 1543, a Lord of Council and Session and Keeper of the Privy Seal of Scotland. George Durie was a staunch supporter of Queen Mary and as a bitter opponent of the new faith he brought his own cousin, John Durie, a monk to trial for proclaiming the new teaching. The Queen and her mother, the Queen-Dowager wrote several letters to George Durie while in distress and sent him on diplomatic missions to the court of France. Durie later fled there taking with him the relics of Queen Margaret for safe keeping.

George Durie's brother was Andrew Durie who was Abbot of Melrose and Bishop of Galloway. Andrew Durie was despised by the religious reformer John Knox and was imprisoned in Edinburgh Castle in 1580. Meanwhile, Robert Durie, minister of Anstruther, was exiled for attending a proscribed General Assembly of the Church.

George Durie's sons, John and George, were both educated at the Scots' Colleges in Paris. There is little doubt that John was the Jesuit Durie who was implicated in a conspiracy to release Mary, Queen of Scots and depose Elizabeth I of England. Another of George's sons was Henry Durie who held the lands of Craigluscar and from whom the main line of the family runs. His wife was Margaret MacBeth who was renowned for her skill with herbs. Margaret was attended royal births at Dunfermline Palace and was a favourite of Anne of Denmark.

In the late 17th century another George Durie was a Captain in King Louis XIV's Scots Guards of France, and also a provost of Dunfermline.

== Chief of the Name and Arms of Durie ==
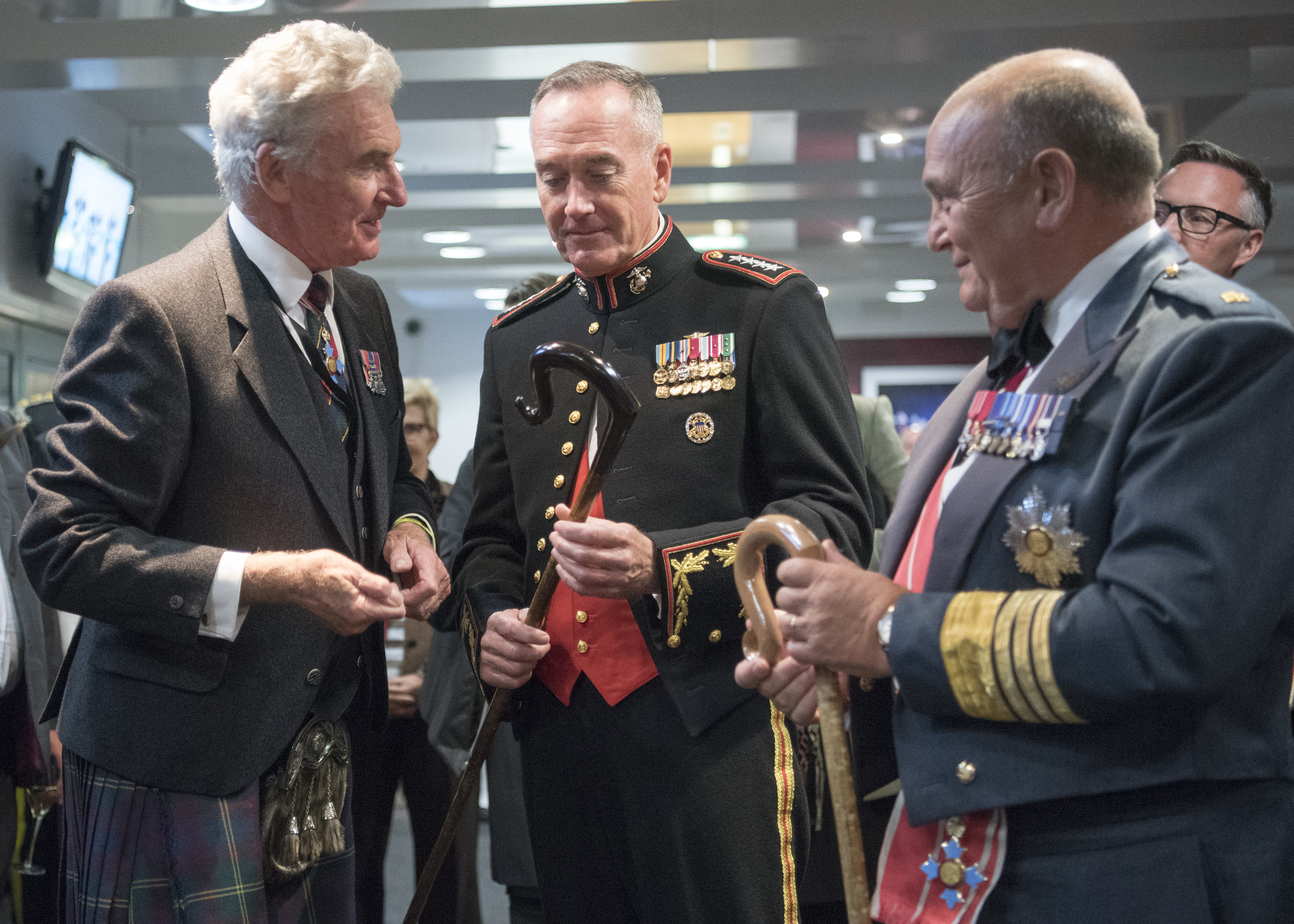
Andrew Durie (left) with General Joseph Dunford and Sir Stuart Peach

The Duries were chiefless for some time until the recognition of Lt-Col Raymond Durie of Durie in 1988. He established his descent through his grandmother, Elizabeth Durie of Craigluscar from Abbot George. Raymond had a distinguished military career which spanned 35 years with Argyll and Sutherland Highlanders. His actions were distinguished during the Chinese Civil War and Japan's invasion of China. He died in 1999 and the chieftainship passed to his son, the present chief Andrew Durie of Durie, CBE

== Lands and castles ==
The main seat of the family of Durie of that Ilk was Durie in the parish of Scoonie, just outside Leven, Fife. Another branch, that of the present Chief, had Craigluscar, near Dunfermline, Fife. Briefly, they held Rossend Castle (Burntisland, Fife) and Grange (near Kinghorn, Fife).

== See also ==
- Scottish clan
