= Henry Wemyss =

- Bishop of Galloway
- Church: Roman Catholic Church
- See: Diocese of Galloway
- In office: 1526–1541
- Predecessor: David Arnot
- Successor: Andrew Durie
- Previous posts: Official of Galloway (1512 × 1517–1522 × 1526); Archdeacon of Galloway (1513 × 1522–1531)

Orders
- Consecration: after 1 March 1526

Personal details
- Born: unknown unknown
- Died: 14 March × 21 May 1541

Henry Wemyss (died 1541) was a prelate from the 16th century Kingdom of Scotland. He appears in the sources in the bishopric of Galloway for the first time in 1517, and rose to become Bishop of Galloway in 1526, a position he held until his death in 1541.

== Biography ==
=== Origin ===
He was said to have been the son of John Wemyss, fifth son of Sir John Wemyss of Wemyss, by a daughter of Sir John Arnot of Arnot (in Fife); if true, this would make him a relative of David Arnot, sometime Bishop of Galloway who resigned that bishopric in Wemyss' favour; Robert Keith thought he may have been related to King James V, as a brother, but this was a mistake based on textual misreading (mispunctuating) which resulted in Henry's name being confused with that of James Stewart, Earl of Moray, the King's actual half-brother.

=== Earlier career ===
Henry is found as the Official of the diocese of Galloway on 8 February 1517, and again on 16 January 1522; the last known holder of this position occurred on 12 March 1512, so that Henry must have taken this position at some point between 1512 and 1517. Henry was parson of the parish church of Auchterderran (Outherdekan), Fife, in the diocese of St Andrews, and is found to be Archdeacon of Galloway on 9 December 1522; like his position as Official, it is not known when he ascended the archdeaconry, and the last occurrence of a predecessor occurs on 9 November 1513.

=== Bishopric of Galloway ===
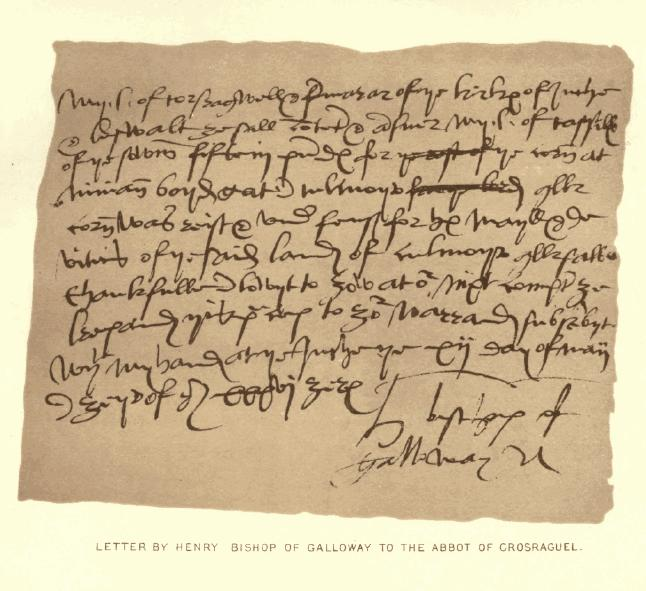
The letter from Bishop Henry to Abbot William Kennedy of Crossraguel; Bishop Henry's signature is visible in the bottom-right.

Henry Wemyss received provision to the bishopric of Galloway (with the position of Dean of the Chapel Royal, Stirling) when David Arnot resigned his bishopric on 23/4 January 1526; Arnot retained right of return upon any future vacancy and half of the revenue of the diocese. Although Arnot also resigned his position as Commendator of Tongland for, once again, a lifelong pension and with right of return on vacancy, Arnot may have effectively held on to Tongland Abbey for a few more years; repeated crown nominations of Wemyss to Tongland failed, apparently because of Arnot, while William Stewart, a canon of Glasgow Cathedral, also got crown nomination until the Pope finally agreed to give Bishop Henry Wemyss Tongland Abbey in commendam in 1530, with Stewart resigning his rights.

The commend of Dundrennan Abbey came into Wemyss' possession after a crown nomination on 11 December 1529, to which he was admitted on 24 April 1530. Henry also retained the Archdeaconry of Galloway after becoming bishop, at least until he resigned the position to Patrick Arnot on 11 February 1531. Bishop Wemyss was a frequent attender of parliament, and his name occurs frequently as a witness to charters under the Great Seal of Scotland. He appeared for the last time in the latter capacity on 14 March 1541. He died soon after this date, and was certainly dead by 21 May. On 25 May, Andrew Durie, Abbot of Melrose, was put in charge of the vacant temporalities of Galloway and Tongland; Durie indeed succeeded Wemyss to these positions later in the year.

There survive some correspondences between Bishop Henry Wemyss and William Kennedy, Abbot of Crossraguel, written in the English language. Bishop Henry and Abbot William have been said to have been close friends. Two letters sent by Bishop Wemyss, dated to 5 July, and to 5 December 1536, survive; the first was addressed to "Jhone Makmaister and maister Patrik Ryschert", officials at Crossraguel Abbey, and the second to Abbot William; they concern certain revenues pertaining to one Ninian Boyd and his land at Culmoyr (Cùl Mòr, "big back"), over which the bishop may have had rights; Culmoyr was in the now defunct parish of Clashant, later belonging to the MacDowall kindred of Garthland. Bishop Wemyss' signature has survived on the letter to Abbot William.

== Notes ==
Religious titles
Preceded by David Abercrombie	Official of Galloway; 1517 – 1522 × 1526	Succeeded by Andrew Arnot
Preceded by Alexander Shaw	Archdeacon of Galloway; 1513 × 1522 – 1531	Succeeded by Patrick Arnot
Preceded by David Arnot	Bishop of Galloway; 1526 – 1541	Succeeded by Andrew Durie
Preceded by David Arnot	Dean of the Chapel Royal; 1526 – 1541	Succeeded by Andrew Durie
Preceded by David Arnot/ William Stewart	Commendator of Tongland; 1530 – 1541	Succeeded by Andrew Durie
Preceded by John Maxwell	Commendator of Dundrennan; 1529 – 1541	Succeeded by Adam Blackadder
