= Duryea =

Duryea may refer to:

- Duryea (surname)
- Duryea Motor Wagon Company, first American automobile company
- Duryea, Pennsylvania, a borough in Luzerne County
