= Andrew Durie =

Scottish bishop

- Bishop of Galloway
- Church: Roman Catholic Church
- See: Diocese of Galloway
- In office: 1541–1558
- Predecessor: Henry Wemyss
- Successor: Alexander Gordon
- Previous post(s): Abbot of Melrose (1525–1541)

Personal details
- Born: Late 15th century Probably Durie, Fife
- Died: Edinburgh 1558; Edinburgh

Andrew Durie (died 1558), bishop of Galloway and abbot of Melrose, was the son of John Durie of Durie in Fife, and brother to George Durie, abbot of Dunfermline and archdeacon of St. Andrews.

== Biography ==
=== Early career and abbacy of Melrose ===
Both brothers, Andrew and George Durie, entered the church under the patronage of their uncle, Archbishop James Beaton of Glasgow, who named them abbots in 1526. The appointment of Andrew Durie to the abbey of Melrose was made in opposition to the will of James V, who had already asked the pope to grant the charge to John Maxwell, brother of Robert Maxwell, Lord Maxwell, but letters of commendation to the pope in favour of Durie were obtained by fraud. Sir Christopher Dacre, in a letter dated 2 December 1526, says that Durie, "a monk of Melrose Abbey, will probably hold the place, notwithstanding that the king and the lords in this parliament have enacted that no Scotchman should purchase a benefice at the pope's hand, without license of the king and the lords of council".

James wrote to Cardinal Wolsey on the subject, and requested him to lay the matter before Henry VIII, so that the English king might use his influence with the pope to annul the appointment of Durie. Maxwell's friends obtained from the Scottish parliament a revocation of the letters sent to the pope in Durie's behalf. The Earl of Arran also wrote to Cardinal Wolsey to remind him that he had promised before to obtain the pope's consent to the appointment of his friends to the bishopric of Moray and to the abbey of Melrose, both of which charges were then vacant. The 'Vatican Papers' contain a letter from Henry VIII to the pope on the subject, dated Hertford, 2 December 1524, in which he recommends John Maxwell of Dundrennan to the abbey of Melrose. All these efforts were of no avail.

Maxwell, who had entered on the functions of abbot, had to retire in favour of Durie, who personally had nothing to recommend him as a churchman to any office whatever. He was dissolute and profane. His talk was mixed with terms derived from dice and cards. He had also a vulgar habit of making trivial rhymes. In giving his advice to the queen-regent, Mary of Guise, regarding a concourse of protestant preachers that had assembled in Edinburgh, he is reported to have said: "Madame, because they are come without order, I rede ye, send them to the border".

=== Bishop of Galloway ===
On 2 July 1541 he was made an extraordinary lord of session, and was on the following day recommended to the pope for the see of Galloway. The king stipulated that before receiving the bishopric he should resign Melrose, although he might hold the abbey of Tongland. He is, however, spoken of as bishop and abbot of Melrose in 1556. He accompanied the queen-regent on her visit to France in 1550. He was an inveterate enemy to protestantism, and vowed openly that, in spite of God, so long as they that then were prelates lived, that word called the gospel should never be preached within the realm.

He died in Edinburgh in his house on Melrose Close on or soon after 1 September (St Giles Day) 1558 from the shock occasioned by a riot in Edinburgh when the Protestants broke up the procession in honour of St Giles.

Knox asserts that Durie had a very bad character. He was succeeded in the bishopric by Alexander Gordon. Sources

== Notes ==
Religious titles
Preceded by John Maxwell	Abbot of Melrose; 1525–1541	Succeeded by James Stewart
Preceded by Henry Wemyss	Bishop of Galloway; 1541–1558	Succeeded by Alexander Gordon
