= Duryea (surname) =

Duryea is a surname. Notable people with the surname include:

- Charles Duryea (1861–1938), American automotive pioneer
- Charles T. Duryea (1832–1899), American politician
- Dan Duryea (1907–1968), American actor
- Harmanus B. Duryea (1815–1884), American lawyer, politician, and militia officer
- Herman B. Duryea (1862–1916), American race horse owner and breeder
- J. Frank Duryea, American automotive pioneer
- Jesse Duryea (1859–1942), American baseball pitcher
- Laura Duryea (born 1983), Australian rules footballer
- Perry B. Duryea (state senator) (1891–1968), New York state senator 1942–45, and Conservation Commissioner 1945–54
- Perry B. Duryea Jr. (1921–2004), Speaker of the New York State Assembly 1969–1974
- Peter Duryea (1939–2013), American actor
- Taylor Duryea (born 1991), Australian rules footballer
- Tim Duryea (born 1964), American basketball coach
- Townsend Duryea (1823–1888), American photographer
  - Sanford Duryea (1833–1903), photographer, brother of Townsend

== See also ==
- Dury (disambiguation)
- Durie
