= Dunfermline Abbey =

Abbey in Fife, Scotland

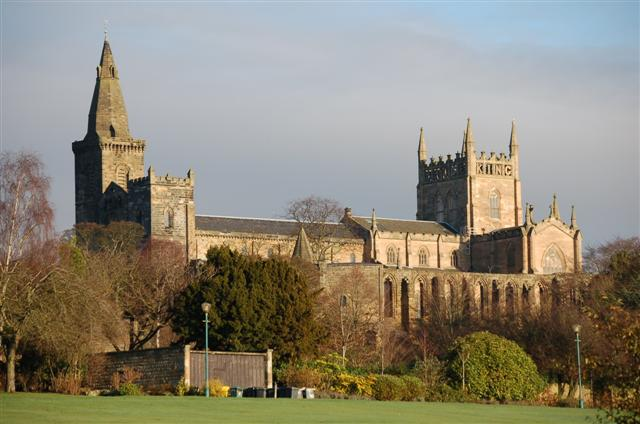
- Dunfermline Abbey from Pittencrieff Park
- Dunfermline Abbey
- 56°04′12″N 3°27′49″W
- Location: Dunfermline, Scotland
- Denomination: Church of Scotland
- Previous denomination: Roman Catholic
- Website: www.dunfermlineabbey.co.uk

History
- Status: Active
- Founded: 1128

Architecture
- Functional status: Parish Church
- Architect: William Burn
- Style: Romanesque
- Completed: 1250

Dunfermline Abbey is a Church of Scotland parish church in Dunfermline, Scotland. The church occupies the site of the ancient chancel and transepts of a large medieval Benedictine abbey, which was sacked in 1560 during the Scottish Reformation and permitted to fall into disrepair. Part of the old abbey church continued in use at that time and some parts of the abbey infrastructure still remain.

== History ==
=== Early history ===
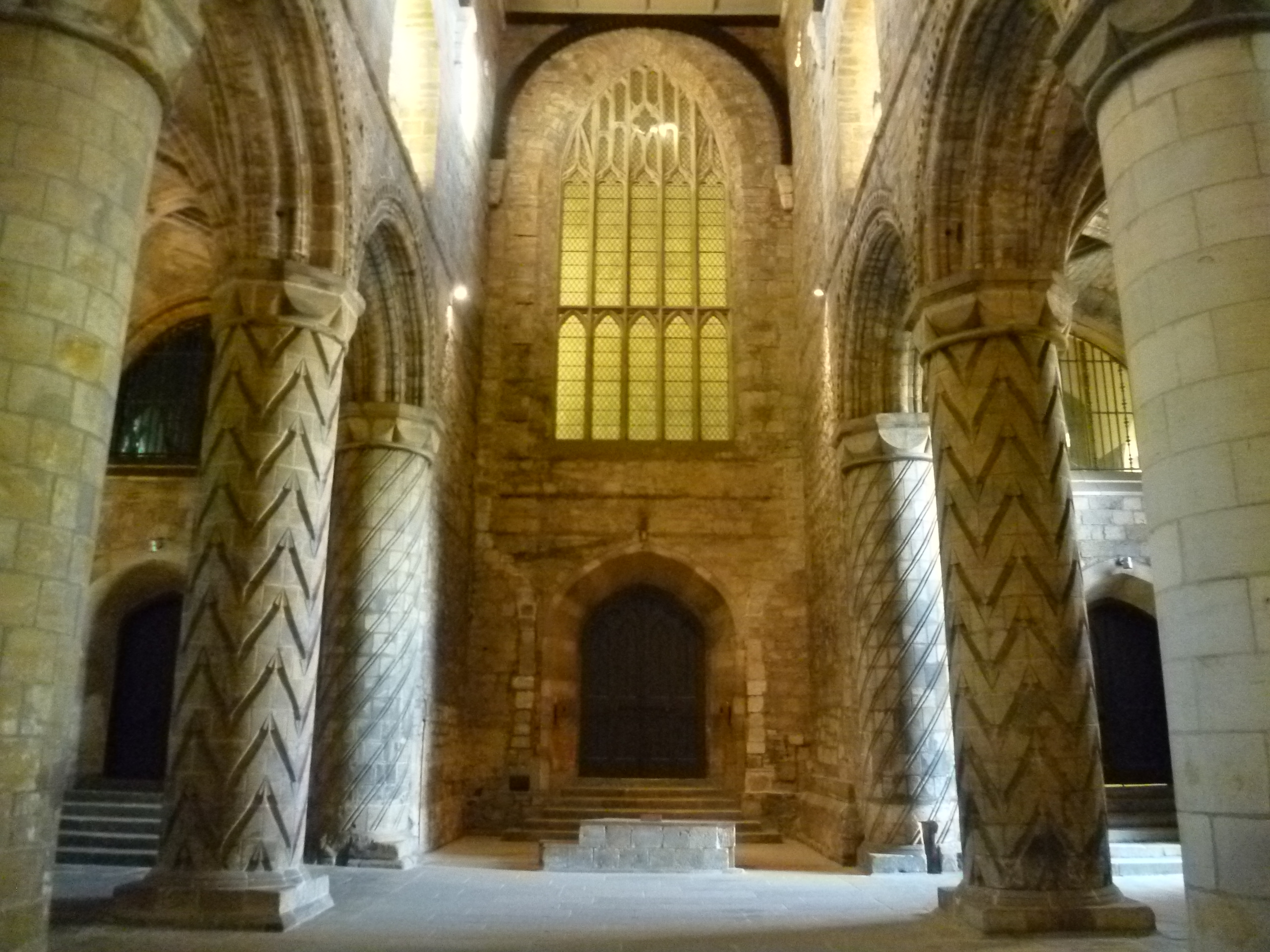
Nave from the reign of King David I

The Benedictine Abbey of the Holy Trinity and St Margaret was founded in 1128 by King David I of Scotland, but the monastic establishment was based on an earlier priory dating back to the reign of his father Malcolm III of Scotland, "Malcolm Canmore" (Máel Coluim mac Donnchada; reigned 1058–93), and his queen, St Margaret. At its head was the Abbot of Dunfermline. The first of these was Geoffrey of Canterbury, former Prior of Christ Church, Canterbury, the Kent monastery that probably supplied Dunfermline's first monks. At the peak of its power it controlled four burghs, three courts of regality, and a large portfolio of lands from Moray in the north to Berwickshire in the south.

In the decades after its foundation the abbey received considerable endowments, as seen from the dedication of 26 altars donated by individual benefactors and guilds where private masses for those benefactors would have been said. Between 1131 and 1145, David I granted land at Penick near Auldearn in Nairnshire to the abbey, including grazing rights in its woodland and open ground, but reserved hunting rights to himself. Charters granted every seventh seal taken on the shore of the royal estate at Kinghorn to the Dunfermline monks, as well as half the oil from whales and large fish caught between the Forth and the Tay for use in altar lamps in the abbey church.

The abbey was an important destination for pilgrims because it hosted the reliquary shrine and cult of Saint Margaret, from whom the abbey later claimed foundation, and for which an earlier foundation charter was fabricated. The foundations of the earliest church, namely the Church of the Holy Trinity, are under the Romanesque nave built in the 12th century.

During the winter of 1303 the court of Edward I of England was held in the abbey, and on his departure the following year most of the buildings were burned.

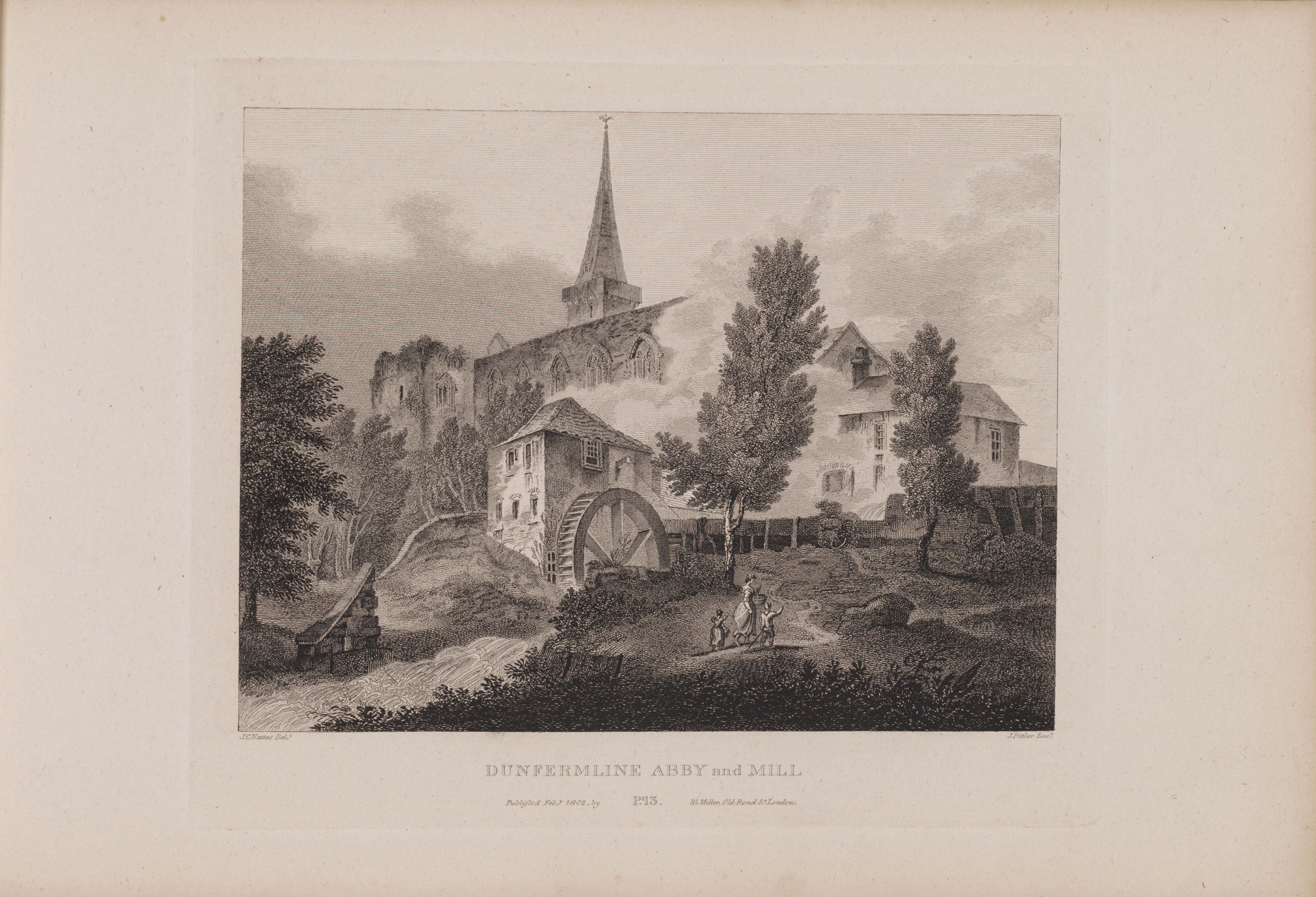
Engraving of Dunfermline Abbey and Mill by James Fittler in Scotia Depicta

=== Later history ===
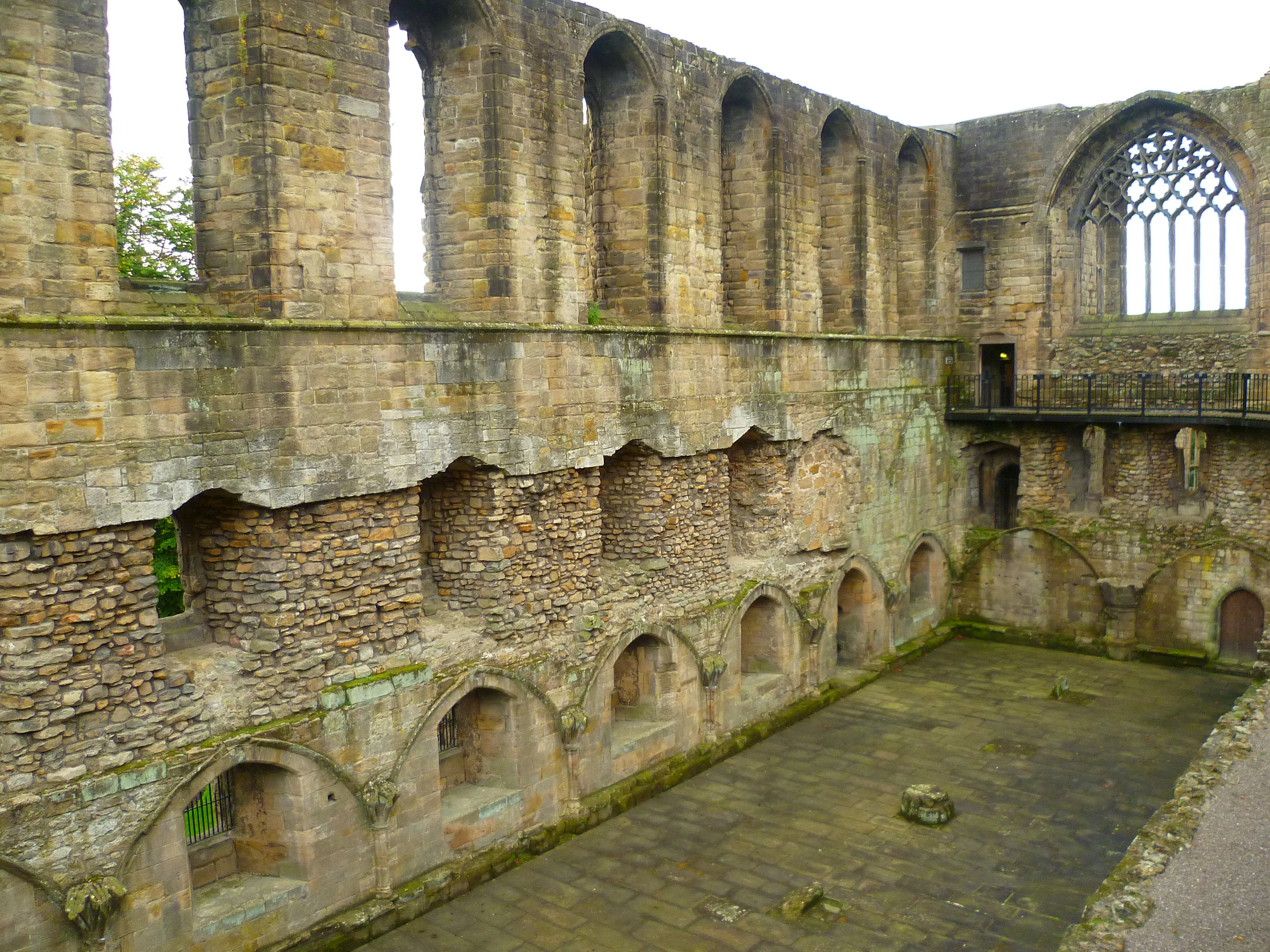
Ruined Refectory

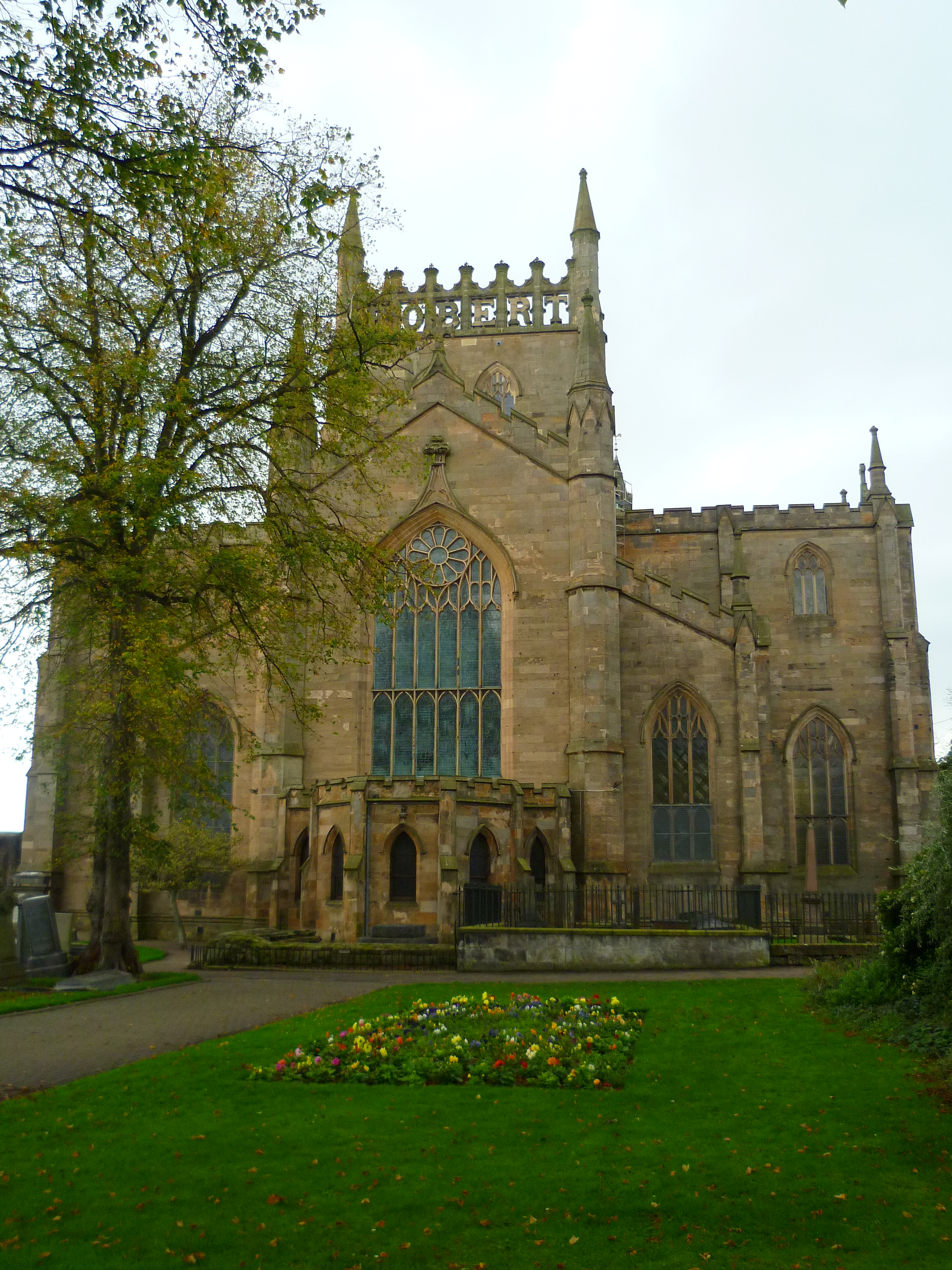
Dunfermline Parish Church

During the Scottish Reformation, the abbey church had undergone a first Protestant 'cleansing' by September 1559, and was sacked in March 1560. By September 1563 the choir and feretory chapel were roofless, and it was said that the nave was also in a sorry state, with the walls so extensively damaged that it was a danger to enter. Some parts of the abbey infrastructure still remain, principally the vast refectory and rooms over the gatehouse which was part of the former city wall. The nave was also spared, and it was repaired in 1570 by Robert Drummond of Carnock. In 1672 parts of the east end collapsed, while in 1716 part of the central tower is said to have fallen, presumably destabilising much that still stood around its base, and the east gable tumbled in 1726. The central tower finally collapsed in 1753.

The nave served as the parish church until the 19th century, and now forms the vestibule of a new church. This edifice, in the Perpendicular style, opened for public worship in 1821. It occupies the site of the ancient chancel and transepts, though differing in style and proportions from the original structure. Of the monastery, there also still remains the south wall of the refectory, with a fine window. Next to the abbey is the ruin of Dunfermline Palace, also part of the original abbey complex and connected to it via the gatehouse.

Dunfermline Abbey, one of Scotland's most important cultural sites, has (after Iona) received more of Scotland's royal dead than any other place in the kingdom. One of the most notable non-royal names associated with the abbey is the Northern Renaissance poet, Robert Henryson. The tomb of Saint Margaret and Malcolm Canmore, within the ruined walls of the Lady chapel, was restored and enclosed by command of Queen Victoria.

=== Today ===
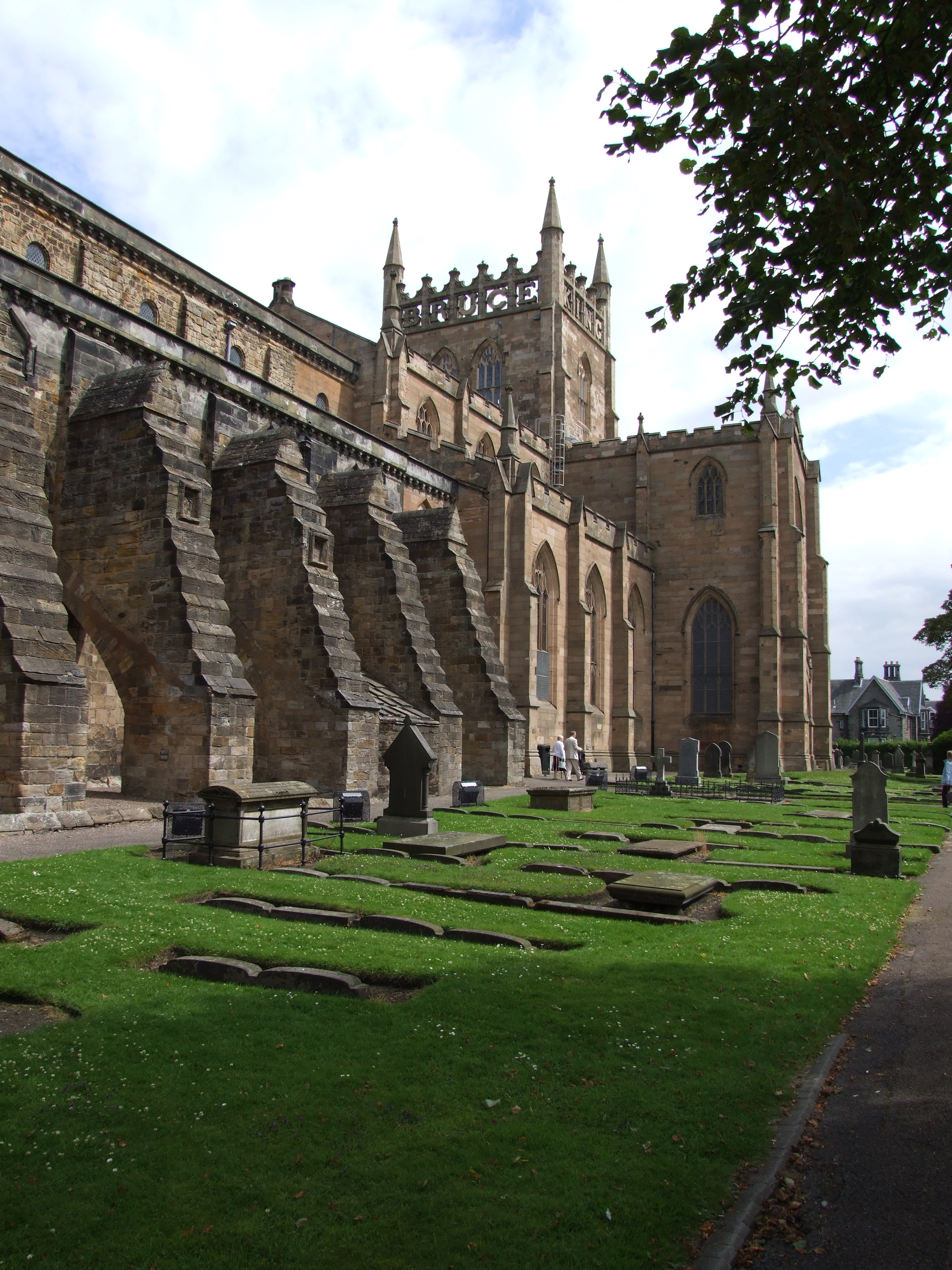
Dunfermline Abbey side view

The current building on the site of the choir of the old abbey church is a parish church of the Church of Scotland, still with the name Dunfermline Abbey. The minister (since 2012) is the Reverend MaryAnn R. Rennie.

In August 2026 the General Trustees of the Church of Scotland requested that Historic Environment Scotland consider taking the Abbey into state care.

== Architecture ==
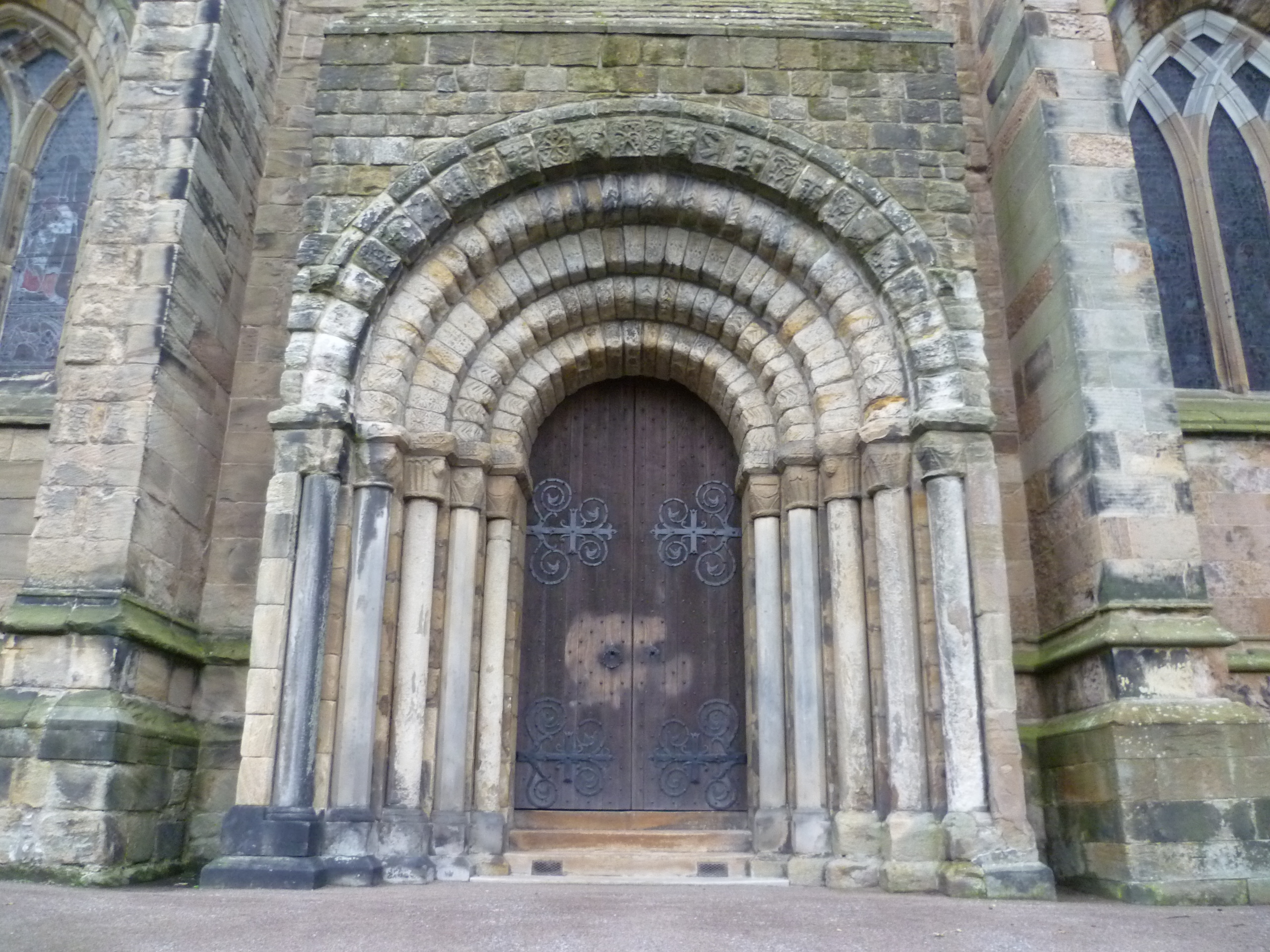
West Door of the abbey

The old building was a fine example of simple and massive Romanesque, as the nave testifies, and has a beautiful doorway in its west front. Alexander I had the two towers built which flanked the great western entrance.

Another rich Romanesque doorway was exposed in the south wall in 1903, when masons were cutting a site for the memorial to the soldiers who had fallen in the Second Boer War. A new site was found for this monument in order that the ancient and beautiful entrance might be preserved. The venerable structure is maintained publicly, and private munificence has provided several stained-glass windows. The architecture of the Afghan Church in Mumbai in India (dedicated to St John the Baptist) references the door and the right side of the church of Dunfermline Abbey.

== Notable ceremonies and burials ==
- Saint Margaret of Scotland was buried here in 1093; on 19 June 1250 following her canonisation her remains were disinterred and placed in a reliquary at the high altar. Her husband Malcolm III's remains were also disinterred, and buried next to Margaret.
- Duncan II of Scotland, 1094
- Edgar of Scotland was buried here in 1107
- Both Alexander I of Scotland (1124) and his queen Sybilla de Normandy (1122) were buried here.
- David I of Scotland was buried here (1153) along with his queen Maud, Countess of Huntingdon (1130)
- Malcolm IV of Scotland was buried here in 1165
- Gille Brigte, Earl of Angus (buried here)
- Adam, Earl of Angus (buried here)
- Gille Críst, Earl of Angus (buried here)
- Donnchadh, Earl of Angus (buried here)
- Alexander III of Scotland (1286) was buried here, with his first wife Margaret of England (1275) and their sons David of Scotland (1281) and Alexander of Scotland (1284)
- Elizabeth de Burgh, wife of Robert I of Scotland, was buried here in 1327

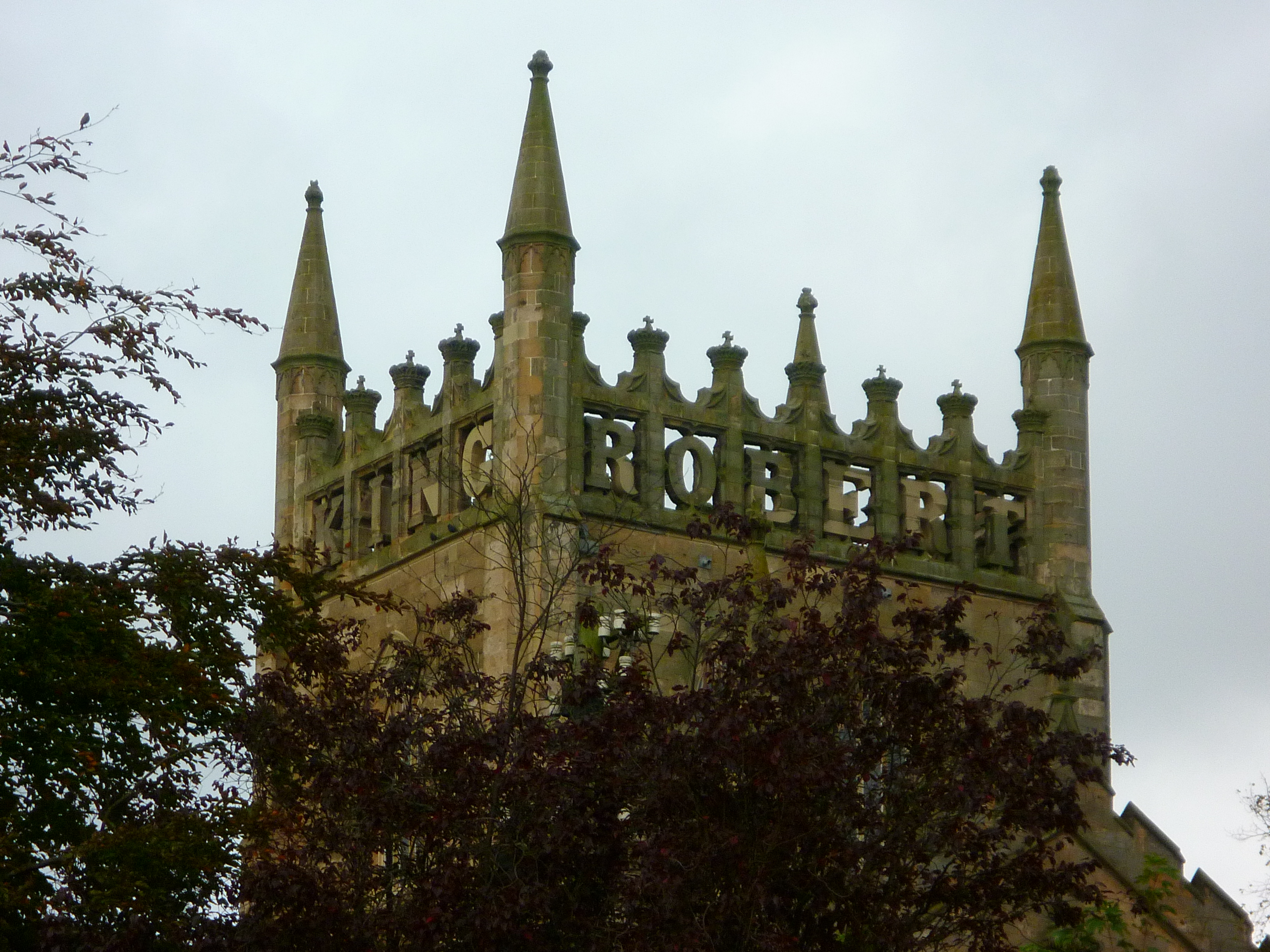
Tower sculpture

- Robert the Bruce was buried, in 1329, in the choir, now the site of the present parish church. Bruce's heart rests in Melrose, but his bones lie in Dunfermline Abbey, where (after the discovery of the skeleton in 1818) they were reinterred with fitting pomp below the pulpit of the New church. In 1891, the pulpit was moved back and a monumental brass inserted in the floor to indicate the royal vault.
- Matilda of Scotland, daughter of Robert I of Scotland, was buried here in 1353
- Anabella Drummond, wife of Robert III and mother of James I was buried here in 1401
- Robert Stewart, Duke of Albany was buried here in 1420
- Bishop James Bruce, buried in 1447
- George Durie (d,1577) memorial in north aisle
- Robert Pitcairn (commendator) (d.1584) memorial in north aisle
- Birthplace, in 1600, of Charles I, the last British monarch born in Scotland.
- William Schaw, Master of Work to the Crown of Scotland, was buried here in 1602: his tomb can still be seen.
- David Lindsay, 1st Lord Balcarres, son of John Lindsay of Balcarres, Lord Menmuir and father of Alexander Lindsay, 1st Earl of Balcarres, was married here in 1611

== Other burials ==
In the Elgin Vault, under the South transept:

- Charles Bruce, 5th Earl of Elgin
- William Robert Bruce, 6th Earl of Elgin and 10th Earl of Kincardine (1764–1771)
- George Charles Constantine Bruce, Lord Bruce (5 April 1800 – 1840)
- Sir Frederick William Adolphus Bruce, died 1867
- Major General Robert Bruce, died 1862

== Dramatic productions ==
Robert Kemp's pageant play The Saxon Saint, about the arrival of Princess Margaret in Scotland in 1068, was staged as an Edinburgh International Festival production in the nave of the abbey in 1949.

Elsewhere:

- Margaret Wake, 3rd Baroness Wake of Liddell

== See also ==
- Abbot of Dunfermline
- Abbeys and priories in Scotland
- List of Church of Scotland parishes
- List of places in Fife
- Robert Henryson
- Scheduled monuments in Fife

== Sources ==
- Blair, David Oswald Hunter (1909). "Abbey of Dunfermline" . In Herbermann, Charles (ed.). Catholic Encyclopedia. Vol. 5. New York: Robert Appleton Company.
