= Geoffrey of Canterbury =

Anglo-Norman monk and Abbott (d. 1154)

Geoffrey
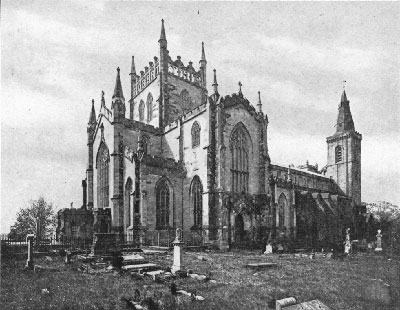
- Dunfermline Abbey, as it stood c. 1919
- Born: Probably mid-to-late 11th century Unknown
- Died: 9 June 1154; Dunfermline (probable)
- Other names: Galfridus
- Occupation: Abbot
- Title: Abbot of Dunfermline

Geoffrey (died 1154) was a 12th-century Anglo-Norman Benedictine monk and abbot. Of Anglo-Norman origin, he became monastic head of the Benedictine priory at Canterbury, before moving to Scotland to be the first Abbot of Dunfermline. As abbot he presided over the construction of the new monastery building, the immigration of English monks and settlers, and the accumulation of enough wealth to make Dunfermline Abbey the richest Benedictine monastic house in the Kingdom of Scotland.

== Canterbury ==
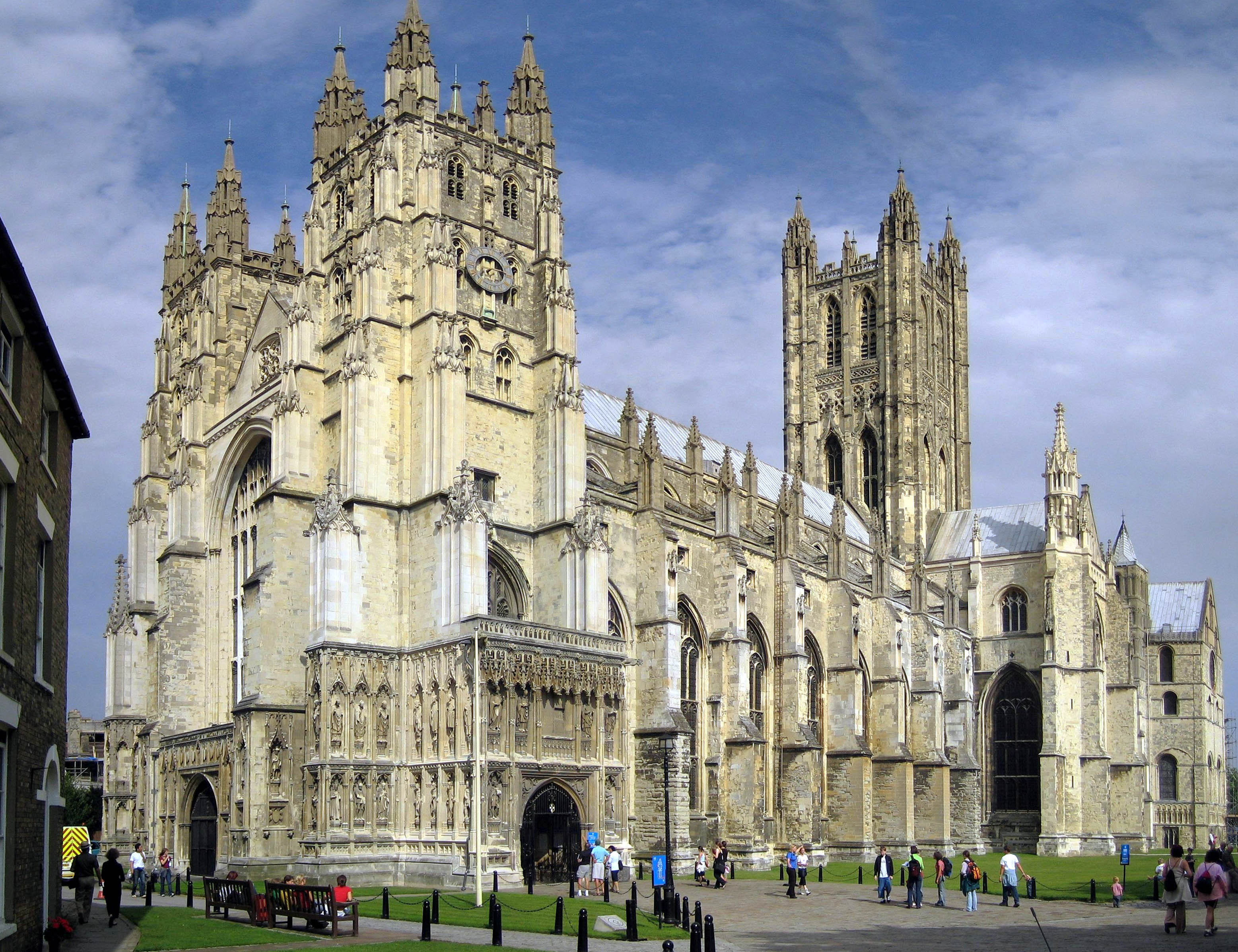
Canterbury Cathedral today.

He rose to prominence in the 1120s, becoming Prior of Christ Church Cathedral Priory sometime after the death of Prior Conrad on 17 February 1127. He held this position for little more than a year, until in 1128 he was invited to become the first Abbot of Dunfermline, with the monastery of Dunfermline recently being promoted from a priory to an abbey, being refounded with thirteen monks from Canterbury.

== Canterbury and Dunfermline ==
Dunfermline was a daughter-house of Christ Church, while that Benedictine priory held significant influence in the Kingdom of Scotland. Such influence had been established by Lanfranc, Archbishop of Canterbury, in the reign of King Máel Coluim mac Donnchada (1058–1093) via the latter's consort, the English princess Margaret of Wessex. During the reign of King Alaxandair mac Maíl Choluim (1107–1124), there was an unsuccessful attempt to make Eadmer, one of Christ Church's monks, Bishop of St Andrews. Now in the reign of King David I (1124–1153), the Scottish monarchy was expanding the monastery at Dunfermline, and Geoffrey came to Scotland as part of royal plans to expand the size and promote the status of the house. Geoffrey was personally invited by the King of Scotland, who also sought and obtained the agreement of William de Corbeil, the archbishop.

== First Abbot of Dunfermline ==
After receiving a blessing by Robert, Bishop of St Andrews, Geoffrey began his career as Dunfermline's abbot. During his abbacy, Geoffrey witnessed a great number of royal charters and King David persistently treated him with more respect that any other abbot — he was usually the first abbot to be named in any witness list. Despite initial problem with Causantín, the local mormaer, Geoffrey's abbacy was generally one of successful expansion of property in which numbers of English immigrants arrived to settle in and around the town of Dunfermline. During his abbacy the abbey was transformed from a small church establishment into a large Romanesque monastery, finally dedicated in 1150.

After this event in 1150, the abbot is not heard of again until the report of his death. The Chronicle of Holyrood recorded his death for the year 1154:

Geoffrey, the abbot of Dunfermline died; and his nephew Geoffrey succeeded in his place.

His death was reported for 9 June 1154. Abbot Geoffrey was buried in the abbey.

== Notes ==
Religious titles
Preceded by Conrad	Prior of Canterbury (Christ Church); 1127 x 1128–1128	Succeeded by Elmer
Preceded by New position Last known prior: Peter (fl. 1120)	Abbot of Dunfermline; 1128–1154	Succeeded by Geoffrey II
