= Robert Pitcairn (commendator) =

16th-century Scottish administrator, diplomat and judge

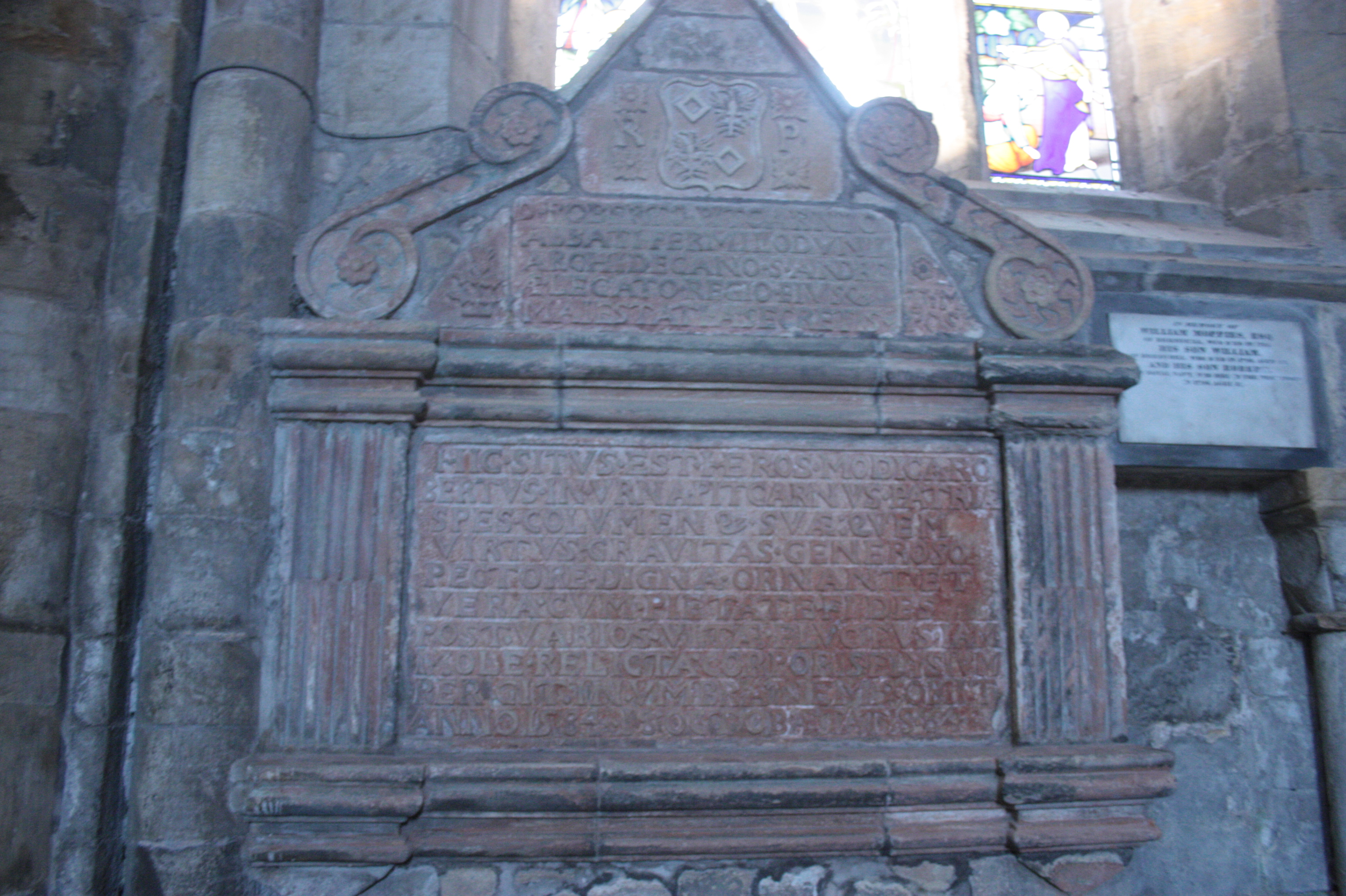
The grave of Robert Pitcairn, Dunfermline Abbey

Robert Pitcairn (1520?–1584) was a Scottish administrator, diplomat and judge, secretary of state and commendator of Dunfermline.

== Early life ==
Born about 1520, he was the son of David Pitcairn, of Forthar-Ramsay in the barony of Airdrie, Fife, and his wife Elizabeth Dury or Durie. On 22 January 1552 his father sold to him the lands of Forthar. He was a cousin of George Durie, Abbot of Dunfermline.

He was educated for the church, and became Archdeacon of St Andrews Cathedral, and commendator of Dunfermline Abbey.

== In politics and diplomacy ==
Pitcairn was summoned on 19 July 1565 to a meeting of the Privy Council as an extraordinary member, to consider a declaration of the Earl of Moray on a conspiracy against his life, at Perth. On 19 October of the same year he was appointed keeper of the havens of Limekilns and North Queensferry. After the surrender of Mary Queen of Scots at Carberry Hill on 15 June 1567, he was chosen a lord of the articles; and on 29 July he was present at the coronation of the young king James VI, in the kirk of Stirling. On 2 June 1568 he was appointed an extraordinary lord of session; and in September of the same year was chosen one of the principal commissioners to accompany the Regent Moray to the conference with the English commissioners at York on the charges against Queen Mary. He was present in the same capacity at Westminster and Hampton Court.

At the Perth convention, in July 1569, Pitcairn voted against the queen's divorce from James Hepburn, 4th Earl of Bothwell; and in September he was sent to London to acquaint Elizabeth I of England with the various negotiations connected with Mary's proposed marriage to Thomas Howard, 4th Duke of Norfolk. Some time after the assassination of the Regent Moray he was, in May 1570, again sent ambassador to Elizabeth, to ask for help in repressing of the internal Scottish troubles, but with little success.

On Pitcairn's return to Scotland Matthew Stewart, 4th Earl of Lennox was made regent: this choice caused William Maitland of Lethington finally to sever himself from the king's party, and Pitcairn was chosen to succeed him as Secretary of State. In November 1570 he was again sent on an embassy to England; and he was also chosen to accompany James Douglas, 4th Earl of Morton on an embassy, the following February, to oppose proposals that had been made for Mary's restoration to her throne. Along with Morton, he was also sent, in November 1571, to treat with Henry Carey, 1st Baron Hunsdon and other English commissioners at Berwick-on-Tweed for an offensive and defensive league with England, the chief purpose being to obtain aid from Elizabeth against the party of Queen Mary in Edinburgh Castle. These negotiations were successful.

Pitcairn now had the confidence of Morton, and he was entrusted by him with negotiations with the English ambassador Henry Killigrew, on the proposal for delivering Mary to the Scottish government for her execution. He was also busy on negotiations with the defenders of Edinburgh Castle, and was one of the commissioners for the pacification, with Huntly and the Hamiltons, at Perth in February 1573.

== On the council ==
Despite his association with Morton, Pitcairn was a party to the conspiracy against him in 1578; and he was one of the new council of twelve chosen after Morton's fall to govern in the name of the king. On 27 June he was chosen as ambassador to Queen Elizabeth I to confirm and renew the league between the realms. His audience with Elizabeth on 25 July 1578 was followed by a meeting with the Privy Council of England at Ralph Sadler's house, now Sutton House in Hackney. Then he went to Ware and the next day followed the court to Audley End House, and was lodged at Saffron Walden. He was called to the queen on 28 July, and discussed the properties of the Countess of Lennox in England, the inheritance of James VI.

Along with other leading figures of the realm, he signed the second confession of faith, called the "king's confession" or "negative confession", at Edinburgh, 28 January 1581. He was one of a commission appointed on 15 July following to hear the suit of Sir James Balfour.

Although an opponent of Morton, Pitcairn's views were of the Protestant party, and he had a major part in setting up the raid of Ruthven— the kidnapping of King James VI— on 23 August 1582, thwarting Lennox and Arran. On 11 January 1583 the keepers of the great seal were ordered, to append the great seal to the gift of the abbacy of Dunfermline to Henry Pitcairn, his nephew, reserving the life-rent to the commendator. On 26 April Pitcairn was appointed assessor to the treasurer, William Ruthven, 1st Earl of Gowrie.

The effect of the Ruthven raid was reversed at St Andrews Castle, on 27 June 1583 after King James escaped prison, against Pitcairn's wishes. Attempts to bolster his position by bribery led to his arrest by William Stewart on the road to Falkland Palace.He was sent into ward in Lochleven Castle. On 23 September he was set at liberty on caution to remain in or near Dunfermline.

== Death ==
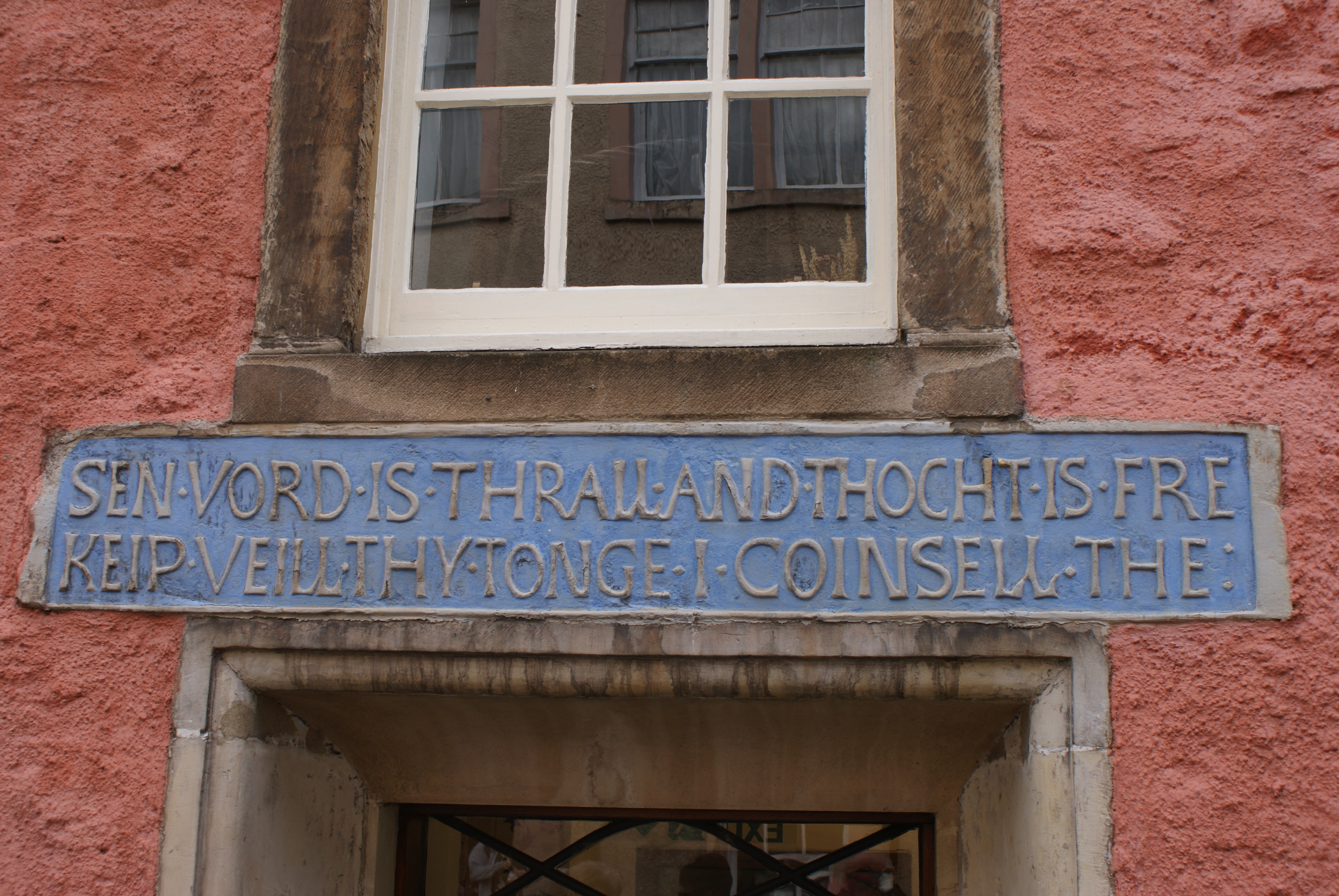
Pitcairn is supposed to have been the author of this inscription on the abbot's house, Dunfermline on the south side of Maygate Street, the tag "Sen vord is thrall and thocht is free,/Keep veill thye tonge, I counsel the".

During the winter of 1583/4 Pitcairn set sail to Flanders. He returned to Scotland in weak health on 12 September 1584, and obtained license to remain in Limekilns, near Dunfermline.

He died on 18 October in his 64th year. He was buried in the north aisle of Dunfermline Abbey, where he was commemorated in a Latin epitaph as the "hope and pillar of his country". After the extrusion of the Master of Gray from the abbacy in 1587, Henry Pitcairn his nephew entered into possession of it.

== Notes ==
Attribution

This article incorporates text from a publication now in the public domain: Lee, Sidney, ed. (1896). "Pitcairn, Robert (1520?-1584)". Dictionary of National Biography. Vol. 45. London: Smith, Elder & Co.
