= Raymond Durie of Durie =

British Army officer (1905–1999)

Raymond Durie of Durie (10 August 1905 – 29 March 1999), until 1988 known as Raymond Dewar-Durie, was a British army officer involved in the Yangtze incident who later became chief of the Clan Durie.

== Career ==
Raymond Dewar-Durie was born in Persia, where his father was the manager of the Imperial Bank of Persia. He was sent to school in England from aged five and later attended Blundell's School in Tiverton and the RMA Sandhurst before being commissioned into the Argyll and Sutherland Highlanders in 1925.

Dewar-Durie had an interesting war, including an escape from Shanghai across Japanese held territory, taking 51 days to reach unoccupied China. He returned to China in 1949 as Assistant Military Attache to the British Embassy in Nanking and played a vital part in the Yangtze incident involving HMS Amethyst

== Clan Durie ==
Although there was never any doubt that Raymond Dewar-Durie was head of the Durie family which had settled in Fife since the 16th century, he did not change his name until 1988, when he followed up the Lord Lyon King of Arms' direction, first made to his father, to claim Chief of the Name and Arms of Durie and became Durie of Durie.

== Sources ==
- Extracted from the obituary of Lt-Col Raymond Durie of Durie, The Independent, 21 April 1999
