= William Melville, Lord Tongland =

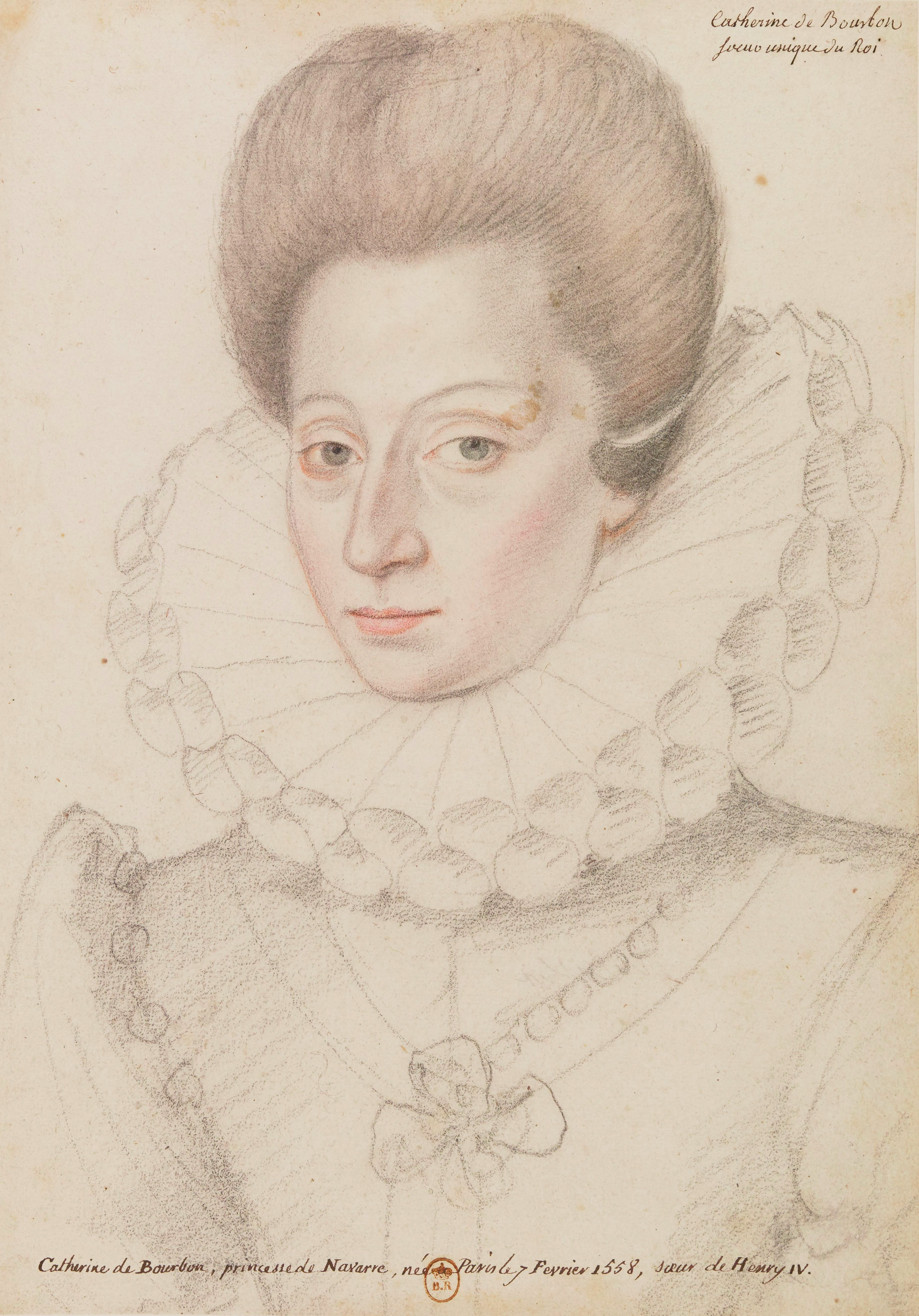
William Melville travelled to Navarre for a portrait of Catherine of Bourbon

William Melville (died 1613) was a Scottish lawyer and diplomat. He was Commendator of Tongland Abbey, and a Lord of Session.

== Career ==
William Melville was a son of John Melville of Raith and Helen Napier. An older brother James Melville of Halhill wrote that William was fluent in Latin, High Dutch, Flemish, and French, and suitable to be a diplomat. In the 1580s he worked for William the Silent and Maurice, Prince of Orange. James Melville enlisted the support of an English diplomat, his "auld friend" Henry Killigrew, to get him better treatment in this employment. William returned to Scotland in 1586.

In July 1587, Guillaume de Salluste Du Bartas came to Falkland to hunt deer and hare with James VI and advance proposals that he would marry Catherine of Bourbon, the sister of Henry of Navarre. In September 1587, the king's marriage was discussed at Falkland. George Douglas was suggested as an ambassador to go to Navarre to discuss the plans. However, James Melville was chosen to travel with Du Bartas because Douglas was not considered "a friend to that alliance". King James rode from Falkland to Halhill to discuss the mission. As James Melville was reluctant, his younger brother William Melville went to Navarre. Expected to return to Scotland in January or February 1588, William Melville brought back Catherine's portrait and "a good report of her rare qualities".

Catherine was not inclined to wed James, and there were political objections to the alliance in Scotland. Instead, James married Anne of Denmark in 1589. In 1594, William Melville was involved in schemes to finance the baptism of Prince Henry by taxation and profits of the royal mint, and he attended the events at Stirling Castle with his brothers James and Andrew as companions to the visiting diplomats.

William Melville died on 3 October 1613. His wife was Anna or Annas Lindsay, the widow of James Murray of Pardewis (died 1592). Pardewis had challenged Bothwell in 1567. Their children were Frederick (died 1614) and Agnes (died 1615).
