= Charles Duryee Traphagen =

American newspaper publisher

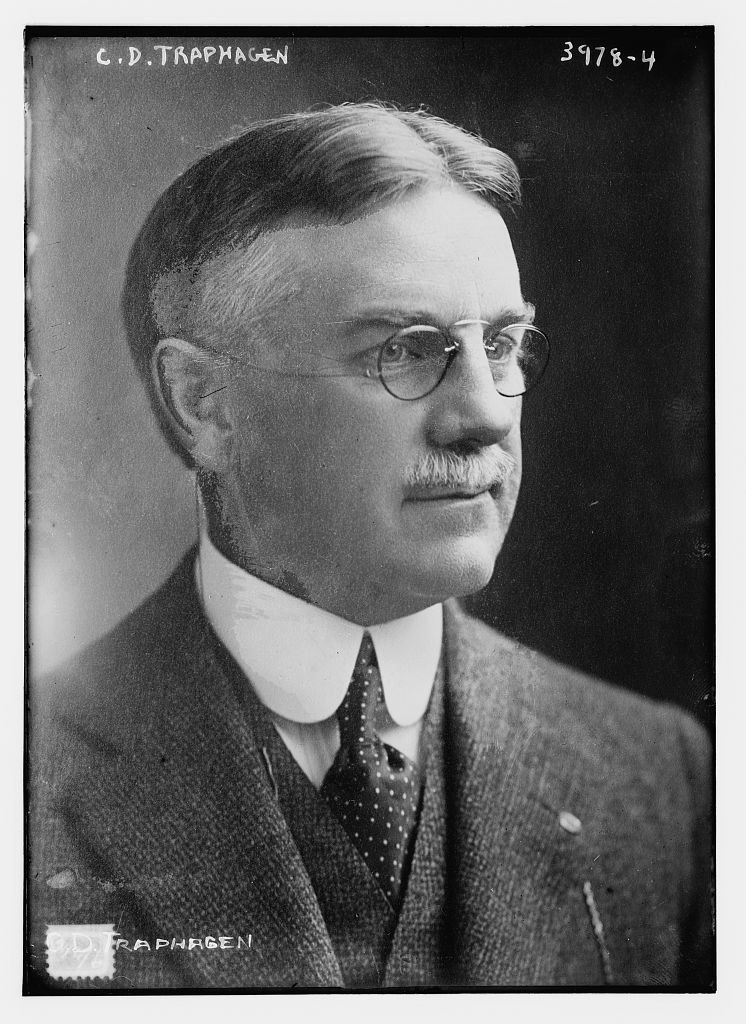
Traphagen circa 1915

Charles Duryee Traphagen (July 13, 1862 – March 25, 1947) was the publisher of the Nebraska State Journal in Lincoln, Nebraska.

== Biography ==
Charles Duryee Traphagen was born in Haverstraw, New York, on July 13, 1862, to Peter P. Traphagen (1818–1862) and Catherine Van Wagenen Duryea (1818–1862). He had a son, Charles Vance Traphagen. He served on the board of the Nebraska State Journal from 1905 to 1907.

He died on March 25, 1947.
