= Dury =

Dury may refer to:

== Places ==
- Dury, Aisne, France
- Dury, Pas-de-Calais, France
- Dury, Somme, France
- Dury, Warmian-Masurian Voivodeship (north Poland)
- Dury, Shetland, a settlement in Nesting, Shetland, Scotland

== People ==
- Baxter Dury (born 1971), British musician
- Graham Dury (born 1962), British cartoonist
- Guy Dury (1895–1976), English cricketer and British Army officer
- Ian Dury (1942–2000), English singer and songwriter
- John Dury (1596–1680), Scottish theologian

== Other ==
- Dury Memorial, commemorating a 1918 battle during the Canada's Hundred Days period

== See also ==
- Durie, a surname
