= George Durie =

Abbot of Dunfermline (died 1577)

- Born: c. 1496; Fife
- Died: 1577; Dunfermline (?)
- Education: University of St Andrews, MA (1531)
- Occupation: Abbot of Dunfermline
- Spouse: Katherine Sibbald (mistress)
- Children: Peter, Henry, George, John, not to be confused with his cousin John, Protestant Minister, or that John's grandson John, protestant divine and Ireneist
- Parent(s): John Durie & Janet née Beaton

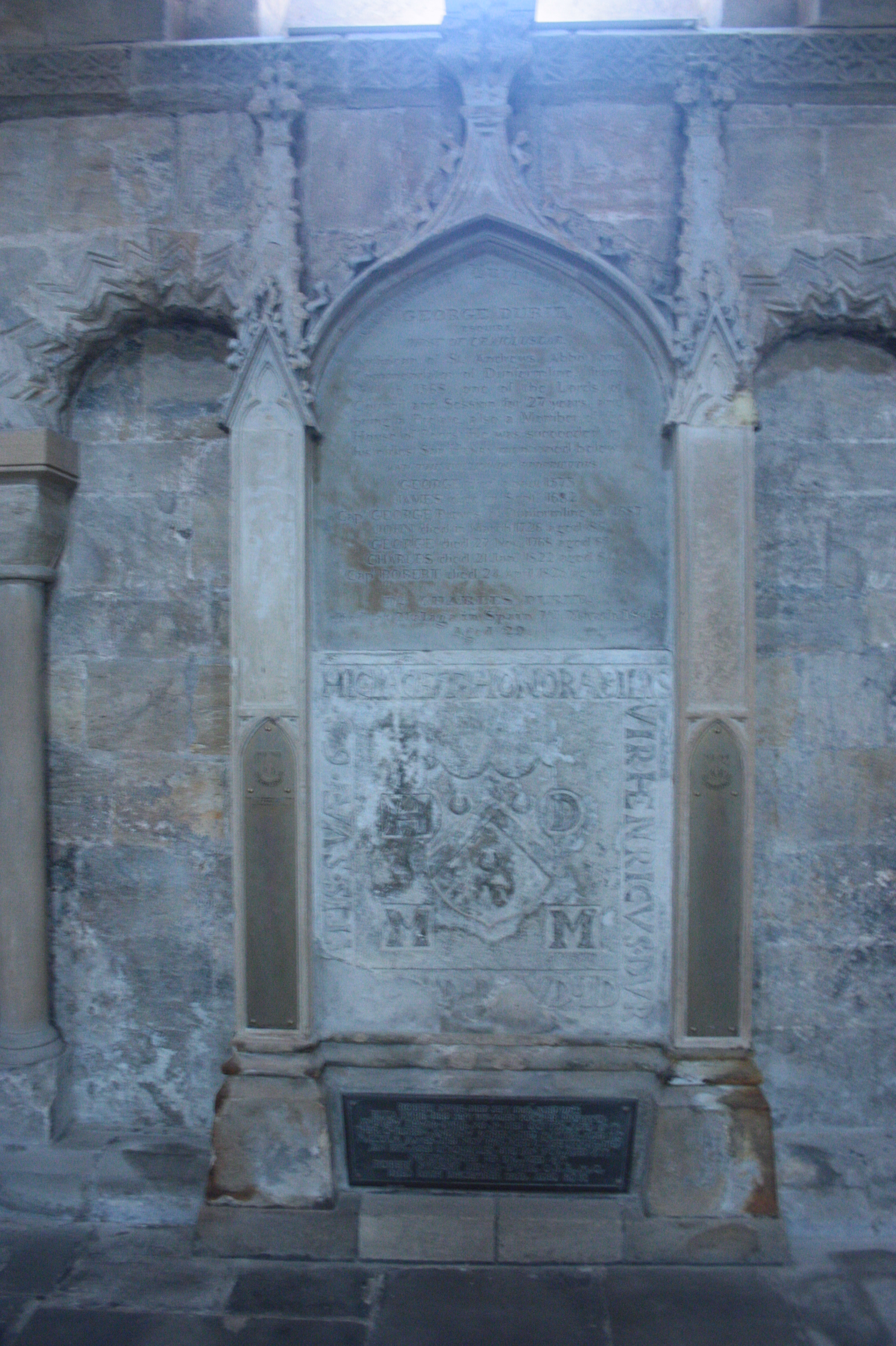
The grave of George Durie, Dunfermline Abbey

George Durie (Dury confused by Watt & Shead with Drury) (died 1577), abbot of Dunfermline and archdeacon of St Andrews, son of John Durie of Durie in the county of Fife, and brother to Andrew Durie, bishop of Galloway, was born about 1496. From 1527 till 1530 he acted as judge and executor of the monastery of Arbroath. During this same period he assumed the title of abbot of Dunfermline, and discharged some of the duties of that office under the direction of his uncle, Archbishop James Beaton, the actual titular, on whose death in 1539 he was promoted by James V to the full dignity of the office.

== Countering protestantism ==
His name appears in the chapter-book of the abbey of Dunfermline so early as 1523, but merely as that of a witness. In the judgment pronounced in 1527 by the ecclesiastical court against Patrick Hamilton, one of the earliest martyrs to reformation principles in Scotland, his name is appended as George, abbot of Dunfermline. He was one of the most zealous abettors in all attempts that were made to combat the new doctrines. He went so far as to bring to trial and to condemn to death for heresy his cousin, John Durie, who was, however, liberated from his power by the Earl of Arran. All the bitter prosecutions that took place in Scotland during this stormy period of history were the result of measures devised by succeeding archbishops of St Andrews and their active and trusted co-adjutor the abbot of Dunfermline.

Cardinal Beaton, in a letter dated 6 July 1545 addressed to Pope Paul III, informs the latter that his prerogative of cardinal had been rudely assailed by the archbishop of Glasgow (Gavin Dunbar), and that he had named Robert Reid, bishop of Orkney, and George, abbot of Dunfermline, to examine witnesses and report to the pope. When the cardinal was murdered (29 May 1546) at St Andrews, and his murderers sustained a siege within the castle, the abbot was very active in trying to avenge the murder. When the siege had lasted six months, he proposed that the besieged should be lured into submission by an offer of obtaining absolution from the pope and of being set at liberty on delivering up the castle.

== Government during the regency ==
The abbot sat in parliaments held in 1540, 1542, 1543, and 1554. During the latter year, in which Mary of Guise assumed the title of queen-regent, he was keeper of the privy seal. He was appointed an extraordinary lord in 1541, and was frequently chosen one of the lords of the articles. He was present at a convention of lords spiritual and temporal held at Stirling, 18 June 1545, in which both the contending factions in the state were represented, when, by mutual concessions, a basis of agreement was formed. The regent Arran was to have a privy council of twenty members, four of whom were to act in rotation for a month. The abbot was appointed to act during the second month of this new arrangement. He was again in office as a privy councillor two years later, in September 1547, at the critical juncture of affairs which led to the Battle of Pinkie.

== Rough Wooing, Regent Mary and Queen Mary ==
Much obloquy has been attached to his name for the part he took in the negotiations prior to the Battle of Pinkie. The members of the privy council deceived the Scottish army as to the conciliatory demands of the English, which they gave out to be insulting. They have been thought to have acted thus, less from patriotic feeling than from religious rancour. A large number of the clergy had been enrolled in the Scottish army, among whom a similar feeling prevailed. William Patten, the English chronicler of the "Expedition into Scotland", and an eye-witness of the battle, gives a very minute description of a banner found on the field after the fight, which was said to be that of the abbot of Dunfermline, and under which the "kirkmen" had fought.

When the popular tide had run so far in Scotland that many of the queen-regent's most influential advisers had deserted her, the abbot showed no sign of defection. When her prospects were the darkest, he approved of her withdrawal to Leith, whither he accompanied her with others of the catholic clergy. The defence was entrusted almost entirely to French troops, to obtain help against whom the Scottish Protestant party applied to England. The Catholics, in their turn, sent the abbot to France to represent to King Francis and Queen Mary how they were situated. Although then sixty-seven years of age, he seems to have been quite as resolute as before. He embarked at Dunbar for France on 29 January 1560. In August following the Scottish parliament voted the abolition of the Roman Catholic Church and hierarchy in Scotland, and sent Sir James Sandilands to France to obtain the ratification of this measure by the queen. His untoward reception was attributed in Scotland partly to the influence of Durie, who was then at the French court.

== Mary, Queen of Scots ==
In December Francis II died. Deputations were sent to France by both the Protestant and catholic parties to invite Queen Mary to return. The abbot had the advantage of being with the queen prior to the deaths of her mother and her husband. He was also with her when she went to pay her visits of leave-taking among her relatives in Rheims and Joinville, where she remained six months. Holinshed says: "The queen, being desirous to have peaceful landing in Scotland, would not for the present meddle with religion, although Durie, abbot of Dunfermline, and John Sinclaire, lately appointed bishop of Brechin, did vehemently persuade and labour her to the contrary".

== Death and legacy ==
The abbot left for France shortly afterwards, late January 1561. Nicholas Sanders, in his De Visibili Monarchia Ecclesiæ, chap. viii., has included him in the list he gives of the catholic clergy in Great Britain who had been deprived of their benefices on account of their attachment to their faith. Two years after his death he was beatified by the Roman Catholic Church. Dempster and other writers of the same period call him a saint and a martyr.

He left a numerous family in Scotland. His two elder sons, Peter and Henry, were legitimated by an act passed under the great seal, dated 30 September 1543. They appear to have acted as guardians to two younger ones, George and John, who were sent when young to the Scots college at Paris, and subsequently to the Catholic University of Leuven. Several of their letters, dated from Leuven 1571, addressed to their brothers in Scotland, have been preserved in state papers relating to Scotland in the Record Office. John Durie became a Jesuit.

He died in October 1577, by which time he was suffering from senility.

He is buried in the north aisle of Dunfermline Abbey.

Religious titles
Preceded by John Cantuly	Archdeacon of St Andrews; 1526–1559	Succeeded by Robert Pitcairn
Preceded by James Beaton	Abbot of Dunfermline; 1526/39–1579	Succeeded by Robert Pitcairn
