= Abbot of Dunfermline =

Head of the community of Dunfermline Abbey

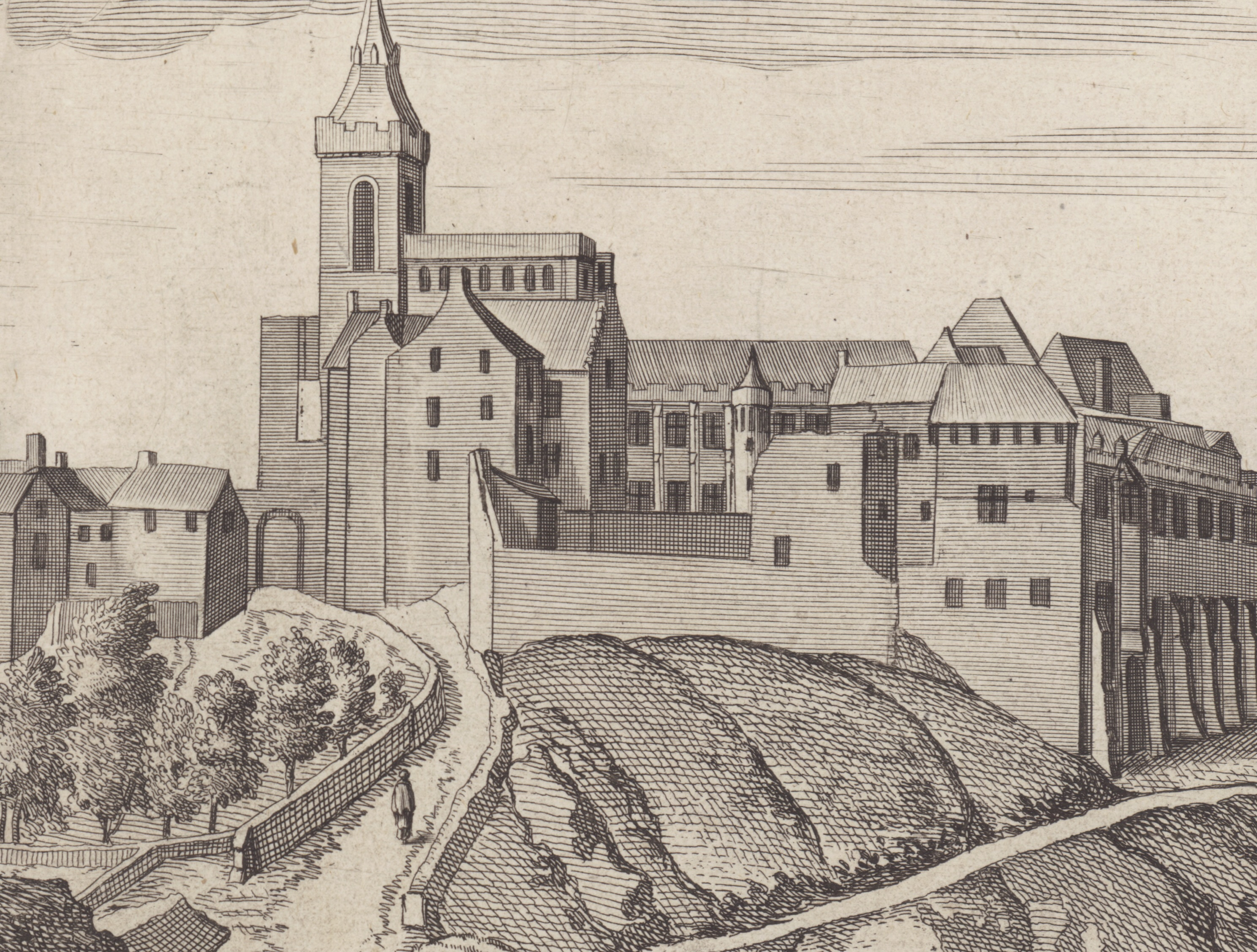
Dunfermline Abbey drawn by John Slezer c.1690

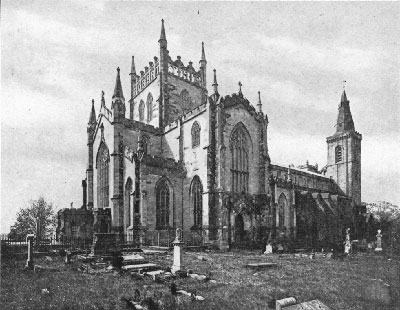
Dunfermline Abbey, circa 1919

The Prior, then Abbot and then Commendator of Dunfermline was the head of the Benedictine monastic community of Dunfermline Abbey, Fife, Scotland. The abbey itself was founded in 1128 by King David I of Scotland, but was of earlier origin. King Máel Coluim mac Donnchada ("Malcolm III") had founded a church there with the help of Benedictines from Canterbury. Monks had been sent there in the reign of Étgar mac Maíl Choluim (Edgar, 1097–1107) and Anselm had sent a letter requesting that Étgar's brother and successor King Alaxandair mac Maíl Coluim (Alexander I, 1107–1124) protect these monks. By 1120, when Alaxandair sent a delegation to Canterbury to secure Eadmer for the bishopric of St Andrews, there is a Prior of the Dunfermline monks by the name of Peter leading the delegation. Control of the abbey was secularized in the 16th century and after the accession of James Stewart in 1500, the abbey was held by commendators. In the second half of the 16th century, the abbey's lands were being carved up into lordships and it was finally annexed to the crown in July, 1593.

== List of Priors ==
- Peter, 1120
- Richard Mongal, 1133-1148

== List of Abbots ==
- Geoffrey I, 1148–1154
- Geoffrey II, 1154–1178
- Archibald, 1178–1198
- Robert de Berwick, 1198–1202
- Patrick, 1202–1217x1223
- William I, 1223
- William II, 1223 x 1226–1238
- Geoffrey III, 1238–1240
- Robert de Keldeleth, 1240–1252
- John, 1252–1256
- Matthew, 1256
- Simon, 1267–1275
- Radulf de Greenlaw, 1275–1296
- Hugh, 1304x1306-1313
- Robert de Crail, 1314–1328
- Alexander Ber, c. 1328-9-1350 x 1351
- John Black, 1351
- John de Stramiglot, 1351–1383x1388
- William de Angus, 1383
- John de Torry, 1388–1409
- William de St Andrews (Anderston), 1413–1426
- Robert de Scotland, 1418–1419
- William Brown, 1427
- Andrew de Kirkcaldy, 1427–1444
- Richard de Bothwell, 1444–1468
- Alexander Thomson, c. 1470
- Henry Crichton, 1471–1482
- Adam Cant, 1483–1490
- George Crichton, 1490–1500
  - Opposed by Raphael Riario, 1491–1492
  - Opposed by Robert Swinton, 1492
  - Opposed by Thomas Cranston, 1492
  - Opposed by Andrew Pictoris, 1492

== List of Commendators ==
- James Stewart, 1500–1504
- Gilbert Strachan, 1504
- James Beaton, 1504–1509
- Alexander Stewart, 1509–1513
- James Hepburn, 1513–1516
- Peter de Accoltis, 1514
- Andrew Forman, 1514–1521
- James Beaton (again), 1522–1539
- George Durie, 1526/39–1572
- Robert Pitcairn, 1553/72–1584
- Henry Pitcairn, 1582/4–1593
  - Patrick, Master of Gray, 1585–1587
  - George, Earl of Huntly, 1587

== Bibliography ==
- Cowan, Ian B. & Easson, David E., Medieval Religious Houses: Scotland With an Appendix on the Houses in the Isle of Man, Second Edition, (London, 1976), pp. 58–59
- Watt, D.E.R. & Shead, N.F. (eds.), The Heads of Religious Houses in Scotland from the 12th to the 16th Centuries (The Scottish Records Society, New Series, Volume 24), (Edinburgh, 2001), p. 67–73
