= Tongland Abbey =

Abbey in Dumfries and Galloway, Scotland

Coordinates: 54.8637°N 4.0307°W

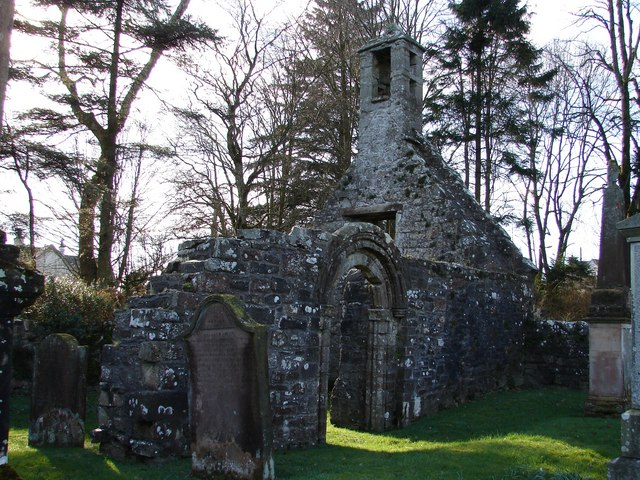
- Interactive map of Tongland Abbey

Monastery information
- Established: 1218
- Mother house: Cockersand Abbey
- Diocese: Diocese of Galloway

People
- Founder: Alan, Lord of Galloway

Site
- Location: Galloway, (Kirkcudbrightshire)

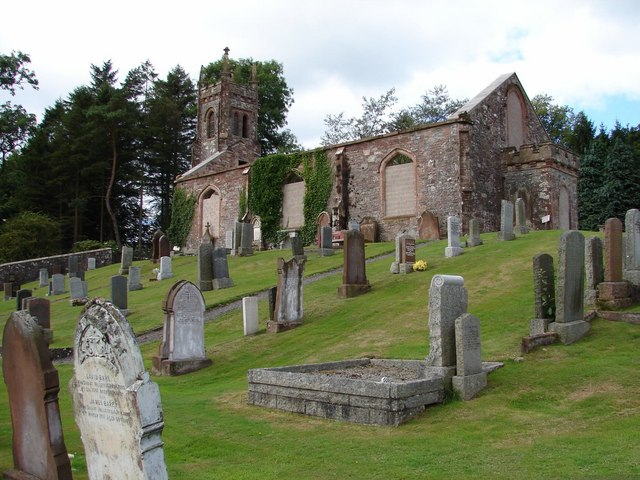
Tongland churchyard contains remains of the older church (1773), and fragments of the 12th century Abbey. Photo by Chris Newman

Tungland or Tongland Abbey was a Premonstratensian monastic community located in Tongland in the historical county of Kirkcudbrightshire in Dumfries and Galloway, Scotland. It was probably founded circa 1218 by Alan, Lord of Galloway, although the church of Tongland had previously been granted to Holyrood Abbey by his grandfather Uchtred in the early 1160s. Few of its early abbots are known and its history is more generally covered by a cloud of obscurity.

One notable abbot (1504-1509) was the Italian alchemist John Damian, (in Italian Giovanni Damiano de Falcucci), who was, if a satirical account in two poems by William Dunbar is based in fact, may have made an attempt at human-powered flight from the walls of Stirling Castle.

The fabric and discipline of the abbey had degenerated by the early sixteenth century. There is no evidence that John Damien ever resided in the abbey and he may have resigned his title in 1509 when King James IV made a petition to Rome for the title to pass to "David bishop of Galloway" with a commission to "reform the discipline and repair the ruins". This petition was repeated under King James V and Tongland was eventually granted to the bishop in 1529, and confirmed in 1541.

Tongland remained a possession of the bishop until the commendatorship of William Melville (1588-1606), but afterwards reverted into the bishop's hands.

The village of Tongland exists now at the site.

== Bibliography ==
- Cowan, Ian B. & Easson, David E., Medieval Religious Houses: Scotland With an Appendix on the Houses in the Isle of Man, Second Edition, (London, 1976), p. 103
- Watt, D.E.R. & Shead, N.F. (eds.), The Heads of Religious Houses in Scotland from the 12th to the 16th Centuries, The Scottish Records Society, New Series, Volume 24, (Edinburgh, 2001), pp. 210–13

== See also ==
- Stewartry Kirks Project. http://stewartrykirks.org.uk/?page_id=82
- http://canmore.rcahms.gov.uk/en/site/64048/details/tongland+abbey/
- Abbot of Tongland, for a list of abbots and commendators
