= Nebraska State Journal =

The Nebraska State Journal (NSJ), also known as Lincoln Nebraska State Journal, was a daily newspaper published from 1867 through 1951. The first newspaper for the city of Lincoln, Nebraska, it was founded by Charles H. Gere and W. W. Carder in 1867 with the name title of the Nebraska Commonwealth. It was first published on September 7, 1867 but did not become a daily publication until three years later by July 20, 1870. Two years after its founding, its name was changed from the Nebraska Commonwealth to the Nebraska State Journal in 1869, and at this time John Q. Brownslee joined Gere as a publisher of the paper. Gere remained editor-in-chief of the NSJ until his death in 1904.

In 1949 the paper was awarded the Pulitzer Prize for Public Service.

In 1951 the paper, now owned by J.C. Seacrest, ceased publication when it was merged with Seacrest's other newspaper, the Lincoln Evening Journal, to form the Lincoln Evening Journal & Nebraska State Journal. That paper remained in existence until 1995 when it merged with the Lincoln Daily Star to form the Lincoln Journal Star.
