= John Damian =

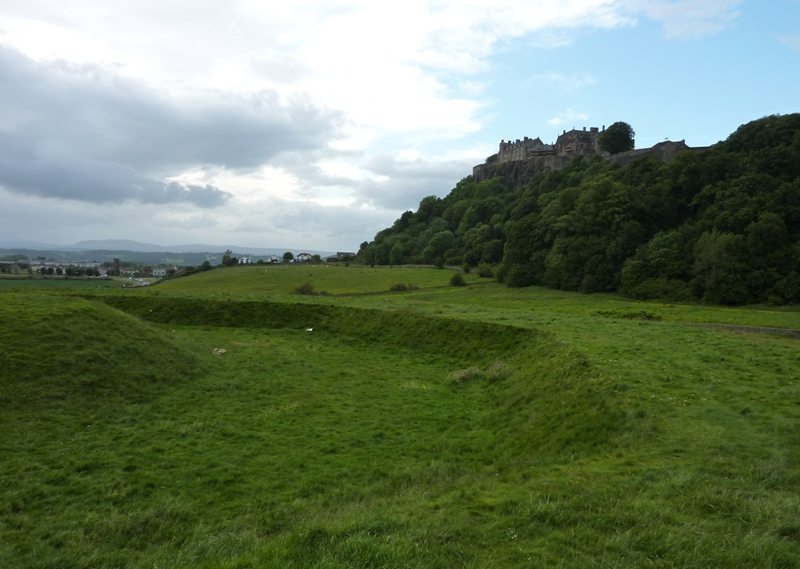
John Damian tried to fly from Stirling Castle

John Damian de Falcuis (Italian: Giovanni Damiano de Falcucci) was an Italian at the court of James IV of Scotland. His attempts at medicine, alchemy, flying, and his advancement by the king encouraged a satirical attack by the poet William Dunbar.

== Exchequer records ==
In the records of the Scottish exchequer John Damian is called the "French Leech" or "Master John the French Leech". "Leech" being an old word for a physician. He first appears in the records in January 1501. He directed the building of alchemical furnaces at Stirling Castle and Holyroodhouse to produce the "quinta essentia", the fifth element. The furnace at Stirling was tended by Caldwell and Alexander Ogilvy, and managed by Andrew Aytoun, Captain of the castle.

In England, Henry VII was also interested in alchemy. He rewarded a "stranger of Perpignan that shewed quinta essentia" in January 1499, and employed a "multiplier" to make gold in the Tower of London.

John Damian was appointed Abbot of Tongland. Between 1501 and 1508 he received a great deal of money from the king and bought many ingredients to make the quintessence, which included aqua vitae, quicksilver, sal ammoniac, alum, litharge, orpiment, saltpetre, silver, sugar, sulphur, tin, verdigris, vinegar and white lead. Some of the materials for the quintessence were supplied by the court apothecary John Mosman, who was involved in building the furnaces. A goldsmith, Matthew Auchinleck, made silver fittings for the distillation equipment.

John took a hand in court entertainments, organizing the dances in Edinburgh at New Year 1504. In 1507, John tried to fly from the battlements of Stirling Castle, but broke his thigh in the process. The records of royal treasurer list sums of money lost by the King playing cards with John and betting at shooting matches with his hand culverin.

John resigned as Abbot of Tongland in 1509, and James IV wrote to Pope Julius II asking that John's pension of 200 gold ducats should be paid. James IV sent John Damian to view the gold workings at Crawfurdmuir in March 1513, and he is still recorded at court a few months before the battle of Flodden in 1513.

== William Dunbar and John Lesley ==
The contemporary poet William Dunbar described Damian's career in comic terms in the poem, "A Ballad of the False Friar of Tongland, How He Fell in the Mire Flying to Turkey". According to Dunbar, Damian came from the east and stole a priest's robes in Lombardy. In France he pretended to be a doctor to the detriment of his patients then came to Scotland where in "leichecraft he was homecyd" (a killer in surgery). When he failed to make the quintessence by alchemy, he decided to fly to Turkey. But he was attacked by birds who plucked his wings and landed up to his eyes in a mire.

Another poem by Dunbar, the Antichrist, first line "Lucina shynning in silence of the nicht", recalls a dream. Dame Fortune came to the poet and described her wheel and the genesis of the flying Abbot. She said Dunbar would not get clerical advancement until he saw a flying Abbot. Dunbar kept this dream to himself. But soon, turning the genre of the ballad of impossibilities on its head, Dunbar did see a flying Abbot.

A later writer, John Lesley, provided a complimentary account. Lesley mentioned the alchemy, and describes how the failure of the enterprise began to make Damian unpopular. To counter this he announced that he would fly from Stirling Castle, reaching France before the Scottish ambassadors. On the appointed day he put on a pair of wings made from feathers and leapt from the highest point of the castle. Lesley says his journey ended as soon as it began, with the bystanders uncertain whether to mourn his demise or marvel at his daftness. Damian had broken his thigh bone and alleged that he had hoped to use only eagle feathers, but some poultry feathers supplied had sabotaged his wings. In Lesley's text the event is placed immediately prior to his account death of Prince James in February 1508. There was a Scottish embassy to France in September 1507, so in the absence of other evidence, the attempt at flying is usually assigned to that date.

The critic Priscilla Bawcutt sees the Ballad and the Antichrist characterising Damian as a shape-shifter without fixed identity. There is no other evidence for the flying attempt apart from Dunbar's poems and Lesley's later account, and the episode of the failed flight has a number of traditional literary parallels as an example of foolish striving for superhuman attainment. The birds who attack the flier in the poem draw attention to his lack of identity; "all fowill ferleit (wondered) quhat he sowld be" as an imposter.

A late 17th century carpenter's bill for work at Stirling Castle refers to a now unknown location, presumably at the King's Old Building built by James IV, where 'the Devil flew out'.

== See also ==
- Franz Reichelt, later parachute pioneer
