= James Beaton =

Scottish church leader

The Most Reverend James Beaton
- Archbishop of St Andrews; Primate of Scotland
- Church: Roman Catholic Church
- Archdiocese: St Andrews
- Appointed: 10 October 1522
- Term ended: 14 February 1539
- Predecessor: Andrew Forman
- Successor: David Beaton
- Previous posts: Archbishop of Glasgow (1509–22); Bishop of Galloway (1508–09)

Orders
- Consecration: 15 April 1509

Personal details
- Born: c. 1473
- Died: 14 February 1539 (aged c. 66) St Andrews, Scotland
- Parents: John Beaton of Balfour

James Beaton (or Bethune) (c. 1473 – 15 February 1539) was a Roman Catholic Scottish church leader, the uncle of David Cardinal Beaton and the Keeper of the Great Seal of Scotland.

== Life ==
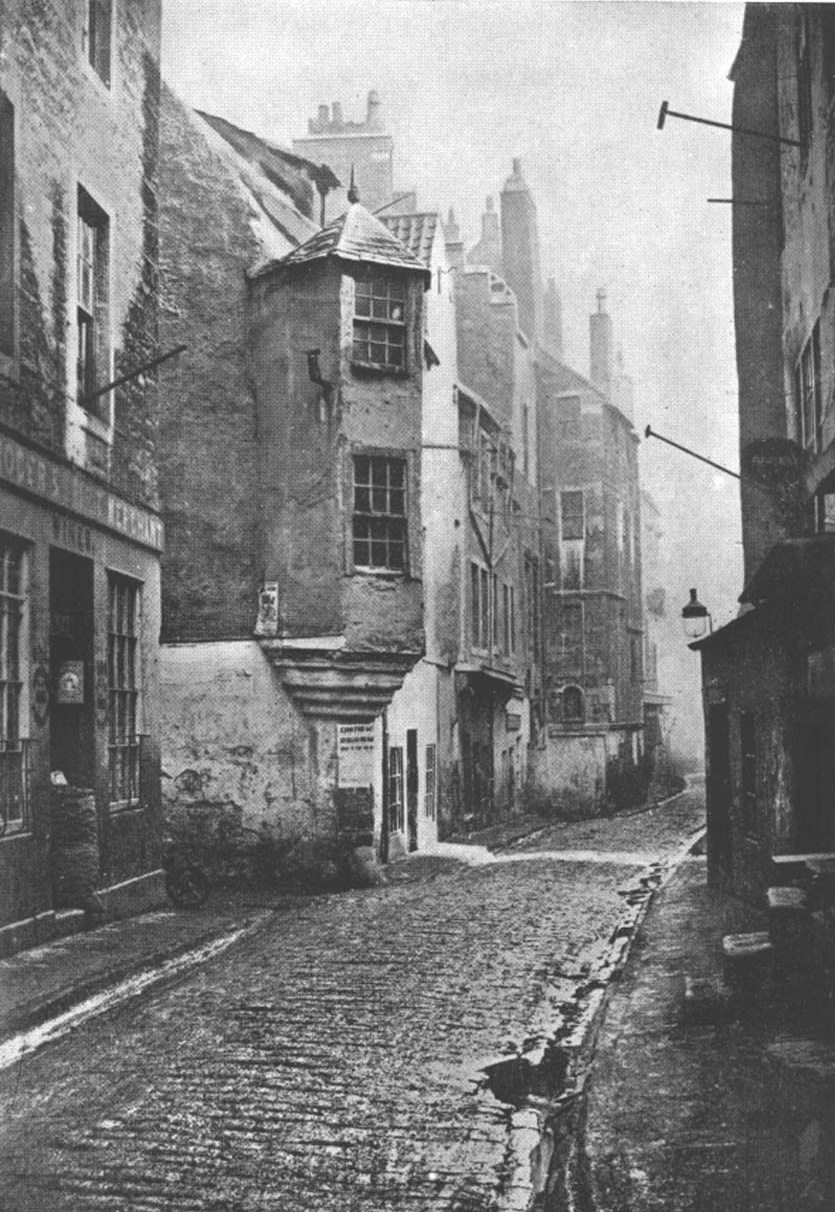
Beaton's lodging in Edinburgh's Cowgate, demolished 1867, later belonged to his nephew David Beaton

James Beaton was the sixth and youngest son of John Beaton of Balfour, in Fife. He graduated as Master of Arts at St. Andrews University in 1493, was appointed Precentor of Dornoch Cathedral (Diocese of Caithness) in 1497 and in 1503 was appointed Provost of the Collegiate Church of Bothwell. In 1504 he became Prior of Whithorn and Abbot of Dunfermline and in 1505 was made Lord High Treasurer of Scotland by James IV.

In 1508 he was elected as Bishop of Galloway, in succession to George Vaus, but before his consecration he was chosen to succeed Robert Blackadder as Archbishop of Glasgow and was consecrated at Stirling on 15 April 1509. With the archbishopric he held the commendatory Abbeys of Arbroath and Kilwinning, and in 1515 he became Lord Chancellor of Scotland. King James V was at this time a child and Beaton, as one of the Council of Regency, was one of the most important people in the kingdom during the minority of the young king.

In 1522 Beaton was transferred to St. Andrews bishopric, vacant by the death of Archbishop Forman. As primate he threw all his powerful influence into the scale against the intrigues of Henry VIII to obtain predominance in Scotland. He was chiefly responsible for the king's action in allying himself with France and not with England. The English ambassador described him as "greatest man both of lands and experience within this realm, and noted to be very crafty and dissimulating".

His residence in the capital, Edinburgh, was at the foot of Blackfriars Wynd on the Cowgate. This had a courtyard form and the coat-of-arms of the Bethune family over the entrance.

In 1528 he ordered Patrick Hamilton burned at the stake for the alleged heresy of Lutheranism. The Regent Albany's jealousy had deprived Beaton of the chancellorship some years previously, and he was never reappointed, though he enjoyed the full favour of the king. A few months after the second marriage of James to Mary of Guise, the primate got his nephew Cardinal Beaton appointed his coadjutor with right of succession. Archbishop James Beaton died in the autumn of 1539 in his castle at St. Andrews. In 1538 he founded St Mary's College at the University of St Andrews.

== Arms ==
Coat of arms of James Beaton
Notes Beaton's arms have been part adapted into those of St Mary's College, St Andrews Escutcheon First and fourth azure, a fess between three mascles or; second and third argent, a chevron sable charged with an otter's head erased of the first.

Catholic Church titles
Preceded by George Vaus	Bishop of Galloway; 1508 not consecrated	Succeeded by David Arnot
Preceded by Robert Blackadder	Archbishop of Glasgow; 1508/9–1522	Succeeded by Gavin Dunbar
Preceded by Andrew Forman	Archbishop of St Andrews; 1522–1539	Succeeded by Cardinal Beaton
Political offices
Preceded by Alexander Stewart; Archbishop of St Andrews	Lord Chancellor of Scotland; 1515–1526	Succeeded by 6th Earl of Angus
Preceded by Samuel Disbrowe	Keeper of the Great Seal of Scotland unknown – unknown	Succeeded by Sir Adam Forrester
Academic offices
Preceded by Andrew Forman; Archbishop of St Andrews	Chancellor of the University of St Andrews; 1522–1539	Succeeded by Cardinal Beaton; Archbishop of St Andrews
