= Thomas de Dundee =

Roman Catholic bishop

- Bishop of Ross
- Church: Roman Catholic Church
- See: Diocese of Ross
- In office: 1293 × 1295–1325
- Predecessor: Robert de Fyvie / Adam de Darlington
- Successor: Roger
- Previous posts: Subdean of Glasgow (1273 × 1293–1293 × 1295); Dean of Brechin (1293 × 1295–1295)

Orders
- Consecration: 18 November 1295 × 2 January 1296

Personal details
- Born: unknown unknown
- Died: 5 January × 17 April 1325

Thomas de Dundee, also called Thomas Nicholay, was a Scottish prelate who held the bishopric of Ross during the First War of Scottish Independence. Coming from a family of Dundee burgesses, he was educated as the University of Bologna, before entering into career in the church.

He obtained benefices in the diocese of Glasgow and the diocese of Brechin, as well as in Ross, and served as the chaplain to a cardinal before being appointed Bishop of Ross by papal provision in 1295. After some delay, he was able to take up his position and held it until his death in early 1325.

== Biography ==
=== Family background ===
Thomas was the son of a burgess of Dundee named Nicholas. Detailed knowledge of Thomas' father is lacking, but one "Nicholas son of Robert" is found as a burgess of Dundee in a Lindores Abbey document dated between 1237 and 1243. Another relevant Nicholas, "Nicholas the Chaplain", is found in 1281 residing in a Dundee tenement located next the tenement of Radulf de Dundee. It is possible both names referred to the same person, but at any rate either could have been Thomas' father.

Another Dundee burgess family in the period produced prominent churchman, the family of Hervey de Dundee, Bishop of Caithness. There is no proof that the two families were kindred, although in the early 1310s Thomas was recorded as assisting Hervey's brother Radulf de Dundee obtain a loan for his daughter's marriage portion.

Thomas' father was prosperous, wealthy enough to send Thomas to the University of Bologna in Italy. Thomas was recorded as Magister ("Master"), i.e. possessing a Master's degree, at Bologna in 1286. He probably studied there alongside the aforementioned Radulf de Dundee, as well as one Michael de Dundee, whose exact family origin cannot be determined.

=== Early career ===
Documents dating to 18 February and 24 April 1293, have Thomas as Subdean of Glasgow Cathedral. On the former date he was at Scone acting as proctor for the cathedral chapter of Glasgow at an arbitration conducted by Robert Wishart, Bishop of Glasgow. Thomas had this role because the dean, Thomas Wishart, was absent, having travelled to Bologna. The arbitration agreement was settled at Glasgow on the latter date.

Perhaps soon after or soon before, Thomas inspected charters of Paisley Abbey on behalf of Laurence de Ergadia, Bishop of Argyll. Here he is called Thomas Nicholay ("Thomas, son of Nicholas"). The reports confirm that he was the Glasgow subdean but the date of the inspection can be fixed no more precisely than some time between 1286 and 1295.

In 1295 he is found at the papal court acting as the commensalis ("table companion") and chaplain of Cardinal Hugh Aycelin (Hugh Seguin), the Dominican Cardinal-Bishop of Ostia. Hugh was probably making use of Dundee's training as a lawyer. At this time Thomas is said to be Dean of Brechin Cathedral. The last known dean, William, is attested in 1269, and another dean was in possession by 24 May 1275, but the name of this dean is not known. This person is probably not Thomas as it is unlikely that he was Dean of Brechin and Subdean of Glasgow at the same time.

=== Election and appointment as Bishop of Ross ===
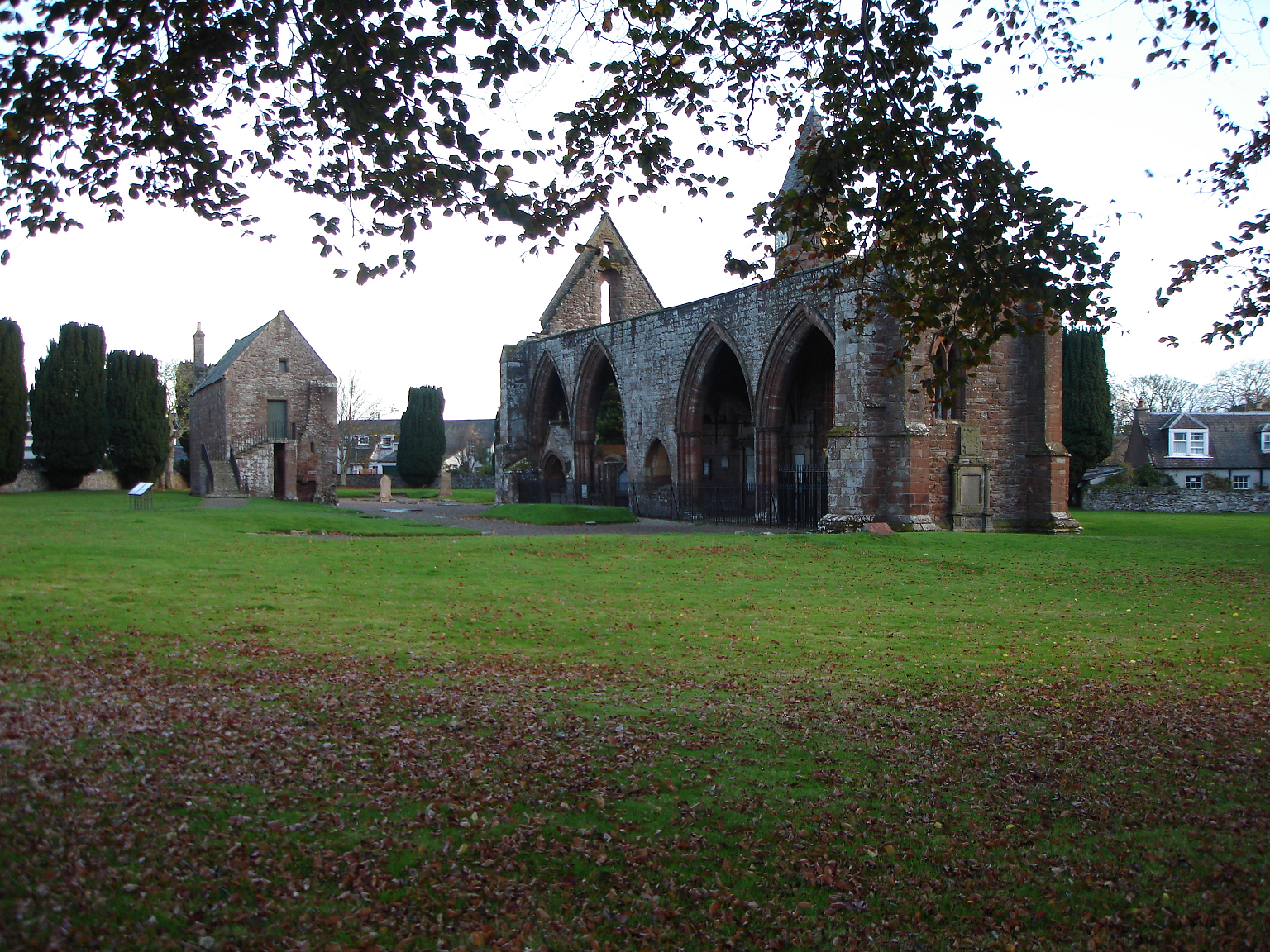
The ruins of Fortrose Cathedral on the Black Isle, the "seat" (cathedra) of the diocese of Ross

It is possible that Thomas was still at the papal court when the cathedral chapter of the diocese of Ross were carrying out their elections for the successor of Robert de Fyvie. Two separate elections took place in the period between 17 November 1292 and 18 November 1295, and it appears that the chapter elected both the cathedral precentor, Adam de Darlington, as well as Thomas de Dundee, who then held a canonry in the diocese.

Both Adam de Darlington and Thomas de Dundee resigned their rights to this episcopal see, but nevertheless Cardinal Hugh Aycelin used his influence to secure Thomas papal provision as bishop on 18 November. In the following year Adam de Darlington was compensated by being appointed Bishop of Caithness, the bishopric which adjoined Ross to the north.

Perhaps because of the political troubles in Scotland at the time, there is a two-year gap between Thomas receiving provision to the see and gaining its "temporalities", i.e. gaining actual possession of the office. Scotland's king, John de Balliol, had been in a conflict of authority with the King of the English, who deposed King John in 1296. It was not until 31 July 1297 that the temporalities of the see were released to Thomas by King Edward I of England, probably after a meeting between Thomas and King Edward at London. According to one source King Edward had been told by Pope Boniface VIII to install Thomas as bishop, Edward proceeded to judge the matter for himself. After doing so, and having received Thomas' oath of fealty, King Edward ordered John de Warrene, the Earl of Surrey, to install Thomas into his episcopal temporalities.

=== Episcopate ===
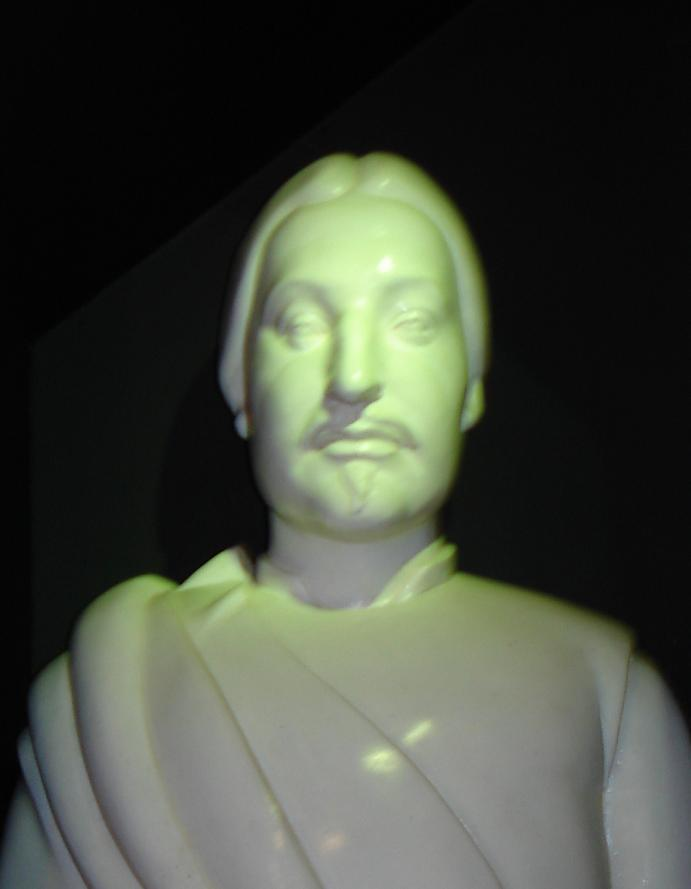
A bust of William II, Earl of Ross, made for display in the Tain Museum in Tain Ross-shire

Thomas had taken up his diocese in Scotland by 17 August 1298. On this date his seal was attached to a document which recorded the losses suffered by Scone Abbey following the Scottish rebel defeat by the English crown at the Battle of Falkirk. In the first few years of the 14th century Thomas witnessed three charters of Coupar Angus Abbey in the company of Robert Wishart, Bishop of Glasgow, a known opponent of the English crown.

He witnessed another charter relating to that abbey, between 1300 and 1302, by John de Soules, who issued it as Guardian of Scotland acting in King John Balliol's name. After the resurgence of English power in Scotland in 1304 Thomas can be found co-operating with King Edward's officials. In the autumn of 1305 King Edward planned a council of advisors to assist his new governor, John of Brittany, and Bishop Thomas was thought trustworthy enough to be included in this council.

It appears that Bishop Thomas remained pro-English and pro-Balliol after the rising in 1306 of Robert de Brus, Earl of Carrick. Bruce had himself crowned king on 25 March (becoming King Robert I of Scotland). Bishop Thomas' positions mirrored those of William II, Earl of Ross. On 7 December 1307 King Edward II of England was seeking Bishop Thomas' support against King Robert.

However, the realities of de Brus power in this part of Scotland were pushed home in the following year. On 13 December 1307 King Robert secured the submission of Bishop Thomas' temporal protector, Earl William. After this submission Bishop Thomas acted as one of the sureties for Earl William's future loyalty. The other guarantor was David de Moravia, Bishop of Moray).

Record of Bishop Thomas' activity in the following years is scarce. The sources do not name him as an attendee of the St Andrews parliament of 17 March 1309, a parliament at which many of the Scottish clergy declared their support for King Robert. However, very few prelates or churchmen were mentioned individually, so that it is not possible to conclude anything about Bishop Thomas' attendance. He may have attended most or all of the assemblies and parliaments of the following decade, but only for the parliament held at Scone on 3 December 1318 is he specifically recorded as being present.

On 29 October 1312 he attached his seal to a treaty between King Robert and the King of Norway. Thomas was the recipient of a papal mandate issued on 1 June 1317 authorising him to give dispensation for the wrongful marriage between King Robert's brother Edward de Brus and a daughter of Earl William of Ross. He is found on 1 November 1321 arranging to pay a loan which had been granted by Coupar Angus Abbey to Radulf de Dundee, a loan that had been granted all the way back in 1312.

His probable last occurrence in the sources concerned a conflict with Kinloss Abbey regarding the prebendal parish church of Avoch. The parish of Avoch lay within Thomas' diocese, but the Abbot of Kinloss claimed the primary right to possess it. A papal mandate was issued on 5 January 1325 to William de Lindores, the Chancellor of Ross, commanding him to judge the dispute. Bishop Thomas was almost certainly alive on that date, but he was dead by 17 April, when Roger, canon of Abernethy, received papal provision to the bishopric of Ross, said to be vacant by Thomas' death.

== Notes ==
Religious titles
Preceded by ? Last known dean: William (de Crachin?)	Dean of Brechin × 1295–1295	Succeeded by Imbert Aurei
Preceded by Robert de Fyvie / Adam de Darlington	Bishop of Ross; 1293 × 1295–1325	Succeeded by Roger
