= Matthew (bishop of Ross) =

- Bishop of Ross
- Church: Roman Catholic Church
- See: Diocese of Ross
- In office: 1272–1274
- Predecessor: Robert (II)
- Successor: Robert (III)
- Previous post: Succentor of Ross (fl. 1255 × 1271)

Orders
- Consecration: × 25 December 1274

Personal details
- Died: 1274 Lyon, France (?)

Matthew (died 1274) was a 13th-century cleric based in the Kingdom of Scotland. Walter Bower called him Macchabeus, a Latinization (literature) of the Gaelic name Mac Bethad or Mac Beathadh, previously held by a 12th-century bishop. Either Bower is confused or Matthew changed his name or took a pseudonym more appropriate to the environment of the "international" church, a practice not unusual in the period.

He was given the title of Magister ("Master") by Bower, indicating the completion of a university education and more particularly of a Masters' degree at some stage in his life, but details of this have not survived and the title may be spurious. He is found as succentor of the cathedral of Ross in a Moray document dating between 1255 and 1271; he is the first person known to have held this position, and probably the first to have held this new position under the new cathedral constitution of 1256.

After the death of Robert, Bishop of Ross, Matthew was part of the team of five compromissarii (delegated electors) who voted for the new bishop; as it happened, it was Matthew who was elected. He travelled to the papal court at Orvieto, along with the archdeacon Robert de Fyvie, and without waiting very long, was consecrated by Pope Gregory X personally (per nos ipsos) by 28 December 1272, on which date a mandate was issued authorising him to proceed to his bishopric.

Presumably after returning to Ross, he travelled back to continental Europe to attend the Second Council of Lyon in France, held in the summer of 1274. There, according to Bower, he died (of unspecified causes); Bower on this occasion calls him Magister Matthaeus episcopus Rossensis, "Master Matthew Bishop of Ross" rather than Macchabeus. Whether or not Bower's claim about his death at Lyon is true, the bishopric was certainly vacant by the following Christmas.

== Sources ==
- Bartlett, Robert, England Under the Norman and Angevin Kings, (Oxford, 2000)
- Dowden, John, The Bishops of Scotland, ed. J. Maitland Thomson, (Glasgow, 1912)
- Innes, Cosmo Nelson, Registrum Episcopatus Moraviensis; E Pluribus Codicibus Consarcinatum Circa A.D. Mcccc., Cum Continuatione Diplomatum Recentiorum Usque Ad A.D. Mdcxxiii, (Edinburgh, 1837)
- Watt, D. E. R., A Biographical Dictionary of Scottish Graduates to A. D. 1410, (Oxford, 1977)
- Watt, D. E. R., Fasti Ecclesiae Scotinanae Medii Aevi ad annum 1638, 2nd Draft, (St Andrews, 1969)

Religious titles
Preceded by Robert	Bishop of Ross; 1272–1274	Succeeded by Robert de Fyvie
