= Andrew Munro (bishop) =

Andrew Munro Aindréas Mac an Rothaich
- Bishop of Ross (postulate)
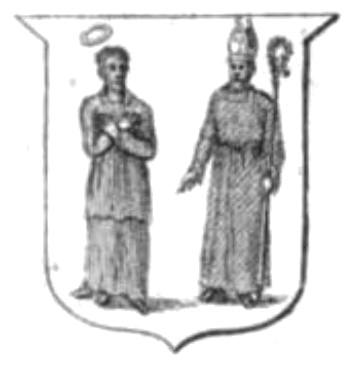
- Church: Roman Catholic Church
- See: Diocese of Ross
- In office: 1440–1441
- Predecessor: John Bullock
- Successor: Thomas Tulloch
- Previous post(s): Archdeacon of Caithness (1422–1451 × 1454)

Personal details
- Died: before 24 October 1454

Andrew Munro (died before 24 October 1454) [de Munro, de Munroy], or Aindréas Mac an Rothaich as his Gaelic kindred name, was a Scottish churchman active in the 15th century, undoubtedly given his surname a native of Ross of Clan Munro.

In either 1421 or 1422, he became Archdeacon of Ross on exchange with John de Inchmartin, and was issued a new papal provision on 6 October 1422; his provision was repeated on 11 March 1431.

Following the death of John Bullock, Bishop of Ross, in either 1439 or 1440, Munro was postulated as Bullock's successor by the cathedral chapter; his postulation, rather than election, occurred because Munro had a "defect of birth", being the son of an unmarried woman and a priest.

Despite much effort and expense, the postulation was rejected by Pope Eugenius IV, who provided instead Thomas Tulloch, the cathedral Dean. In compensation, on 4 March 1441, Eugenius granted Munro a pension of £40, to be taken from the mensal revenues of the Bishop of Ross.

Munro however sought confirmation of his postulation from the Anti-Pope, Felix V, at Basel in the Kingdom of Germany. Felix V confirmed Munro's postulation on 30 May but it was not effective. Munro is heard of again as the Commissary of the diocese of Ross in 1451, while still holding the archdeaconry; he had died by 24 October 1454.

== Notes ==
Religious titles
Preceded by John de Inchmartin	Archdeacon of Ross; 1422–1451 × 1454	Succeeded by William Ross
Preceded by John Bullock	Bishop of Ross; 1440–1441 (postulate)	Succeeded by Thomas Tulloch
