= Reinald Macer =

Roman Catholic bishop

- Bishop of Ross
- Church: Roman Catholic Church
- See: Diocese of Ross
- In office: 1195–1213
- Predecessor: Gregoir
- Successor: Andreas de Moravia
- Previous post(s): Monk of Melrose Abbey

Orders
- Consecration: 10 September 1195

Personal details
- Born: unknown unknown
- Died: 13 December 1213

Reinald Macer [also called Reginald] (died 1213) was a medieval Cistercian monk and bishop, active in the Kingdom of Scotland during the reign of William the Lion. Originally a monk of Melrose Abbey, he rose to become Bishop of Ross in 1195, and held this position until his death in 1213. He is given the nickname Macer in Roger of Howden's Chronica, a French word that meant "skinny".

== Pre-episcopal life ==
It is thought possible that Reinald had been in the company of Roland, Lord of Galloway, at some point, perhaps being involved with Roland's foundation of Glenluce Abbey in January 1192; again on purely speculative grounds, he may have had some involvement at Kinloss Abbey in the late 1180s. Reinald was a monk of Melrose Abbey when, on 27 February 1195, he was elected to succeed Gregoir as Bishop of Ross, an episcopal see whose seat at that time was located in Rosemarkie.

His election was recorded and indeed celebrated by the Melrose Chronicle, written at the abbey:

Anno M.C.XCV. obiit Gregorius episcopus de Rosmarkin, poft quem electus est dompnus Reinaldus monachus de Melros apud Dunfermelin iij. kalendas Martii feria ij. qui et consecratus est iiij. idus Septembris. O mira Dei dispositio de qua processit talis electio	In the year 1195, Gregorius, bishop of Rosemarkie, died. After him, sir Reinaldus monk of Melrose, was elected at Dunfermline, on the third day before the Kalends of March, the second day of the week [Monday 27 February]; and he was consecrated on the fourth day before the Ides of September [10 September]. Oh marvellous disposition of God, from which has proceeded such an election!

This historian Richard Oram declared that his appointment "provided the crown with a dependable ally in an influential position, within a region where its authority continued to be challenged". The occurrence of the election at Dunfermline, a long way from Rosemarkie, was probably to secure royal control.

Reinald, as "Bishop-elect" (electo Rosensi), is found witnessing a confirmation by the king of a grant by Jocelin, Bishop of Glasgow, to Jedburgh Abbey on 4 July; it was issued at Jedburgh. Between his election and consecration, Reinald was found witnessing a charter by Bishop Jocelin to Melrose Abbey. The Chronicle of Melrose goes on to say that Reinald was consecrated at St Andrews by John, Bishop of Dunkeld.

== Bishop of Ross ==
On 29 December the same year, Bishop Reinald was at Christchurch in Hampshire consecrating an altar. He witnessed two royal grants issued at Elgin to the Cistercian Kinloss Abbey on 31 July 1196. On 3 April, in a year falling inclusively between the years 1196 and 1207, probably 1199, he witnessed a royal confirmation of a grant by Thomas de Lundin to Coupar Angus Abbey; the confirmation was issued at Forfar in Angus. Bishop Reinald attended the legatine council of the Scottish church held at Perth in December 1201. He witnessed a royal grant to Hugh of Benholm of land in the Mearns on 5 April, either 1201 or 1202; this grant was issued at Kincardine.

A papal mandate dated to 27 May 1198, instructed Reinald and the Bishop of Orkney (Bjarni Kolbeinsson Skald) to compel the Bishop of Caithness to stop preventing the collection of Peter's Pence, which Earl Harald Maddadsson had granted. This errant Bishop of Caithness was John; he was standing up for the peasantry of his diocese, as well as perhaps his own revenues; collection of the Pence had a strong history in Scandinavia, and John's resistance resulted in his mutilation by Earl Harald, who had the bishop's eyes and tongue cut out.

== Death and succession ==
There is little more information about Reinald, and his role in the rebellions and warfare which took place in Ross in this period is unclear. The Melrose Chronicle recorded his obituary:

Anno M.CC xiij. obiit Reinaldus episcopus Rosensis, quondam monachus Melrosensis, ipso die sancte Lucie, post cujus obitum electus est magister Andreas de Mureuia, qui renuens episcopari, quesita licencia a dompno papa, tante dignitatis honorem humiliter resignavit; loco cujus subrogatur Robertus capellanus domini W[illelmi] regis Scottorum.	In the year 1213, Reinaldus, the bishop of Ross, formerly a monk of Melrose, died, on the day of St Lucy. And after his death, master Andreas de Mureuia was elected: but refusing to be bishop, he sought permission from the lord pope, and humbly resigned the honour of so great a dignity. Robert, the chaplain of the lord William, king of the Scots, was put in his place.

The date of his death in modern terms was 13 December 1213. The aforementioned Andreas de Moravia did eventually become a bishop, becoming Bishop of Moray in 1222. Reinald was one of several Cistercian, in fact Melrose, monks whom King William forwarded to Scottish bishoprics; notable others were the former Abbots of Melrose Jocelin of Glasgow and Adam of Caithness.

== Reinald and Roger of Howden ==
Professor A. A. M. Duncan has argued that Reinald was a friend of Roger of Howden, and that Reinald provided information to Roger regarding Rosemarkie and events in northern Scotland both in person when Roger visited Scotland and in a letter written to Roger around 1199 in the French language; Roger, it is argued, incorporated this material into his Chronica.

== Notes ==
Religious titles
Preceded by Gregoir	Bishop of Ross; 1195–1213	Succeeded by Andreas de Moravia
