= Alexander de Waghorn =

- Bishop of Ross
- Church: Roman Catholic Church
- See: Diocese of Ross
- In office: 1398–1416 × 1418
- Predecessor: Alexander de Kylwos
- Successor: Thomas Lyell /Gruffydd Young/ John Bullock
- Previous post(s): Archdeacon of Ross (1381 × 1398–1398)

Personal details
- Born: unknown unknown
- Died: 17 March 1416 × 14 February 1418

Alexander de Waghorn (d. 1416 × 1418), Bishop of Ross, bears a surname that may suggest an origin in the Glasgow area of southern Scotland, though there are other possibilities.

His pre-episcopal life is not very well documented, but when he was provided to the bishopric of Ross in 1398, he already possessed a Bachelorate in Decrees (i.e. canon law) and bore the title Archdeacon of Ross. It is not known for how long he had held the latter title, but it could have been as early as August 1376, when the last known archdeacon Alexander Man was made Bishop of Caithness.

It was on 17 August 1398, that Avignon Pope Benedict XIII provided Waghorn to the vacant diocese of Ross; the papal mandate of provision informs us that Alexander had been elected by the cathedral chapter to the vacant see, but that because the Pope had previously reserved the see for his own appointment, declared the election invalid. However, "to prevent a long and harmful vacancy" he nevertheless provided Waghorn as bishop.

There is a papal mandate, dated 4 May 1404, in which three churchmen are told to confirm one clerk named William de Tayn ("of Tain") as Chancellor of Ross because William de Tayn "doubted the validity of his presentation and institution by Alexander, bishop of Ross". A similar mandate for confirmation, this time issued to the Bishop of Moray (Henry de Lichton) and dated 16 August 1417, was as a result of similar concerns, this time in relation to one John de Kylwos, regarding Kylwos' exchange of the Ross subdeanery for the treasurership, an exchange authorised by Bishop Alexander.

On 30 June 1407, a papal mandate was issued to the Bishop of Dunkeld and the Bishop of Caithness to receive Alexander's oath of fealty to the papal see, and to ensure that a copy of the oath was sent to the papal court by letters patent under Alexander's seal. This is somewhat of a long period since his provision, and may be explained if some of the secular authorities were opposing his provision.

At this time, there was a power struggle over the province of Ross, the notable participants being Alexander Leslie, Earl of Ross, and ally to the Robert Stewart, Duke of Albany; Domhnall of Islay, Lord of the Isles, a magnate based on the western coast who was pressing his own claim to the earldom; and Alexander Stewart, Earl of Buchan, husband of the deceased Countess of Ross, Euphemia I. It is possible that Waghorn was a protégé of one of these men and, if he was, the most likely candidate is the Earl of Buchan, namely because he is found witnessing a number of charters of Isabella, Countess of Mar, wife of Buchan's illegitimate son, Alexander Stewart, Earl of Mar.

Bishop Alexander witnessed, at Kildrummy Castle in 1404, Isabella's deed handing over her rights to Buchan's son. He was at Perth on 18 July 1408, where he attended an ecclesiastical council and witnessed a deed. He can be found at St Andrews on 4 and 6 February 1414, attending the ceremonies celebrating the receipt of the papal bull which authorised the founding of the University of St Andrews; Bishop Alexander made a sermon on 6 February. He is found for the last time at Perth on 17 March 1416, witnessing a transumpt made by an ecclesiastical council. It is not known when he died, but the earliest secure date is 14 February 1418.

== Notes ==
Religious titles
Preceded by ? Last known archdeacon: Alexander Man	Archdeacon of Ross; 1381 × 1398–1398	Succeeded by David Seton
Preceded by Alexander de Kylwos	Bishop of Ross; 1398–1416 × 1418	Succeeded by Thomas Lyell
