= Robert de Fyvie =

- Bishop of Ross
- Church: Roman Catholic Church
- See: Diocese of Ross
- In office: 1275–1292 × 1295
- Predecessor: Matthew
- Successor: Adam de Darlington / Thomas de Dundee
- Previous post: Archdeacon of Ross (1249 × 1269–1275)

Orders
- Consecration: 8 April 1275

Personal details
- Born: unknown unknown
- Died: 17 November 1292 × 18 November 1295

Robert de Fyvie [also de Fyvin] (d. 1292 × 1295) was a prelate based in the Kingdom of Scotland in the last quarter of the 13th century. Perhaps coming from Fyvie in Formartine, from a family of Teesdale origin, Robert was Archdeacon of Ross and a student at the University of Bologna by 1269. In 1275, he was not only a graduate but the new Bishop of Ross, a post he held until his death in the first half of the 1290s.

== Early life and career ==
There has been confusion over his name in some sources. Papal sources use S instead of F, Syvin instead of Fyvin, while Scottish sources use the F; Walter Bower erroneously believed his forename was "Thomas", a mistake that was followed by the early modern ecclesiastical historian Robert Keith. His name almost certainly indicates that he came from Fyvie, a royal burgh in the province of Formartine, a royal demesne territory under heavy influence from the immigrant le Cheyne family as well as the Comyn-controlled earldom of Buchan.

He is found as a student at the University of Bologna on 5 December 1269, when along with one Alan de Edinburgh he gave a receipt for 20 marks to some Florentine merchants; in this appearance he is recorded as Archdeacon of Ross, a position which, under the Fortrose Cathedral constitution of 1256, meant he must have already been in deacon's orders, as this constitution made that a prerequisite for holding the archdeaconry. He must have become Archdeacon of Ross sometime after the last known archdeacon, Robert, had become consecrated as Bishop of Ross, that is, after either 1249 or 1250, though there may have been one or several unrecorded archdeacons in an intervening period.

It is extremely probable that his accession to the archdeaconry owed something to Comyn influence, Fyvie being from Comyn's area of influence and Alexander Comyn, Earl of Buchan, being sheriff of Dingwall in the 1260s (1264–1266). It is likely that Robert was still in Bologna in 1272; in that year, Robert was not one of the five compromissarii selected by the Ross cathedral chapter who elected Matthew as Bishop of Ross, but the chapter did appoint him to accompany Matthew to the papal court at Orvieto, presumably because he was conveniently still in Italy. Robert had graduated with a Master's degree by 1275.

== Bishop of Ross ==
Robert de Fyvie was back in Scotland when, on 8 April 1275, Pope Gregory X granted Robert de Fyvie, now Bishop-elect of Ross, mandate for local confirmation and consecration; the election had occurred at some point after the death of Bishop Matthew at the Second Council of Lyons in the summer of 1274. The decree of election had been presented to the Pope by Donnchadh and Master William, canons of the diocese of Ross; having been examined and approved by three cardinals, the mandate was sent to William Wishart, Bishop of St Andrews, and Hugh de Benin, Bishop of Aberdeen, instructing them to examine his fitness for the bishopric and, if they approved, consecrate him with the assistance of a third bishop. The bishopric was still in crown hands in June, but it is probable that Robert was consecrated by 6 August, the date of the meeting of the Scottish prelates with the papal tax collector at Perth.

Bishop Robert appeared next on 16 September 1278, at Eddyrdor (now Redcastle), witnessing alongside three of his canons and Uilleam II, Earl of Ross, a grant to Beauly Priory. On 27 September 1279, at Kiltarlity in Inverness-shire, and on 26 March 1280, at Kinloss in Moray, Bishop Robert, along with his cathedral dean and the Prior of Beauly, acted as a papal judge-delegate in a dispute between Archibald, Bishop of Moray, and the lord of Beaufort, a French settlement in the Aird that had the Scottish name Dùnaidh (Dounie). On 18 July 1285, Pope Honorius IV issued Bishop Robert a letter protecting the bishop and his churches against alleged oppressions conducted by the officials of King Alexander III of Scotland; it is possible that Bishop Robert had travelled to the papal curia at Tivoli to obtain this protection.

However, five years later the bishop found himself in trouble with the papacy. On 28 November 1290, Pope Nicholas IV commanded the Bishop of Aberdeen, Henry le Chen, Thomas de Balmerino, Abbot of Scone, and John de Haddington, Prior of St Andrews, to ensure that certain complaints regarding Bishop Robert were redressed; Bishop Robert's dean and cathedral chapter were unhappy regarding his alleged abuse of property, particularly the granting of money and benefices to his kinsmen and friends at the expense of the clergy of the diocese. Men who benefited under Robert's episcopate included a large number of Englishmen from the area around the River Tees, including Adam de Darlington, Thomas de Jar and John de Hedlam, perhaps indicating that Robert's family may have taken its ultimate origin from that area of England.

Bishop Robert was one of the Scottish political figures present when the Treaty of Salisbury was confirmed as the Treaty of Birgham on 17 March 1290; he subsequently became one of the Comyn-backed auditors appointed for the case of John de Balliol at Norham, in the Great Cause. Bishop Robert de Fyvie swore fealty to King Edward I of England on 1 August 1291, along with the Earl of Ross and Henry le Chen. He can be found as an auditor at Berwick during the proceedings, on 21 June, 6 November and 17 November 1292.

The bishop cannot be found in the records after 17 November, though no successor to the bishopric is known until 18 November 1295, making Bishop Robert's date and year of death something of a mystery.

== Notes ==
Religious titles
Preceded by Robert	Archdeacon of Ross; 1249 × 1269–1275	Succeeded by John de Musselburgh
Preceded by Matthew	Bishop of Ross; 1275–1292 × 1295	Succeeded by Adam de Darlington / Thomas de Dundee
