= Thomas Tulloch (bishop of Ross) =

Bishop of Ross

- Bishop of Ross
- Church: Roman Catholic Church
- See: Diocese of Ross
- In office: 1440–1460 × 1461
- Predecessor: John Bullock
- Successor: Henry Cockburn
- Previous post(s): Archdeacon of Caithness (1428–1437); Dean of Ross (1436/7–1440)

Orders
- Consecration: Before 14 October 1440

Personal details
- Born: unknown unknown
- Died: 1460 × 1461

Thomas Tulloch [de Tulloch] (d. 1460 × 1461) was a prelate active in the Kingdom of Scotland in the 15th century. A letter of Pope Martin V in 1429 claimed that he was "of a great noble race by both parents". Robert Keith believed that he had the surname "Urquhart", but that is not supported by the contemporary evidence and is probably spurious.

== Pre-episcopal career ==
In November 1429, he was given the parish church of Longforgan, in Gowrie, in the diocese of St Andrews, to be held in "perpetual vicarage"; he was to hold this along with the Caithness archdeaconry and the prebend of Croy in the diocese of Moray. He had exchanged with Thomas de Greenlaw to become Archdeacon of Caithness a year before, and received papal provision on 12 March 1428, though it is not clear that he ever took possession; he resigned the position in exchange for parochial benefices on 15 July 1437, namely the parish of Tannadice, diocese of St Andrews.

In the same year (1437), Tulloch won his litigation against John de Innes for the position of Dean of Ross; after the death of William Fayrhar, probably in earlier in 1436, Tulloch received provision while Innes was collated to the position locally. However, Laurence Piot had also received provision for the position, and Tulloch likewise was involved against Piot in litigation; Tulloch retained possession of the deanery until resigning his right to James de Innes on 23 September 1440, three days before he was provided to the bishopric of Ross. On that same day, i.e. on 23 September, he was provided as Subdean of Dunkeld, but resigned later in the day.

== Bishop of Ross ==
Tulloch received provision to the Ross bishopric on 26 September from Pope Eugenius IV at the papal court, and on 14 October, he paid the papacy 600 gold florins; by the time of this payment, he had already received consecration. On 10 February 1441 a safe-conduct was issued to Thomas Tulloch, at that time in Flanders, on his way back to Scotland from the papal court. The postulation to the bishopric of Andrew Munro, Archdeacon of Ross, by the cathedral chapter of Fortrose was rejected by Pope Eugenius IV.

He was in Scotland in May 1443. He was witness to a royal charter on 24 January 1450. He attended the Edinburgh parliament of 24 September 1451. On 17 June 1455, Bishop Thomas, along with the other bishops of Scotland, sealed the forfeiture of James Douglas, 9th Earl of Douglas. In the 18th century, Bishop Tulloch's name was apparently on an inscription, dated to 1460. He seems to have died before 23 March 1461, when his successor Henry Cockburn received papal provision to the (now) vacant bishopric, though one early modern antiquarian claimed his death occurred "in 1463 before Oct[ober]".

== Notes ==
Religious titles
Preceded by Thomas de Greenlaw	Archdeacon of Caithness; 1428–1437	Succeeded by James Bruce
Preceded by William Fayrhar	Dean of Ross; 1436/7–1440	Succeeded by James de Innes
Preceded by John Bullock	Bishop of Ross; 1440–1460 × 1461	Succeeded by Henry Cockburn
