= Alexander Stewart (bishop of Ross) =

Scottish bishop

- Bishop of Ross
- Church: Roman Catholic Church
- See: Diocese of Ross
- In office: 1350–1371
- Predecessor: Roger
- Successor: Alexander de Kylwos
- Previous post(s): Archdeacon of Ross (× 1343–1350)

Orders
- Consecration: 3 November 1350 × 9 March 1351

Personal details
- Born: unknown unknown
- Died: 4 February 1371 – 9 May 1371

Alexander Stewart (died 1371) was a 14th-century Scottish bishop. Probably from Menteith, he appears in the sources from the first half of the 1340s, possessing a university degree and holding the position of Archdeacon of Ross. He was active at the papal curia in the second half of the decade as a papal chaplain and administrator, before being provided as Bishop of Ross in 1350, a position he held until his death in 1371.

== Early life ==
Alexander Stewart was from the diocese of Dunblane, a diocese which embraced the earldom of Strathearn and the earldom of Menteith; as the Stewart family were better established in Menteith than Strathearn, it is likely that Alexander came from Menteith. It is notable that Stewart's arms, as well as having the Stewart chequy, included the three lion rampants which denoted the earls of Ross, suggesting some connection between Alexander Stewart and the Ross family.

Before Stewart's career as a prelate, he spent many years at university. He held a Licentiate in Decrees (i.e. Canon law) by July 1343, and by March 1348 was being styled Magister ("Master"), indicating completion a Master's degree, though the accuracy of this title is not certain because he is only styled "Master" on one occasion.

== Early career ==
He is found as Archdeacon of Ross on 22 July 1343, a position he had probably held for many years previously; it is probable that he was helped into this position by the Bishop of Ross, Roger, also from the diocese of Dunblane.

On that date he was granted provision to a canonry in the diocese of Dunkeld with expectation of a prebend; on 27 March 1348, he claimed to hold a Dunkeld prebend, as he did on 22 June 1350. He was surrogated by Donnchadh de Strathearn, now Bishop of Dunkeld, to the prebend of Cruden in the diocese of Aberdeen on that date (22 March 1348), though it is not clear that this was ever effective; he was ordered to resign this right when given provision to the prebend and canonry of Kinnoir in the diocese of Moray on 2 June 1350.

Stewart probably spent the late 1340s at the papal court in Avignon. He was appointed as a papal chaplain on 6 August 1346. Stewart may have been in the service of Cardinal Guillaume de la Jugié, who is found aiding Stewart in 1348 and 1350. This influence probably explains his provision to the prebends mentioned above. On 18 May 1347 and 13 June 1350 he was named by three Scots as the mandatory for their papal graces.

== Bishop of Ross ==
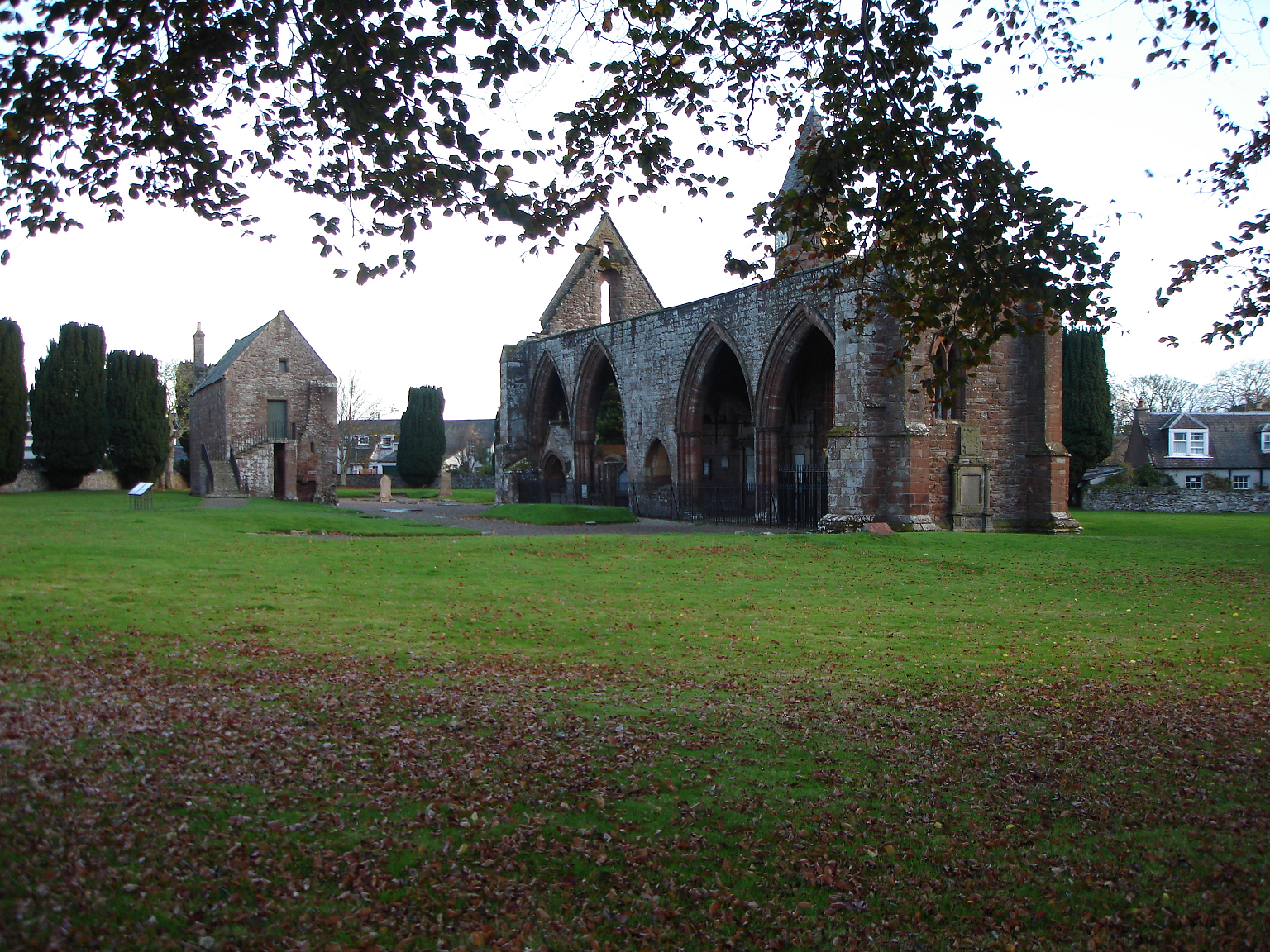
The ruins of Fortrose Cathedral on the Black Isle, the "seat" (cathedra) of the diocese of Ross.

After the resignation of Bishop Roger, on 3 November 1350, Alexander Stewart was provided to the now vacant diocese of Ross; Bishop Roger, "for reasonable causes", had resigned the see at the papal curia through three proctors, and Stewart's presence at the papal court was fortuitous, as the pope had previous reserved the see for his own appointment. He promised his services on the same day as John de Rait, newly Bishop of Aberdeen, that is, on 26 January 1351. He was consecrated by 9 March, when he was granted permission to borrow money in order to pay for his expenses at Avignon.

He is found in Scotland for the first time when, on 6 March 1352, he witnessed a charter of King David II of Scotland at Scone. He nevertheless continued his involvement in papal service, being mentioned as a mandatory in ten papal graces between March 1351 and July 1353; on 9 July 1364, he was instructed by the papacy to investigate alleged overcharging on the pilgrimage boat from Queensferry on the river Forth.

His seal, along with that of other Scottish prelates, was appended to the obligation document drawn up for King David II's ransom at an assembly in Edinburgh on 26 September 1357. His seal was attached to an indenture at Auldearn on 2 January 1365; and to a deed drawn up at Perth on 16 October 1370.

He was at the Scone parliament of 18 November 1358, at the Scone parliament of 26 July 1366. He did not attend the Perth parliament of 27 September 1367, nor the Scone parliament of 6 March 1369. He attended the Council General at Perth on 13 January 1365.

He witnessed many charters in or around Ross during his episcopate, but also various royal charters, including those issued at Scone on 18 November 1358. He witnessed a private deed by Andrew Leslie, another by Patrick Grant of Stratherrick, and two by Hugh de Ross, the brother of the earl of Ross, at Cullisse near Nigg.

He witnessed several charters of the earl himself, Uilleam III, in the 1350s and 1360s, including ones at Delny on 5 March 1356, on 17 June 1357, on 12 November 1358, and another on 5 April 1366; he witnessed other comital charters at Dingwall, on 21 December 1366, on 9 August 1369, and on 4 February 1371.

The last appearance is the latest appearance he made in any documentation. He may have been dead by the Scone parliament of 27 March 1371, to which he failed to appear. He was definitely dead by 9 May, when his successor Alexander de Kylwos received papal provision to the now vacant diocese.

== Notes ==
Religious titles
Preceded by ? Last known archdeacon: John de Musselburgh	Archdeacon of Ross × 1343–1350	Succeeded by Thomas de Urquhart
Preceded by Roger	Bishop of Ross; 1350–1371	Succeeded by Alexander de Kylwos
