= Thomas Lyell =

- Bishop of Ross
- Church: Roman Catholic Church
- See: Diocese of Ross
- In office: 1416 × 1418 (elect)
- Predecessor: Alexander de Waghorn
- Successor: John Bullock

Orders
- Consecration: none

Personal details
- Born: 1372 unknown
- Died: Unknown

Thomas Lyell [or Lyel] was a Scottish clergyman associated with the diocese of Ross in the late 14th century and early 15th century. After William de Tarbat, Subdean of Ross, was elected Dean of Ross, on 1 May 1395, Thomas was provided as William's successor. Thomas however does not seem to have secured the position, losing out to John de Kylwos, a relative of the Bishop of Ross, Alexander de Kylwos.

After the death of Alexander de Waghorn, Bishop of Ross, the cathedral chapter elected Lyell as Waghorn's successor. Lyell was at this stage holding an unnamed canonry and prebend in the diocese of Ross, the parish church of Kinnell in Angus in the diocese of St Andrews and the chaplaincy of Kirriemuir, also in Angus in that diocese. His election was overturned by Pope Benedict XIII on the grounds that he had previously reserved the see for his own appointment; on 9 March 1418, he provided John Bullock instead.

On 16 March, Benedict issued a mandate to the Abbot of Arbroath to pay Lyell 40 gold crowns in compensation for the expenditure that Thomas Lyell had undertaken in order to follow up his failed election, which had involved him travelling to the papal curia at Peñíscola in Spain. Two days later Benedict granted Thomas a canonry with expectation of a prebend in the diocese of Aberdeen, which he was allowed to hold alongside his other benefices.

On 1 June, Benedict deprived one Thomas de Merton of his canonry and prebend in the diocese of Brechin because he was a "schismatic and adherent of Oddo Colonna calling himself Martin V", charges which Lyell had made while at Benedict's court; in two mandates to the Abbot of Arbroath, the latter was instructed to give Merton's canonry and prebend to Lyell, which again Lyell was allowed to hold without giving up his other benefices.

== Notes ==
Religious titles
Preceded by Alexander de Waghorn	Bishop of Ross; 1416 × 1418; Elect only	Succeeded by John Bullock
