= Adam de Darlington =

English churchman

- Bishop of Caithness
- Church: Roman Catholic Church
- See: Diocese of Caithness
- In office: 1296
- Predecessor: Alan de St Edmund
- Successor: Andrew
- Previous post(s): Bishop of Ross (elect) (1292 × 1295); Precentor of Ross (fl. 1255 × 1271)

Orders
- Consecration: 8 April 1275

Personal details
- Born: unknown unknown
- Died: 29 April × 17 December 1296; Siena, Tuscany, Italy

Adam de Darlington [Derlingtun] (died 1296) was a 13th-century English churchman based in the Kingdom of Scotland. Adam's name occurred for the first time in a Moray document datable between 1255 and 1271, where he was named as the Precentor of Fortrose Cathedral. He seems to have been introduced into the diocese of Ross, along with others from the north-east of England, by Bishop Robert de Fyvie, who may have been descended from the area.

After the death of Bishop Robert, sometime between 17 November 1292 and 18 November 1295, two elections were conducted by the cathedral chapter of Ross: one elected Precentor Adam and the other elected Thomas de Dundee. Darlington travelled to the papal curia, but on or before 18 November, resigned his right to Dundee.

He did however obtain a bishopric, becoming Bishop of Caithness. On 26 April 1296, as Precentor of Ross he was provided to the Caithness diocese, vacant since the death of Alan de St Edmund in 1291, and consecrated by Hugh Aycelin, Cardinal-Bishop of Ostia. He was not to be bishop long however, perhaps not even long enough to visit his new bishopric. He died at Siena some time before 17 December 1296, when Andrew, Abbot of Coupar Angus, was provided to the now vacant see of Caithness.

== Notes ==
Religious titles
Preceded by Robert de Fyvie	Bishop of Ross; 1292 × 1295 elect only	Succeeded by Thomas de Dundee
Preceded by Alan de St Edmund	Bishop of Caithness; 1296	Succeeded by Andrew
