= Gregoir of Rosemarkie =

Gregoir
- Bishop of Ross
- Church: Roman Catholic Church
- See: Diocese of Ross
- In office: 1161–1195
- Predecessor: Symeon
- Successor: Reinald Macer

Personal details
- Born: unknown unknown
- Died: 1195

Gregoir [Gregory, Gregorius] (died 1195) is the third known 12th century Bishop of Ross, an episcopal see then based at Rosemarkie.

== Biography ==
According to the Chronicle of Melrose, Gregoir was consecrated by Ernald, Bishop of St Andrews acting as a Papal legate, in 1161.

He occurred in a document of Scone Abbey in either 1163 or 1164, namely in "the eleventh year of Malcolm", the year ending 23 May 1164. He witnessed a charter issued at Inverness by King William the Lion, datable to between 1172 and 1174, confirming a gift of land made by Simon de Tosny, Bishop of Moray, to a hermit in Inverness-shire. Little more is known of his episcopate.

The Chronicle of Melrose reported his death in 1195, and the election of his successor Reinald Macer in March of that year. The English chronicler Roger of Howden gave his death-date for the same year, and added that it fell in the month of February.

== Notes ==
Religious titles
Preceded by Symeon	Bishop of Ross; 1161–1195	Succeeded by Reinald Macer
