= Capellanus =

Capellanus (chaplain) may refer to 12/13th century figures:

- Andreas Capellanus (also known as Andrew the Chaplain or André le Chapelain), 12th-century author of a treatise commonly known as De amore ("About Love")
- Walter Capellanus of St Albans, bishop of Glasgow, An important cleric and politician in the Kingdom of Scotland during the reigns of kings William the Lion and Alexander II
- Robert Capellanus (also known as Robert the Chaplain; d. c. 1249), chaplain of King William I of Scotland and afterwards, Bishop of Ross (1214–1249)
- John Capellanus (died 1147), early 12th-century Tironensian cleric. He was the chaplain and close confidant of king David I of Scotland before becoming Bishop of Glasgow and founder of Glasgow Cathedral. He was one of the most significant religious reformers in the history of Scotland
