= Roger (bishop of Ross) =

- Bishop of Ross
- Church: Roman Catholic Church
- See: Diocese of Ross
- In office: 1325–1350
- Predecessor: Thomas de Dundee
- Successor: Alexander Stewart
- Previous post(s): Canon of Abernethy

Orders
- Consecration: 17 April × 19 May 1325

Personal details
- Born: unknown unknown
- Died: unknown

Roger (died in or after 1350) was a churchman based in the 14th century Kingdom of Scotland, and active as Bishop of Ross from 1325 until 1350. Before attaining this position, Roger was a canon of Abernethy; it is possible that Roger was an Augustinian, because it is often thought that Abernethy did not become a collegiate church until some time after 1328, after the marriage of the Abernethy heiress to the Earl of Angus; this however is not certain, as the exact details of Abernethy's transition from being an Céli Dé abbey (until c. 1272–1273) to an Augustinian priory to a secular college are only vaguely understood.

It was as a canon of Abernethy that, on 17 April 1325, he was issued papal provision to the diocese of Ross, vacant by the death of Thomas de Dundee. Roger was consecrated by Cardinal Guillaume Pierre Godin, Bishop of Sabina, at the papal curia sometime before 19 May. Bishop Roger witnessed several royal charters during his episcopate. He witnessed a charter at Edinburgh on 4 March 1328; at Arbroath on 17 June 1341; and at Scone on 4 July 1342, and another (location not specified) on 4 July 1342. Bishop Roger resigned the bishopric "for reasonable cause" at the papal curia on or sometime before 3 November 1350, when Alexander Stewart was provided in his place; Roger cannot be traced after that.

Donald Watt has argued that Roger is the same as Roger de Balnebrich, unfruitfully elected Bishop of Dunblane sometime between 1319 and 1322, and who Watt suggests had remained at the papal curia until provided to Ross. Abernethy did lie in the diocese of Dunblane; Balnebrich held the position of rector of Forteviot when he was elected Bishop of Dunblane. The suggestion is strengthened by Balnebrich's disappearance from the records after his failure to obtain Dunblane at the papal curia in March 1322. Unfortunately, as Professor Watt acknowledged, because the scarce evidence has not as yet given Roger, as Bishop of Ross, a surname, and because it has not yielded any direct statement to this effect, it cannot be proven that Roger (Bishop of Ross) and Roger de Balnebrich were one and the same person.

== Notes ==
Religious titles
Preceded by Thomas de Dundee	Bishop of Ross; 1325–1350	Succeeded by Alexander Stewart
