= Radulf II, Abbot of Kinloss =

Radulf
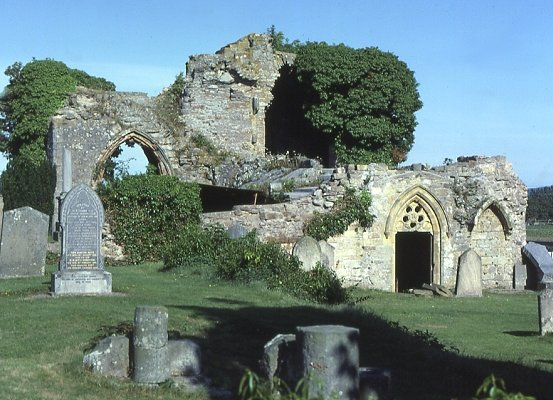
- Modern ruins of Kinloss Abbey
- Born: Probably mid-to-late 1100s Unknown
- Died: 2 November 1220; Kinloss
- Other names: Radulphus
- Occupation: Abbot
- Title: Abbot of Kinloss

Radulf (died 1220) was a 13th-century Scoto-Norman Cistercian monk and abbot. Most details about Radulf's career and all details about his early life are not known. His earliest certain occurrence in history is his appearance as Abbot of Kinloss in a Melrose charter datable to between 1202 and 1207. It is not known for certain when he became abbot of Kinloss Abbey, but the last known abbot of Kinloss, also called Radulf, left Kinloss in 1194 to become abbot of Melrose, putting Radulf II's succession somewhere between 1194 and 1207. Written in the margins next to Radulf's obituary is the assertion that he was the 4th Abbot of Kinloss, and if these are accurate, Radulf II would have succeeded not long after Radulf I's departure to Melrose Abbey in 1194.

Radulf is given centre role in a passage by the 15th-century historian Walter Bower, Abbot of Inchcolm. Bower related that in 1214 it was the turn of Radulf to go the meeting of the general chapter of the Cistercian Order. The Cistercian order in Scotland was obliged to attend the general Cistercian chapter at Cîteaux every four years. While on the journey in France, a lay brother who was serving as the cook of the various abbots had the tasking of purchasing and preparing a meal for the travel party. According to Bower, he served the abbots fish and the others meat, but used the fat from the meat on the fish, pretending it to be butter. All the abbots, forbidden to eat animal meat, believed that it was butter, and consumed the fat drenched fish. After the meal, all of the abbots save Radulf (who was meditating) fell asleep. In Bower's story, a spirit (sent by the Devil) in the form of a black man (Ethiops) came through a high window, and went around the sleeping abbots laughing at them; when the black man came to the lay brother, he embraced him, kissed him and applauded him. This prompted Abbot Radulf to interrogate the lay brother, who confessed his transgression and received penance. Bower's source for this story is not known.

Radulf's abbacy witnessed the foundation of Deer Abbey as a daughter house of Kinloss. According to the Chronicle of Melrose, Abbot Radulf died on 2 November 1220. The Chronicle reported his death as follows:

Dominus Radulphus, the abbot of Kinloss, full of good days, in holy old age migrated, as we believe, from earth to heaven.

He was succeeded by the Abbot of Deer, Robert.

== Notes ==
Religious titles
Preceded by Radulf (I)	Abbot of Kinloss; 1194( x 1207)–1220	Succeeded by Robert
