= John Bullock (bishop) =

Bishop (??–1439/40)

- Bishop of Ross
- Church: Roman Catholic Church
- See: Diocese of Ross
- In office: 1418–1439 × 1440
- Predecessor: Alexander de Waghorn
- Successor: Andrew Munro / Thomas de Tulloch

Orders
- Consecration: 16 July × 16 August 1420

Personal details
- Born: unknown unknown
- Died: 4 September 1439 × 26 September 1440

John Bullock O.S.A. (d. 1439 × 1440) was an Augustinian canon and prelate active in the 15th century Kingdom of Scotland. While earning a university degree between 1409 and 1417, Bullock gained several benefices in Scotland, and claimed the headship of St Andrews Cathedral Priory before becoming Bishop of Ross in 1418. He held the latter position until his death, which occurred in either 1439 or 1440.

== Early career ==
Though his career has not been elaborated by modern historians, Bullock is known to have been a university graduate, having a B. Dec., i.e. a Bachelorate in Decrees (canon law); he did not hold that degree in 1409, but did by 1417.

Bullock was a canon regular in the diocese of St. Andrews, and on 23 March 1409, is recorded as holding the vicarage of Dull in the diocese of Dunkeld when Avignon Pope Benedict XIII granted his petition to hold the vicarage of Tranent in the diocese of St Andrews.

A letter of Benedict XIII, dated 5 June 1417, reveals that John Bullock was one of three clergymen claiming the title Prior of St Andrews, a claim which he seems to have given up in the following year when he had the chance to become Bishop of Ross.

== Bishop of Ross ==
A papal mandate dated 9 March 1418, provided John, "elect of Ross", to "the bishopric of Ross, vacant by the death outside the curia of Alexander, late bishop under whom the bishopric was reserved to papal provision."

On 11 March, an indult was issued to John allowing him to be consecrated by any bishop of his choice, assisted by two other bishops. Another papal letter, issued on 15 March, granted one John Begiert, OSA, B. Dec., canon of St Andrews, the vicarage of Dull, "vacant by the promotion of John Bullock, former vicar, to the bishopric of Ross".

The pope has reserved the bishopric of Ross for his own appointment and, on 16 March, Thomas Lyell, who had been elected by the cathedral chapter of Fortrose "in ignorance of the reservation", was granted 40 crowns in compensation for his expenses, and two days later, he was granted a canonry in the diocese of Aberdeen allowed to be held alongside his other benefices.

Bullock was in possession of the temporalities of the bishopric by 1 August 1419. He was consecrated between 16 July, when as "elect and confirmed" he sent a proctor to the Provincial Synod, and 16 August 1420, when he as "through the grace of Gode Byschop of Rosse", sealed a charter.

As a sign of reconciliation and the ending of the Western Schism, Pope Martin V confirmed Benedict XIII's provision and retrospectively confirmed Bullock's acts as bishop on 1 February 1423, after the translation of Gruffydd Young to the titular bishopric of Hippo.

Most of the details of Bullock's episcopate are obscure. On 4 September 1439, Bishop Bullock appended his seal to the contract between Joan Beaufort, Queen Dowager, and Sir Alexander Livingston of Callendar, a contract that made Livingstone guardian of the boy king, James II of Scotland.

He is dead by 26 September 1440, when a papal mandate rejected the postulation of Andrew Munro and provided Thomas de Tulloch to the bishopric, explicitly vacant because of Bullock's death.

== Notes ==
Religious titles
Preceded by Alexander de Waghorn / Thomas Lyell	Bishop of Ross; 1418–1439 × 1440	Succeeded by Andrew Munro / Thomas de Tulloch
