= Robert I (bishop of Ross) =

Robert (I.)
- Bishop of Ross
- Church: Roman Catholic Church
- See: Diocese of Ross
- In office: 1214–1249
- Predecessor: Andreas de Moravia / Reinald Macer
- Successor: Robert (II.)
- Previous post(s): Royal Chaplain

Orders
- Consecration: 17 February × 7 July 1215

Personal details
- Born: unknown unknown
- Died: c. 1249

Robert Capellanus ("Robert the Chaplain"; died c. 1249), was a chaplain of King William I of Scotland and afterwards, Bishop of Ross (1214–1249).

On 25 February 1213, he witnessed a confirmation of the properties of Arbroath Abbey as Roberto Capellano domini regis, "Robert Chaplain of the lord king". King William had had another chaplain called Robert who became Archdeacon of Glasgow 1195 × 1196, but although neither used surnames, it is certain that they were not the same men. It would probably be possible to know more about Robert if he had used a surname, but as it happens his details are lost in those large number of Norman and Anglo-Norman incomers in William's reign using that name.

After reporting the death of the previous Bishop of Ross, Reinald Macer, the Chronicle of Melrose related that:

| electus est magister Andreas de Mureuia, qui renuens episcopari, quesita licencia a dompno papa, tante dignitatis honorem humiliter resignavit; loco cujus subrogatur Robertus capellanus domini W[illelmi] regis Scottorum. | master Andreas de Mureuia was elected: but refusing to be bishop, he sought permission from the lord pope, and humbly resigned the honour of so great a dignity. Robert, the chaplain of the lord William, king of the Scots, was put in his place. |

Andreas de Moravia's refusal to accept his own election had led thus to the elevation of the king's chaplain. This election occurred before the death of King William on 4 December 1214. Robert's name occurred as "bishop-elect" on 17 February 1215, but he is a consecrated bishop by 7 July, meaning he had received consecration between these respective dates.

Robert appeared on various documents during the reign of King Alexander II of Scotland; he appeared on 30 March 1226, again on 1 February 1227, and on 30 June 1228. Pope Gregory IX issued, on 29 May 1235, Robert the authority to increase the number of cathedral prebends, augment existing prebends and expand his cathedral. This mandate was repeated, in an expanded form, in 1256, for his successor. According to Professor Donald Watt, it may have been this bishop rather than Robert II whom Bower remembered as the builder of Ross cathedral. Robert Capellanus appears to have died in 1249.

== Notes ==
Religious titles
| Preceded by Andreas de Moravia / Reinald Macer | Bishop of Ross; 1214–1249 | Succeeded by Robert |
