= Fortrose Cathedral =

- Church of Saint Peter and Saint Boniface of Fortrose
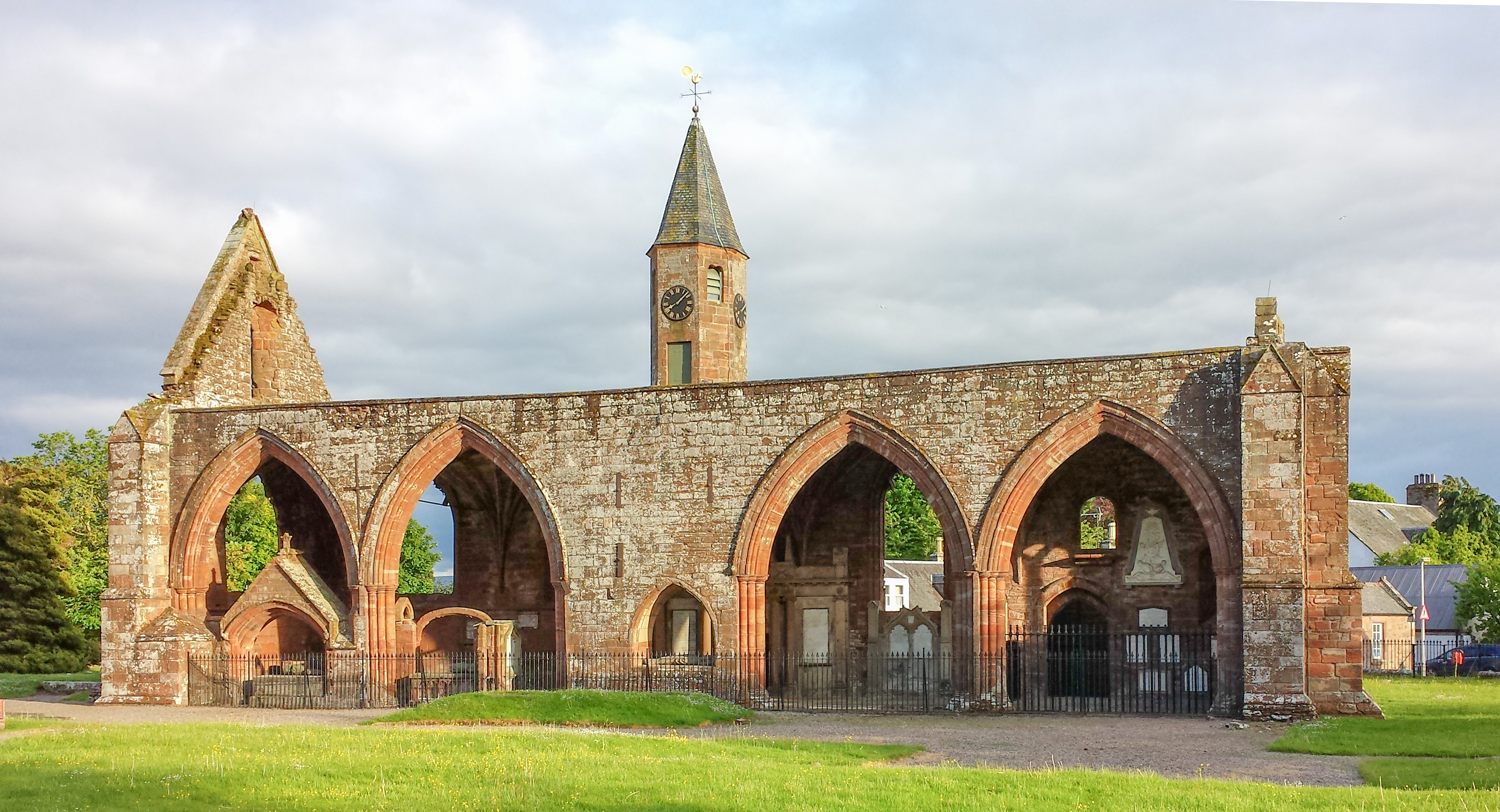
- Ruins of the cathedral
- Fortrose Cathedral
- 57.580885°N 4.130495°W
- Country: Scotland
- Denomination: Church of Scotland
- Previous denomination: Roman Catholic

History
- Founded: c. 1200
- Founder: unknown
- Dedication: Saint Peter

Architecture
- Architectural type: Late Gothic

Administration
- Diocese: Ross

Clergy
- Bishop: Bishop of Ross

Fortrose Cathedral was the episcopal seat (cathedra) of the medieval Scottish diocese of Ross in the Highland region of Scotland near the city of Inverness. It is probable that the original site of the diocese was at Rosemarkie, but by the 13th century the canons had relocated a short distance to the south-west, to the site known as Fortrose or Chanonry. According to Gervase of Canterbury, in the early 13th century the cathedral of Ross was manned by Céli Dé (culdees).

== Chapter and prebends ==
The cathedral had twenty-one prebends involving the income of thirty-one churches. After the reconstruction of the cathedral chapter in the 1250s, the bishop of Ross held Nigg and Tarbat, the archdeacon of Ross Fodderty and Killearnan (previously holding Lemlair and Logie Bride too), the dean Ardersier and Kilmuir, the chanter Kinnnettes and Suddy, the treasurer Urquhart and Logiebride ("Logie Wester"), the sub-dean Edderton and Tain (later going to the provost of the collegiate church at Tain), and the sub-chanter Inverferan and Bron (merged later as Urray).

The chancellor of Ross, appearing to hold no fixed prebend in the 13th century, later acquired Kilmorack; he exchanged it with the chanter in the 16th century for Kinnnettes and Suddy. The wealthy parishes of Rosemarkie and Cromarty were quartered between the dean, chanter, chancellor and treasurer. Likewise, was quartered between the dean, chancellor, chanter and treasurer. The western churches of Applecross, Gairloch, Kintail, Lochalsh, Lochbroom and Lochcarron were held by the chapter in common.

Alness, Contin, Cullicudden, Dingwall, Kilchrist, Kilmuir (Easter), Kiltearn, Kincardine, Kirkmichael, Logie Methet ("Logie Easter"), Rosskeen (with Nonakiln) also constituted prebends for the cathedral. By the early 14th century, the abbot of Kinloss was a permanent member of the Fortrose cathedral chapter on account of holding in perpetuity the rectorship of the parish of Avoch.

== Building ==
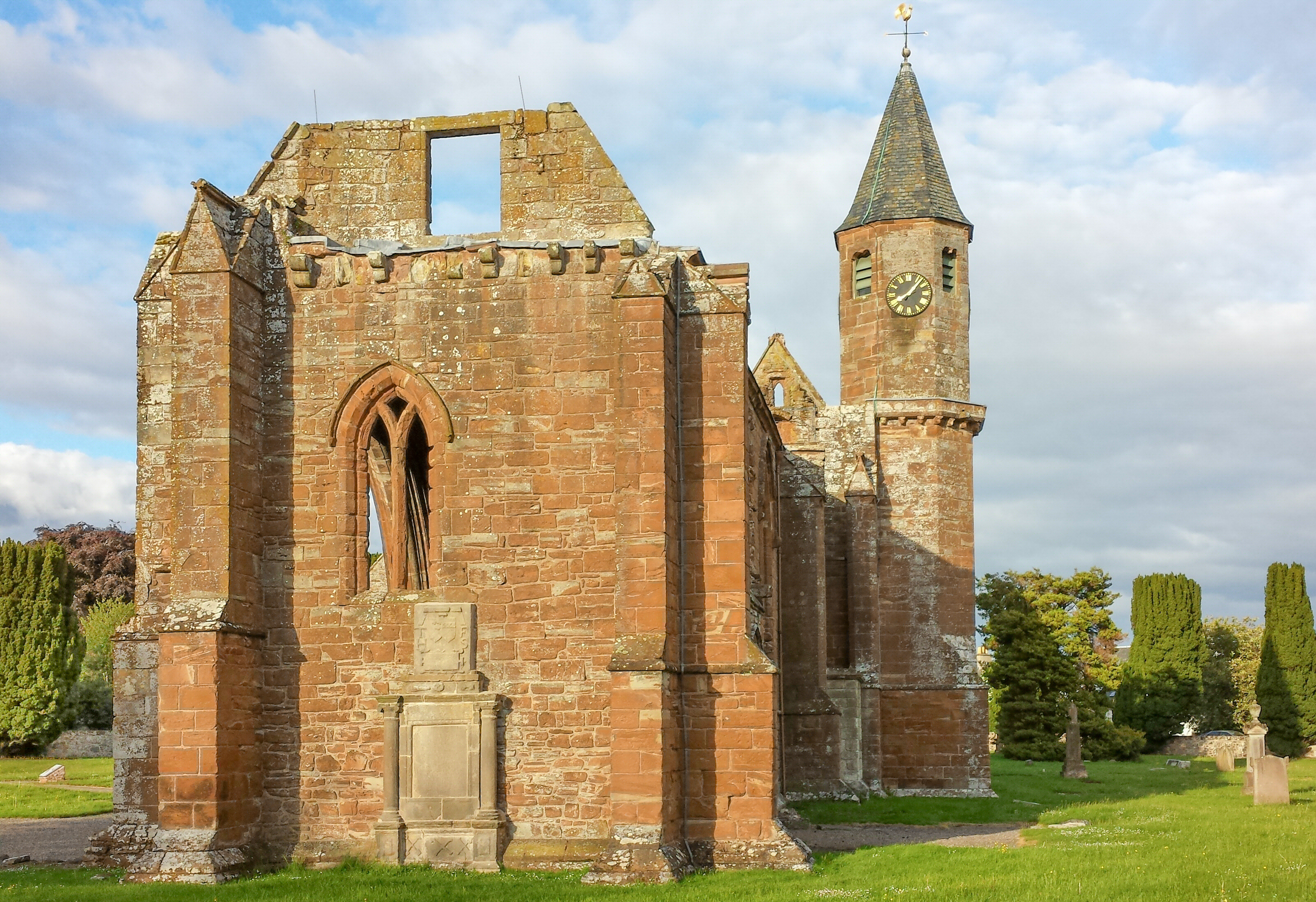
The cathedral from the west

The cathedral was constructed primarily of red sandstone. Two sections, the chapter house and the nave's south aisle, still stand on location. The outline of the remainder of the cathedral complex was revealed by excavations in 1873. The cathedral building appears to have begun, probably in the early-to-mid-13th century, as an "extended rectangle" with a tower in the north-west, and a chapter house and sacristy north of the choir.

The south-eastern chapel, aisle and porch were commissioned by Euphemia I, Countess of Ross in the late 14th century, but likely replaced an earlier building. These parts of the cathedral resemble work at Elgin Cathedral from the same period, something that can be attributed to the fact that its bishop Alexander de Kylwos had earlier been Dean of Moray.

== Notable burials ==
The south aisle, which contains two distinct chapels, has several burials. The eastern chapel is thought to contain burials of Countess Euphemia and Bishop Robert Cairncross. The tomb in the western chapel is, reputedly, Bishop John Fraser. Alexander of Islay, Earl of Ross and Lord of the Isles, was buried in the cathedral, but the location is not known. On the ceiling of the western chapel there are two heraldic bosses, representing Earl Alexander and Bishop John Bulloch.

According to 19th-century historian Alexander Mackenzie, many of the early chiefs of the Clan Munro were buried in the "Cathedral Church of Chanonry", which was the burial place of the family for over 400 years. Those mentioned by Mackenzie as buried there are Robert Munro, 2nd Baron of Foulis (d.1164), Donald Munro, 3rd Baron of Foulis (d.1192), Robert Munro, 4th Baron of Foulis (d.1239), Hugh Munro, 9th Baron of Foulis (d.1425), John Munro, 11th Baron of Foulis (d.1490), and Hector Munro, 13th Baron of Foulis (d.1541).

== Decline ==
After the Scottish Reformation it continued to be used as a church for the town. Lord Ruthven was granted the lead from the roof to sell in June 1572. It began to fall apart in the later 16th and early 17th century, though the sacristy and chapter house were still used for local gatherings of officials in the 18th century. Like other Scottish ex-cathedrals, its grounds remained in use as a graveyard. The government took over responsibility for its care in 1851 and it is now a scheduled monument.
