= Symeon of Rosemarkie =

Symeon (Simón)
- Bishop of Ross
- Church: Roman Catholic Church
- See: Diocese of Ross
- In office: 1127 × 1151 – 1155 × 1161
- Predecessor: Mac Bethad
- Successor: Gregoir

Personal details
- Born: unknown unknown
- Died: 1155 x

Symeon (Middle Gaelic: Simón; fl. 1147 – 1155) is the second known Bishop of Ross in the 12th century. His predecessor Mac Bethad occurred as bishop in a document datable between 1127 and 1131.

Symeon appeared for the first time when he witnessed a charter by King David I of Scotland granting Nithbren and Balcristin to Dunfermline Abbey. This is the only extant charter witnessed by Bishop Symeon. This charter is also witnessed by Alwin, Abbot of Holyrood (Alwyno abbate de Edenb.,), who had resigned his abbacy in 1151, and by Herbert, Bishop of Glasgow, who was consecrated as bishop at Auxerre on 24 August 1147, meaning that the charter was issued and witnessed between these two dates.

A "S. Bishop of St Peter in Ross" was addressed by Pope Adrian IV in a Papal Bull issued on 25 February 1155. His date of death is not known, but fell between that date in 1155 and 1161, when his successor Gregoir was consecrated as bishop.

== Notes ==
Catholic Church titles
Preceded by Mac Bethad	Bishop of Ross; 1127 × 1151 – 1155 × 1161	Succeeded by Gregoir
