= Henry Cockburn (bishop) =

Scottish bishop (died 1476)

- Bishop of Ross
- Church: Roman Catholic Church
- See: Diocese of Ross
- In office: 1461–1476
- Predecessor: Thomas de Tulloch
- Successor: John Woodman

Personal details
- Born: unknown unknown
- Died: 22 July 1476 – 20 August 1476

Henry Cockburn (died 1476) was a 15th-century Scottish prelate. Between 1461 and 1476, he was the Bishop of Ross.

On 23 March 1461 he received papal provision to the bishopric of Ross vacant by, presumably, the death of Thomas de Tulloch. He was consecrated sometime between 19 October 1463, when his name occurred in a Dunfermline Abbey document as bishop "elect and confirmed", and 16 August 1464, when he witnessed a royal charter as consecrated bishop.

He was at Arbroath Abbey when Richard Guthrie was elected Abbot of Arbroath on 3 November 1470. Bishop Cockburn was sent as part of an embassy to the Kingdom of England in 1473. He was in attendance at the Edinburgh parliament of 15 July 1476, and witnessed a royal charter on 22 July.

The episcopal see of Ross was vacant by 20 August, suggesting that Bishop Cockburn had died at some stage between 22 July or 20 August and although resignation or demotion is a possibility, there is no evidence pointing to such a highly unusual and notable occurrence.

Henry Cockburn, as a cleric and prelate, was forbidden from marriage, but he is known to have had at least one son, John Cockburn; John was legitimised on 20 September 1507.

== Notes ==
Religious titles
Preceded by Thomas de Tulloch	Bishop of Ross; 1461–1476	Succeeded by John Woodman
