= Thomas Hay (bishop) =

Thomas William Hay
- Bishop of Ross
- Church: Roman Catholic Church
- See: Diocese of Ross
- In office: 1483–1488 × 1492
- Predecessor: William Elphinstone
- Successor: John Guthrie

Personal details
- Born: unknown unknown
- Died: 1488 × 1492 ?

Thomas Hay was a 15th-century Scottish prelate. A canon of the diocese and cathedral of Aberdeen, on the translation of William Elphinstone from Bishop of Ross to Bishop of Aberdeen, Hay was provided as Elphinstone's successor in Ross, this occurring on 16 May 1483. He was probably the Thomas Hay who held the Aberdeen prebend of Turriff.

It was Bishop Hay who, on 12 September 1487, with the consent of the cathedral chapter of Fortrose and at the request of King James III of Scotland, erected the church of St Duthac at Tain into a collegiate church, "for the increase of the divine worship of the chapel or collegiate church of the blessed confessor Duthac of Tain".

The new church consisted of and was to support one provost, two deacons or sub-deacons, a sacrist, an assistant sacrist, and three child choristers; the five prebendary canonries were to be Cambuscurry, Dunskeath, Morangie, Newmore and Tarlogie. The erection was confirmed under the Great Seal of Scotland on 3 December, and was confirmed by Pope Innocent VIII in 1492.

Bishop Hay was at parliament on 11 January 1488, his last appearance in any contemporary sources. Hay's episcopate therefore lasted until at least 1488; it did not last beyond early 1492, the latest possible date for the appearance of John Guthrie as his successor; it is unclear if Bishop Hay died, or if he resigned, or if got demoted, though death is the most likely.

== Notes ==
Religious titles
Preceded by William Elphinstone	Bishop of Ross; 1483–1488 × 1492	Succeeded by John Guthrie
