= Robert II (bishop of Ross) =

Robert (II.)
- Bishop of Ross
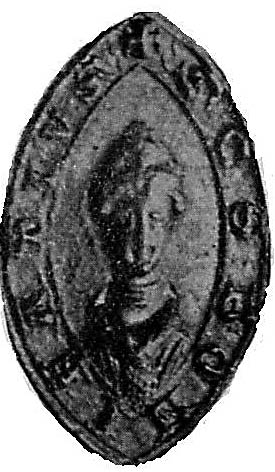
- Bishop Robert's seal
- Church: Roman Catholic Church
- See: Diocese of Ross
- In office: 1249 × 1250–1271
- Predecessor: Robert (I.)
- Successor: Matthew
- Previous post(s): Archdeacon of Ross (×1223–1249×1250)

Orders
- Consecration: 21 June 1249 × 20 June 1250

Personal details
- Born: unknown unknown
- Died: c. 1271

Robert (died c. 1271) was a 13th-century prelate based in the Kingdom of Scotland. He was successively Archdeacon of Ross and Bishop of Ross; he is the second Robert to have held the bishopric of Ross.

Robert can be found as Archdeacon of Ross as early as 6 July 1223, when his name occurred in a document relating to Durham Cathedral; it is not known how long he had been holding that position in 1223, but he is the first known Archdeacon of the diocese.

He probably became Bishop of Ross sometime in 1249; he was consecrated sometime between 21 June 1249 and 20 June 1250.

Turner interpreted a papal mandate of 1256 as sanctioning the increase in the number of canons in the cathedral chapter and authorising the relocation of the cathedral [from Rosemarkie] to Fortrose. Cowan and Easson thought that the cathedral had always been located at Fortrose, but it was simply called Rosemarkie.

Bishop Robert appears, from the evidence of Walter Bower (using an earlier source), to have died in the year 1271. Walter Bower confuses the man who died that year and the builder of the new cathedral with Robert II's predecessor, Robert I.

== Notes ==
Religious titles
Preceded by None known	Archdeacon of Ross × 1223–1249 × 1250	Succeeded by Robert de Fyvie
Preceded by Robert Capellanus	Bishop of Ross; 1249 × 1250–1271	Succeeded by Matthew
