= John Fraser (bishop) =

- Bishop of Ross
- Church: Roman Catholic Church
- See: Diocese of Ross
- In office: 1497–1507
- Predecessor: John Guthrie
- Successor: Robert Cockburn
- Previous post(s): Provost of Abernethy (×1476–1489×1499); Dean of Restalrig ( 1487–1498)

Orders
- Consecration: By 3 January 1499

Personal details
- Born: unknown unknown
- Died: 1507

John Fraser [also, more commonly then, Frisel or Frisell] (died 1507) was a late medieval Scottish prelate. Born about 1429, or 1430 if later tradition can be believed, with strong connections to the burgh of Linlithgow, Fraser held a variety of high-level ecclesiastical positions in Scotland, including being the first Dean of Restalrig collegiate church (which he helped to found) before becoming Bishop of Ross in 1497, a position he held until his death in 1507.

== Early career ==
Fraser was a university graduate, M. A., and he seems to have been the John Fraser who was Dean of the Faculty of Arts at the University of St Andrews in 1479. He is found as Provost of the collegiate church of Abernethy on 2 February 1476; it is not known when he obtained this position, and the latest documentation of a previous provost occurs all the way back on 13 March 1445. He can be found as the Official of the diocese of Dunblane on 26 August 1476. He was litigating to gain the precentorship of Elgin Cathedral in 1480, although nothing more of this is heard. He is found as rector of the parish church of Douglas on 28 August 1481. After the election of Robert Blackadder as Bishop of Aberdeen on 14 July 1480, Fraser received provision to the now vacant position of Archdeacon of Aberdeen; he did not secure the position because of the lack of royal support, but was still claiming the position in 1488.

== Collegiate church of Restalrig ==
Fraser was the first Dean of the new collegiate church erected on 13 November 1487 at Restalrig in Midlothian. Fraser petitioned the pope for the creation of the collegiate church on 6 May, to be dedicated to the "Holy and Indivisible Trinity" and the Virgin Mary; the church had and was benefiting from the patronage of King James III of Scotland, and the church was called at the time the "King's chapel" or "chapel royal". Fraser founded a chaplaincy in the new collegiate church, to which he donated a tenement he had built in the Canongate.

== Bishop of Ross ==
In the 1490s, Fraser became a royal councillor and Clerk of the Register. Some time before 10 September 1497, Fraser was elected through royal influence to the bishopric of Ross, vacant at least three, possibly five years, since the death of the previous bishop, John Guthrie. He received papal provision on 14 March 1498. On 5 May, the Florentine clerk Ilarion de Portiis acting in Fraser's name paid the papacy 600 gold florins. His name appeared in Scottish sources datable to 3 December as "elect and confirmed of Ross." He was granted the temporalities of the bishopric on 3 January 1499, by which time he had probably received consecration.

On 10 March 1504, Bishop Fraser was present at a meeting of the parliament; on 10 May, he is recorded as granting his cathedral at Fortrose an annual rent of £10 from a tenement he owned in the burgh of Linlithgow. On 15 September 1506, King James IV of Scotland, while at the Chanonry of Ross, granted to the bishop part of the lands of the toun of Arkbol, in the earldom of Ross. The History of the Frazers (Wardlaw MS) claimed that he died on 5 February 1507, aged 78. According to tradition one of the three funeral effigies in Fortrose Cathedral is that of Bishop Fraser. The tradition – attested in the Wardlaw MS History of the Frazers – that he was Abbot of Melrose and Prior of Beauly is now thought to be spurious. Professor Donald Watt omitted him from his list of chancellors of Glasgow Cathedral, a position he was also widely believed to have held.

== Notes ==
Religious titles
Unknown Title last held by James Dalrymple	Provost of Abernethy ×1476–1489×1499	Unknown Title next held by George Clerk
New title	Dean of Restalrig; 1487–1498	Succeeded by Henry Wood
Preceded by John Guthrie	Bishop of Ross; 1497–1507	Succeeded by Robert Cockburn
