= John Woodman =

Scottish bishop

- Bishop of Ross
- Church: Roman Catholic Church
- See: Diocese of Ross
- In office: 1476–1480 × 1481
- Predecessor: Henry Cockburn
- Successor: William Elphinstone
- Previous post: Abbot of Jedburgh (1468–1478)

Orders
- Consecration: unknown

Personal details
- Born: unknown unknown
- Died: Before 3 August 1481

John Woodman [Wodman] (d. 1480 × 1481) was a 15th-century churchman based in the Kingdom of Scotland. Woodman was a canon of the diocese of St Andrews, and as such was locally made Prior of Pittenweem on the death of the previous prior, James Kennedy, Bishop of St Andrews; however, he was opposed by one Walter Monypenny, while the new bishop, Patrick Graham, desired the position for himself. Woodman had lost litigation for this post to Monypenny by 17 September 1466, and possession to the bishop, though Woodman was still claiming this priory as late as 1477 when he became Bishop of Ross.

Some time after November 1465, he was collated as Prior of Restenneth by Bishop Patrick Graham, which involved him in unsuccessful litigation against the sitting prior James Dunmain. In 1468, while still litigating with Dunmain in the papal curia, he was provided as Abbot of Jedburgh. The death of the previous abbot Andrew Bolton led the Bishop of Glasgow to try to imposed Robert Turnbull as abbot, but it was Woodman who secured papal provision.

Woodman was provided to the bishopric of Ross sometime before 20 August 1476, but after 22 July. He occurs as Bishop-elect on 17 August 1477, and on 16 October made a payment to the papacy of 321 gold florins through Nicholas de Rabatis and Rayner de Ricolis. He occurs again as Bishop-elect of Ross (though unnamed) on 4 May 1478. Woodman was in the archdiocese of York in 1480, allegedly acting as a suffragan, though this may be doubtful. We have no knowledge of his consecration, and his successor William Elphinstone was provided to the (now vacant) bishopric of Ross on 3 August 1481 following the death of Woodman, though it is not possible to date Woodman's death more narrowly than either 1480 or 1481.

== Notes ==
Religious titles
| Preceded by Andrew Bolton | Abbot of Jedburgh; 1468–1478 | Succeeded by Robert Turnbull |
| Preceded by Henry Cockburn | Bishop of Ross; 1476–1480 × 1481 | Succeeded by William Elphinstone |
