= Alexander de Kylwos =

Scottish churchman and prelate

- Bishop of Ross
- Church: Roman Catholic Church
- See: Diocese of Ross
- In office: 1371–1398
- Predecessor: Alexander Stewart
- Successor: Alexander de Waghorn
- Previous posts: Chancellor of Ross (1333 × 1350–1350); Dean of Ross (1350–1368 × 1370); Dean of Moray (1368 × 1370–1371)

Orders
- Consecration: 9 May 1371 × 6 March 1372

Personal details
- Born: unknown unknown
- Died: 6 July 1398

Alexander de Kylwos (died 1398) – written alternatively as Frylquhous, Kylquos, and a variety of other forms – was a Scottish churchman and prelate active in the second half of the 14th century. He is known to have held senior positions in three bishoprics, and senior offices in two, before being elected and appointed Bishop of Ross in 1371. Though his episcopate is relatively obscure, he seems to have spent almost all of it inside or around his province, was closely associated with William III and Euphemia I, successive rulers of Ross, and was an associate of the famous Alexander Bur, Bishop of Moray, during the latter's struggle with Alexander Stewart, the son of the King later known by the nickname "Wolf of Badenoch".

== Early life ==
He may take his name from Kilwhiss near Auchtermuchty in Fife. His family is obscure, but it is known that during his time as Bishop of Ross, probably in the 1390s, he brought one John de Kylwos – clearly a relative – into his diocese, as the Subdean. Alexander was certainly born in or more likely a good period before the year 1326, because he is known to have been a priest in 1350, the minimum age for which was 24 years old.

Kylwos' first appearance in history occurred on 30 April 1350, when he added his seal to a charter of William III, Earl of Ross; here he is the elect Dean of the Ross. On this date Alexander was styled "Master", indicating that he had already completed many years of university education, though when and where is a mystery.

The papal confirmation for his election to the deanery, dated 9 September, indicates that he had previously been the Chancellor of the diocese of Ross; it is not known how long he had held the chancellorship of the diocese, and unfortunately no previous chancellor can be traced later than 1333.

Alexander's next appearance is on 18 September 1357, at Rosemarkie, when he was appointed as the proctor of the Ross cathedral chapter responsible for ensuring the payment of their contribution to the ransom of King David II of Scotland. At some point between June 1361 and August 1362 he is found fulfilling some arrears to King David's Chamberlain on account of the ransom.

On 13 December 1366, he was attending a statute-passing meeting of the chapter of Aberdeen Cathedral, and here it becomes known that he held a canonry and prebend in the diocese of Aberdeen.

He attended the parliament at Scone on 27 September 1367, as proctor of Alexander Stewart, Bishop of Ross, and remained behind as part of a small representative committee elected to finish off some parliamentary business. By December 1368, he was the papal chamber's sub-collector in Scotland, deputising to William de Greenlaw, Archdeacon of St Andrews.

On 7 December 1368 he was provided as Dean of Moray, and instructed to resign the deanery of Ross and his Aberdeen canonry upon obtaining possession. For some reason, perhaps because of administrative confusion, on 11 December the papacy also provided one Thomas de Harcars to the deanery of Moray, but it is Kylwos alone who obtained possession, being found in such by 19 December 1370.

== Bishop of Ross ==
On 9 May 1371, Alexander was given papal provision to the bishopric of Ross following the death of Bishop Alexander Stewart. Alexander Steward is found to have been alive for the last time on 4 February though the date of his death afterwards is unknown. The letter of provision by Pope Gregory IX was addressed to Kylwos as "elect of Ross", and describes how following Bishop Stewart's wish the chapter of Ross had elected Kylwos in ignorance of the pope's previous reservation of the see; the election was declared void, but on account of the chapter's expressed will he nevertheless provided Kylwos to the see.

It is probable that he did travel to Avignon to obtain this confirmation of his election and to receive consecration, as no Bishop of Ross was available to attend the coronation of Robert II at Scone and following parliament on 27 March. He is first known to have been a consecrated bishop on 6 March 1372, though no document records the date on which his consecration took place. A promise of his "services" was made on 22 May 1371, part of which were paid through William de Greenlaw, acting as proctor, on 2 September 1372; another part was paid on 15 April 1374, this time through Adam de Tyninghame, future Bishop of Aberdeen.

Kylwos was back in Scotland in 1372, attending Robert II's Scone parliament of 6 March, and then the Scone parliament of 3/4 April 1373. Kylwos was afterwards very little involved in national affairs, largely confining himself to activities which concerned Ross and his diocese there; thus, despite being bishop for a quarter of a century, documentation of his episcopate is weak.

He is found witnessing a Moray Registrum charter at Nigg on 21 October 1375. A papal mandate of 3 October 1379 mentions a dispute between Bishop Alexander and one of his canons, John de Carralle, authorising the dispute to be settled by the Bishop of Moray. The dispute also involved the Bishop of St Andrews, William de Landallis, two priests, and two laymen from the diocese of St Andrews and the diocese of Brechin; the dispute involved revenues from the prebend of Colyroden (i.e. Cullicudden) in Ross and the church of Mockard (i.e. Muckhart) in St Andrews dioceses, though the exact details at issue are not revealed.

He witnessed a charter of Euphemia I, Countess of Ross and her husband Walter Leslie at Tain on 26 November 1380, another at Elgin on 18 August 1381, and yet another at Dingwall in March 1382. On 7 February 1382, he was at Montrose in Angus and is recorded, along with Alexander Bur, Bishop of Moray, adding his seal to a document which transferred the lands of Abernethy, Strathspey, into the hands of Alexander Stewart, Lord of Badenoch and Earl of Buchan.

He is found again over seven years later, at Inverness, on 27 October 1389, witnessing a settlement between Alexander Bur and the titular Earl of Moray, John de Dunbar. He is found once more with Alexander Bur, on 2 November that year, commanding Alexander Stewart, Earl of Buchan, to take back Euphemia, to whom Stewart had been nominally married. He was at Scone on 2 December 1390, on Bur's behalf demanding that King Robert III deliver justice after Buchan had burned down Elgin Cathedral, the seat of Bur's Moray bishopric.

The remainder of Kylwos' last decade as Bishop of Ross is obscure. He is mentioned in a papal mandate, dated 31 March 1396, in relation to his grant of the subdeanery to John de Kylwos. According to the Calendar of Fearn, he died on 6 July 1398. The bishopric of Ross was said to have been reserved, once again, as a papal benefice during Kylwos' episcopate.

== Notes ==
Religious titles
| Preceded by William de Lindores | Chancellor of Ross; 1333 × 1350–1350 | Succeeded by Hohn de Arbroath |
| Preceded by John de Kinkell | Dean of Ross; 1350–1368 × 1370 | Succeeded by John Reid |
| Preceded by William de Pilmuir | Dean of Moray; 1368 × 1370–1371 | Succeeded by Robert de Sinclair |
| Preceded by Alexander Stewart | Bishop of Ross; 1371–1398 | Succeeded by Alexander de Waghorn |
