= Alan de St Edmund =

13th-century Scottish bishop

- Bishop of Caithness
- Church: Roman Catholic Church
- See: Diocese of Caithness
- In office: 1282–1291
- Predecessor: Hervey de Dundee
- Successor: John (unconsecrated); Adam de Darlington

Orders
- Consecration: 13 April 1282

Personal details
- Born: early or mid-1200s England
- Died: November/December 1291

Alan de St Edmund was a 13th-century English cleric and administrator of the Roman Catholic Church. His name suggests a connection with Bury St. Edmunds Abbey in Suffolk, but there is no direct evidence. He was the chaplain of Hugh of Evesham, another Englishman, from the diocese of Worcester, who in 1282 was made Presbyter-Cardinal of St Laurence in Lucina by Pope Martin IV. After Hervey de Dundee, bishop-elect of Caithness, died while seeking confirmation at the Roman curia, the pope chose Alan - still in Rome - for the bishopric. Alan was provided by Pope Martin on 13 April 1282.

For the remainder of the 1280s his activities are largely obscure. After the death of King Alexander III of Scotland, Alan was one of the figures who pushed for a marriage between Alexander's granddaughter and heiress Margaret, Maid of Norway and Edward of Caernarfon, heir to King Edward I of England. He was one of the three men appointed to negotiate the marriage, the other two being Robert Wishart, Bishop of Glasgow, and John Comyn, Lord of Badenoch.

Although the deal was made, Margaret's death in 1290 put an end to this plan, and the ensuing succession debate was mediated by King Edward, now temporary ruler of Scotland. King Edward showed his fellow Englishman Alan favour, and on 12 June 1291, appointed him Chancellor of Scotland and handed over to him the Seal of Regency. Edward provided one of his own clerks, Walter de Agsmundesham, as an assistant, and ordered the Chamberlain Alexander de Balliol to pay every month to Bishop Alan 20 merks and to Agsmundesham 10 merks. On 26 October Edward ordered that 40 pieces of oak be provided to Alan from the forest of Ternaway in Moray to be used in Dornoch Cathedral.

Bishop Alan, however, was dead by 12 December, and is last attested on 5 November. King Edward, in honour of Alan's services, ordered that all Alan's bona et catalla, goods and chattels, which Edward was entitled to by Scottish custom, be delivered to the Prior of Coldingham; Henry de Horncastre—and to Alan's brother Adam de St Edmund, who was parson of the church of Restalrig.

== Notes ==
Religious titles
Preceded by Hervey de Dundee	Bishop of Caithness; 1282–1291	Succeeded by John (unconsecrated); Adam de Darlington
