= John Guthrie (bishop of Ross) =

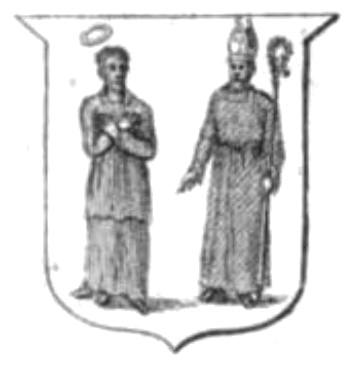
Early modern sketch of the arms of the bishops of Ross.

John Guthrie was a 15th-century Scottish bishop, who was sometime Bishop of Ross, an office based at Fortrose on the Black Isle in Ross.

He received papal provision to the vacant bishopric of Ross by papal bull on 11 April 1492, his proctor paying the papacy the 600 gold florins on 14 June. Earlier, at some point between 12 May 1490, and 26 February 1492, he had been admitted to the temporalities of that episcopal see, presumably as bishop-elect.

One early modern authority who may have seen lost sources claimed that Guthrie had died before July 1494, though no successor to the dioceseis known until 10 September 1497.

== Notes ==
Religious titles
Preceded by Thomas Hay	Bishop of Ross; 1490×1492–1492×1497 (1492–1494?)	Succeeded by John Fraser
