= Alexander Hepburn =

Scottish cleric (died 1578)

Alexander Hepburn (died 1578) was a 16th-century Scottish cleric who served as Protestant Bishop of Ross.

== Life ==
He is first mentioned as minister of Little Dunkeld in 1574.

He was elected as bishop of Ross on 14 May 1574, following the Church of Scotland's attempted forfeiture of the Catholic bishop John Lesley.

Hepburn obtained a royal confirmation with mandate for consecration on 20 March 1575, being admitted to the temporalities of the bishopric on 3 November; in the same year, on 22 April, the exiled Lesley had his provision renewed by the papacy. He was consecrated at Holyrood House in April 1576. Hepburn died on 22 September 1578.

== Family ==
He married Christian Scrimgeour of Fordin and had a son, James Hepburn.

== Aftermath ==
No new bishop of Ross was appointed until 1600, though Lesley was temporarily recognised by the secessionist Scottish church in the period between 13 March 1587, and 29 May 1589, while the famous Lesley had retained international recognition for his episcopate all the way from his accession in 1566 until his translation bishopric of Coutances in 1592.

== Notes ==
Religious titles
Preceded by John Lesley	Bishop of Ross; 1574–1578; Opposed by: John Lesley	Succeeded by John Lesley
