= Abbot of Jedburgh =

The Abbot of Jedburgh (previously Prior of Jedburgh, later Commendator of Jedburgh) was the head of the Augustinian canons of Jedburgh Abbey, Roxburghshire. It was founded by King David I of Scotland in 1138, and David's grandson and successor Máel Coluim IV ensured its promotion to the status of abbey before 1156. The position was secularized in the 16th century, and in 1606 turned into a secular lordship for the last commendator, Alexander Home, now earl of Home.

The following is a list of priors, abbots and commendators:

== List of priors ==
- Daniel, fl. 1139
- Osbert, 1153x1156-1174

== List of abbots ==
- Osbert (same), 1153 x 1156-1174
- Richard, 1174-1192
- Radulf, 1192-1205
- Hugh, 1205-1209x1211
- Peter, 1220
- Henry, 1239
- Philip, 1239-1249
- Robert de Gyseburne, 1249
- Nicholas de Prenderlathe, 1249–1275.
- John Morel, 1275–1296, 1299 ?
- William de Jarum, 1296-1319
- Robert Marshal, 1319-1332
- John de Eskdale, 1338-1354
- Robert, 1358-1392
- John de Dryden, 1408
- Thomas de Eskdale, 1411
- Walter Pyle, 1422-1455
- John de Bolden, 1426
- Andrew Bontoun (or Bolton), 1463-1464 x 1468
- John Woodman, 1468-1476
- Robert Turnbull, 1476-1478
- John Hall, 1478-1479
- William Forester, 1480/81-1484
- Hugh Douglas, 1482
- Robert Archison (Atkinson), 1483-1488
- Thomas Cranston, 1484-1501
- Robert Blackadder, 1484, 1502-1505
- Henry Alanson, 1505-1512
- John Lynne (or John Home), 1512-1549

== List of commendators ==
- Andrew Home, 1547-1593
- Alexander Home, 1597-1606

== Bibliography ==
- Watt, D.E.R., Fasti Ecclesiae Scotinanae Medii Aevi ad annum 1638, 2nd Draft, (St Andrews, 1969), p. 92
- Watt, D.E.R. & Shead, N.F. (eds.), The Heads of Religious Houses in Scotland from the 12th to the 16th Centuries, The Scottish Records Society, New Series, Volume 24, (Edinburgh, 2001), pp. 116–20

== See also ==
- Earl of Home
- Jedburgh Abbey
