= Hugh of Evesham =

English churchman, physician and alchemist

Hugh of Evesham (died 1287) was a 13th-century English churchman, physician and alchemist. Given his name, it is likely that he came from Evesham, Worcestershire.

== University career ==
Hugh studied at Oxford University in the 1260s. At some point in his student career he became friends with John Peckham, future Archbishop of Canterbury. According to the manuscript of John Bale's mid-16th century Index Britanniae Scriptorum), he was a Doctor of Medicine and the author of Quaestiones on Isaac's liber febrium. In 1269, Master Hugh of Evesham was one of the professors at Oxford who became drawn into the controversy between the Dominicans and Franciscans. By 1275 Master Hugh was Archdeacon of Worcester, and on 9 June 1275, Archdeacon Hugh was granted permission by Bishop Gifford to go to "parts beyond the sea" for the purpose of study. This meant that he went to study in Continental Europe. On 16 September 1275, however, Hugh was still in the Diocese of Worcester, for he received a mandate from the Bishop to proclaim the forthcoming ceremony of purgation of a criminal of his crime.

== Royal Clerk and Diocese of York ==
By the early 1270s he was working as a royal clerk, giving his services to King Edward I of England. By the end of the decade he had gained a wide reputation as a great physician. Hugh gained many benefices in the diocese of York, and in 1279 was involved in the election of a successor to Archbishop Walter Gifford. He is the "Magister Hugo de Ewesan", canon of York, who participated in the election of William de Wickwane, Chancellor of York, as Archbishop of York, on 22 June 1279. Chancellor William, who received all the votes except his own, voted for Hugh. On 17 December 1279 Master Hugh of Evesham, Canon of York, was one of the examiners of candidates for ordination in the Diocese of York, on appointment of Archbishop Wickwane.

== Rome and a Cardinalate ==
Hugh and Archbishop Wickwane preserved their friendship, even after he went to Rome. On 12 September 1280 Archbishop Wickwane named Master Hugh of Evesham, Canon of York, and Stephen Patringtone his proctors at the Papal Curia, and so notified Cardinals Giacomo Savelli and Matteo Rosso Orsini In 1282 he was asked to assist the Archbishop in disputes with the Archbishop of Canterbury and the Bishop of Durham.

While at Rome, he probably became a personal physician to Pope Martin IV and was entrusted with finding a cure to an epidemic that was then current in the city of Rome. He seems to have become friends with another English physician at Rome, Cardinal John of Toledo. Hugh became a successful Papal courtier and received a numerous rewards. On 12 April 1281 he was made a Cardinal-Priest with the title of San Lorenzo in Lucina - and his chaplain, Alan de St Edmund, was made Bishop of Caithness after the bishop-elect, Hervey de Dundee, died at Rome while seeking Papal confirmation.

== Conclave of 1285 ==
Cardinal Hugh participated in the conclave of 1–2 April 1285, at Perugia, where he had found refuge after being driven out of Orvieto. In the Conclave Cardinal Giacomo Savelli, Cardinal Deacon of S. Maria in Cosmedin, was elected on the first ballot. He took the name Honorius IV. When Honorius IV died on Holy Thursday, 3 April 1287, Cardinal Hugh was one of the thirteen cardinals who participated in the Conclave, which took place in Rome at the papal residence near Santa Sabina on the Aventine Hill. He was the senior cardinal-priest. The Conclave opened in April, but the cardinals had one difficulty after another. The plague broke out in the Conclave, and a number of cardinals died; the rest retreated for a time to their private residences. Six cardinals, the sources say, died in 1287. One of them was Cardinal Hugh. The survivors finally elected a new pope on 22 February 1288, Cardinal Girolamo Masci d' Ascoli, OFM, the Bishop of Palestrina, who took the name Nicholas IV.

== Death ==
Cardinal Hugh had lived at Orvieto, Perugia and Rome during the last years of his life, following the Pope and the Roman Curia, of which he was a leading member. He prepared his Last Will and Testament on 15 November 1286. At the time of his death, according to his Will, he was also possessed of the parishes of Goxhill and Spofforth. He died on 27 July 1287 He was buried in his church at San Lorenzo in Lucina. Hugh composed a number of writings on alchemy and medicine, many of which survive, many of which appear alongside writings by John of Toledo. The two were regarded as a pair, Hugh being nicknamed the "Black Cardinal" and John the "White Cardinal."

== Sources ==
- Dowden, John, The Bishops of Scotland, ed. J. Maitland Thomson, (Glasgow, 1912)
- Faye Getz, "2004 Evesham, Hugh of (d. 1287)", in the Oxford Dictionary of National Biography, Oxford University Press, 2004, accessed 20 Feb 2007]
