= Archdeacon of Caithness =

The Archdeacon of Caithness was the only archdeacon in the Diocese of Caithness, acting as a deputy of the Bishop of Caithness. The following is a list of known historical archdeacons:

== List of archdeacons of Caithness ==
- John, fl. 1296
- Fercard Belegaumbe, fl. 1297-1304 x
- Andrew de Hirdmaniston, fl. 1328–1329
- John Todd, fl. 1329
- William de Forres, fl. 1355
- John de Lancford, 1358
- John de Moray, fl. 1365
- William Forrester, fl. 1382
- John de Innes, fl. 1396–1398
- Alexander Vaus, 1398-x 1407
- Alexander Barber, 1407-1419 x 1421
- Thomas de Greenlaw, 1414-1419 x 1428
- Nicholas Tunnok, 1421–1422
- Thomas Duncan, 1426
- Thomas Tulloch, 1428-1437
- James Bruce, 1437
- Laurence Piot, 1437-1440
- Alexander Rattray, 1438-1440 x 1443
- Alexander Lichton, 1440
- David Reid, 1440
- David Stewart, 1440
- James Innes, 1440–1442
- Richard Dor, 1441
- William Sutherland, 1443-1443 x 1445
- Richard Holland, 1443 x 1445–1448
- Alexander Sutherland, 1445–1477
- Hector Tulloch, 1445
- James Forrester, 1497–1498
- George Stewart, fl. 1512
- John Dingwall, 1516-1532 x 1533
- James Brady, 1525–1556
- William Gordon, 1529
- John Sinclair, 1550 x 1551-1574 x 1578
- Robert Innes, 1577–1581
- Zachary Pont, 1608
- Richard Merchiston, 1619-1626 x 1633

== Bibliography ==
- Watt, D.E.R., Fasti Ecclesiae Scotinanae Medii Aevi ad annum 1638, 2nd Draft, (St Andrews, 1969), pp. 70–3

== See also ==
- Bishop of Caithness
