= Mac Bethad of Rosemarkie =

Mac Bethad (fl. 1127 x 1131) is the first recorded High Medieval Bishop of Ross, a See then located at Rosemarkie.

He makes his only historical appearance as Macbeth Rosmarkensis Episcopus (i.e. "Mac Bethad, Bishop of Rosemarkie") in a list of witnesses to a charter granted by King David I of Scotland to the Church of Dunfermline, confirming the previous rights of that church.

The charter is dated by its modern editor to 1128, but is more safely dated to the period between the years 1127 and 1131.

== Notes ==
Religious titles
Preceded by ?	Bishop of Ross fl. 1127 x 1131	Succeeded by Symeon
