= Jedburgh Abbey =

Abbey in Scottish Borders, Scotland

- Thhe abbey from the south
- Interactive map of Jedburgh Abbey

Monastery information
- Full name: Jedburgh Abbey
- Order: Canons Regular of Saint Augustine
- Established: Ca. 1118
- Disestablished: 1560

People
- Founder: David I of Scotland

Site
- Location: Jedburgh, Scottish Borders, Scotland
- Coordinates: 55°28′34″N 2°33′13″W
- Visible remains: Extensive
- Public access: Yes

Jedburgh Abbey, a ruined Augustinian abbey which was founded in the 12th century, is situated in the town of Jedburgh, in the Scottish Borders, 10 miles (16 km) north of the border with England at Carter Bar.

== History ==
Towards the middle of the 9th century, when the area around Jedburgh was part of the Anglo-Saxon Kingdom of Northumbria, there were two Gedworths (as Jedburgh was then known). One of them became the Jedburgh we know now; the other was four miles to the south. According to Symeon of Durham, Ecgred, bishop of Lindisfarne from 830 to 845, gifted the two villages of the same name to the See of Lindisfarne. The southerly Gedworth was the place of Ecgred's church, the first church in the parish. The present town was distinguished from the long-disappeared south village by the phrase "UBI CASTELLUM EST", meaning, "where the castle is". The only solid evidence of Ecgred's church came from Symeon of Durham when he described the burial, at the church of Geddewerde, of Eadulf, one of the assassins of Walcher, Bishop of Durham. Over the years, Jedburgh has been described by 83 different names or spellings.

West door

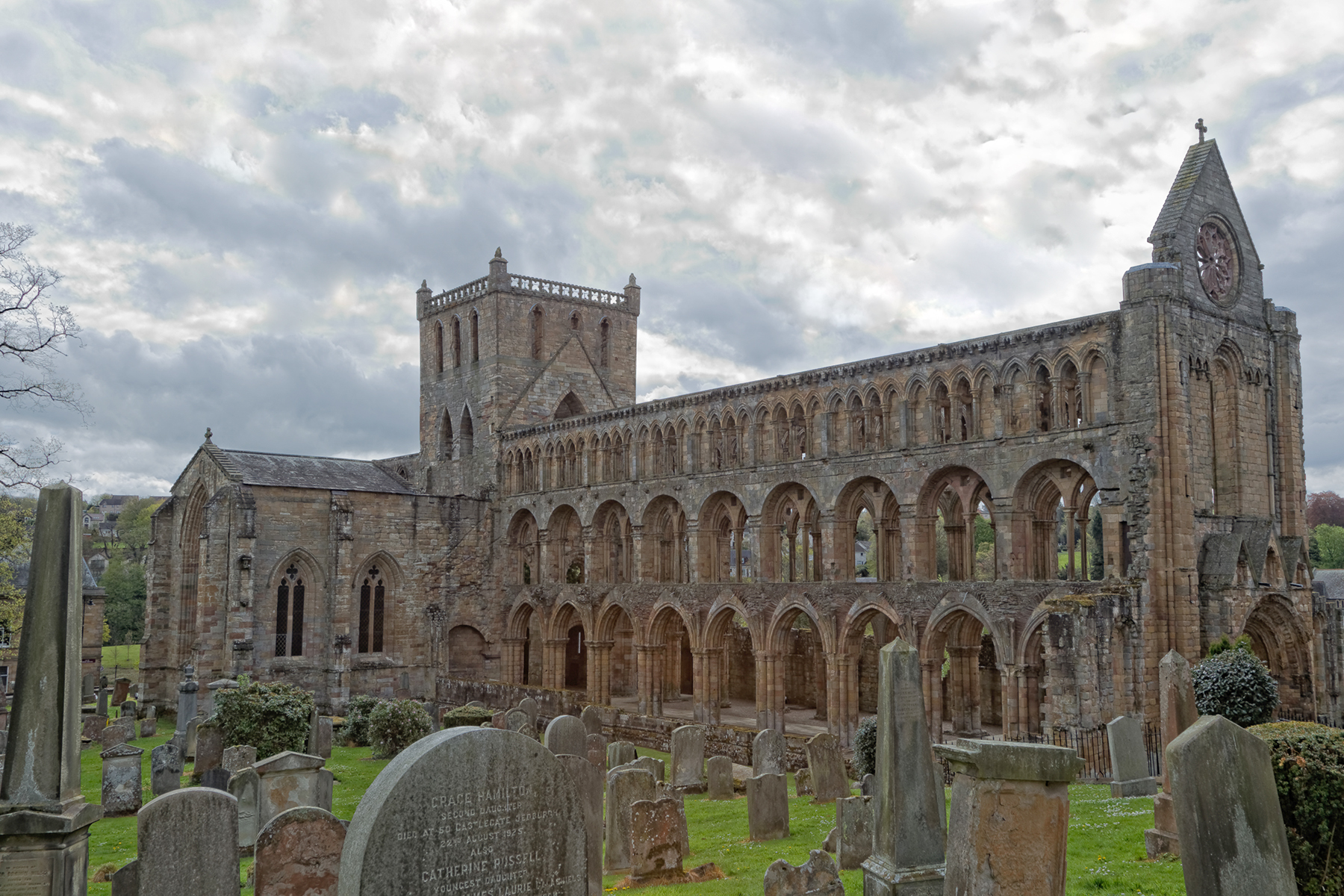
The church from the north-west

In 1118, prior to his accession to the Scottish throne, Prince David established a foundation of canons regular under the Rule of St Augustine at what is now Jedburgh. The foundation appeared to have the status of 'priory' in the early years, and a man by the name of Daniel was described as the Prior of Geddwrda in 1139. The foundation was raised to the rank of abbey prior to King David's death in 1153, probably in 1147, and was dedicated to the Virgin Mary.

Following the death of King David, the patronage and privileges of the abbey were accorded to his grandsons Malcolm IV of Scotland and William I of Scotland, also known as William the Lion. The king's son, Henry, had predeceased his father. The abbey church was built in the 12th and 13th centuries and was complete by the time Alexander III of Scotland married Yolande, daughter of the Comte de Dreux on 14 October 1285 at the church. Two re-used stones bearing Roman inscriptions were incorporated in the structure. The abbey church incorporates high-quality Norman and Early English Gothic architecture. The Norman choir includes a giant order, suggesting a possible architectural link to Romsey Abbey in England, while the nave is an elaborate early Gothic structure, with waterleaf capitals, a high tribune gallery and an arcaded clerestory.

The abbey grew in stature and the abbot was invited to attend Scottish Parliaments. As well as its lands and chapels in southern Scotland, Jedburgh Abbey owned great lands in Northumberland. In 1296, the Abbot of Jedburgh swore fealty to Edward I of England at Berwick-on-Tweed. Edward intended to rule the abbey and presented William de Jarum as the new Abbot of Jedburgh in 1296. After the defeat of the Earl of Surrey in 1297 at Stirling at the hands of William Wallace, the abbey was pillaged and wrecked by the English as retribution. Robert I of Scotland (The Bruce) continued to patronise the church during his reign in the early 14th century. In 1346, after the Scottish defeat at the Battle of Neville's Cross, the English once again slighted the church. Later that century, in 1370, David II of Scotland was instrumental in the completion of the large north transept. Jedburgh Grammar School was founded by the canons of Jedburgh Abbey in the late 15th century. The abbey faced more destruction in 1410, 1416 and by the Earl of Warwick in 1464. In 1523, the town and abbey were set ablaze by the Earl of Surrey. The abbey faced more indignity in 1544 at the hands of the Earl of Hertford, when the buildings were used as a fortress by French troops. Due to the persistent attacks, the buildings increasingly fell into ruin, with the canons retreating to makeshift accommodation in the crossing and transept of the church. The end finally came with the Scottish Reformation in 1560.

=== The Reformation and beyond ===
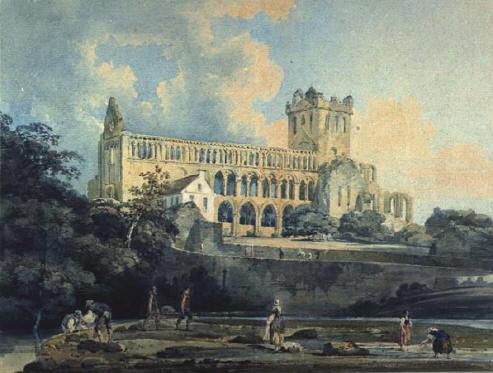
Jedburgh Abbey from the River (1798-99) by Thomas Girtin, showing the church as a romantic ruin. The parish kirk can be identified by the blocked arches to the left.

When the Protestant Reformation arrived in 1560, the canons were allowed to stay but the abbey was used as the parish kirk for the reformed religion. In 1671 the church was removed to the western part of the nave for safety reasons. This situation persisted until, in 1871, it was considered unsafe to continue worship at the abbey church and a new parish church was built. The Marquis of Lothian immediately started work on the conservation of the great church but in 1917 the church was handed over to the state and is now in the care of Historic Environment Scotland as a scheduled monument.

== Burials ==
- Eadulf Rus
- John Capellanus - Bishop of Glasgow
- Hugh de Roxburgh - Bishop of Glasgow
- Thomas Kerr of Ferniehirst
- Rev Dr Thomas Somerville FRSE

== Tourism ==
This abbey along with three others (Kelso, Dryburgh and Melrose) and other historic sights are on the Borders Abbeys Way walk.

== Gallery ==
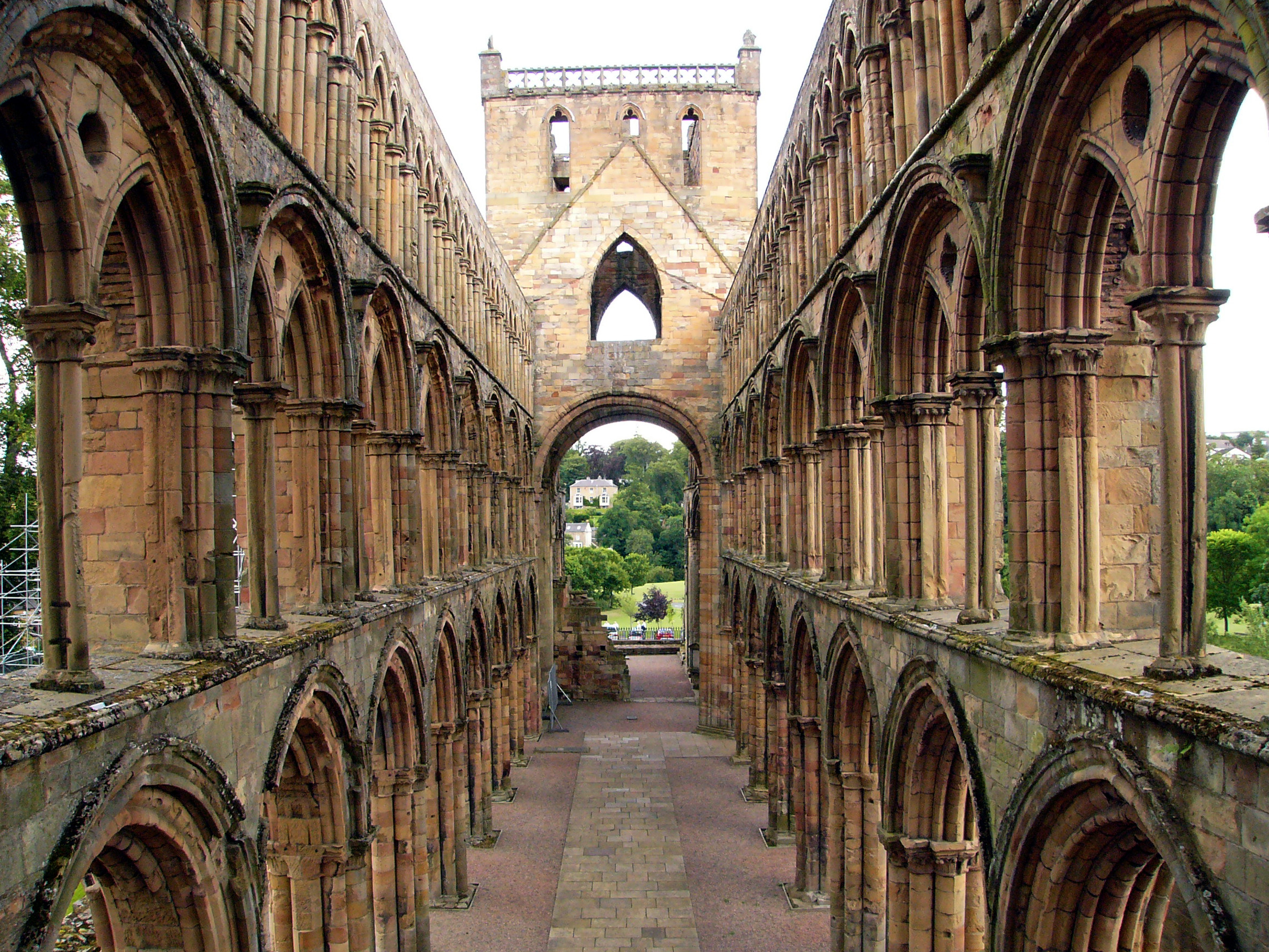
The nave looking east, from the gallery above the west door

The abbey from the air. The spire to the left marks the site of the precinct gate.

The west front of the church, with rose window

The north transept and crossing tower

The church looking west, showing the giant order of the choir

== See also ==
- Abbot of Jedburgh, for a list of priors, abbots and commendators
- List of places in the Scottish Borders
- List of places in Scotland
- List of monastic houses in Scotland
