= Bishop of Ross (Scotland) =

Historical eligious position in Scotland

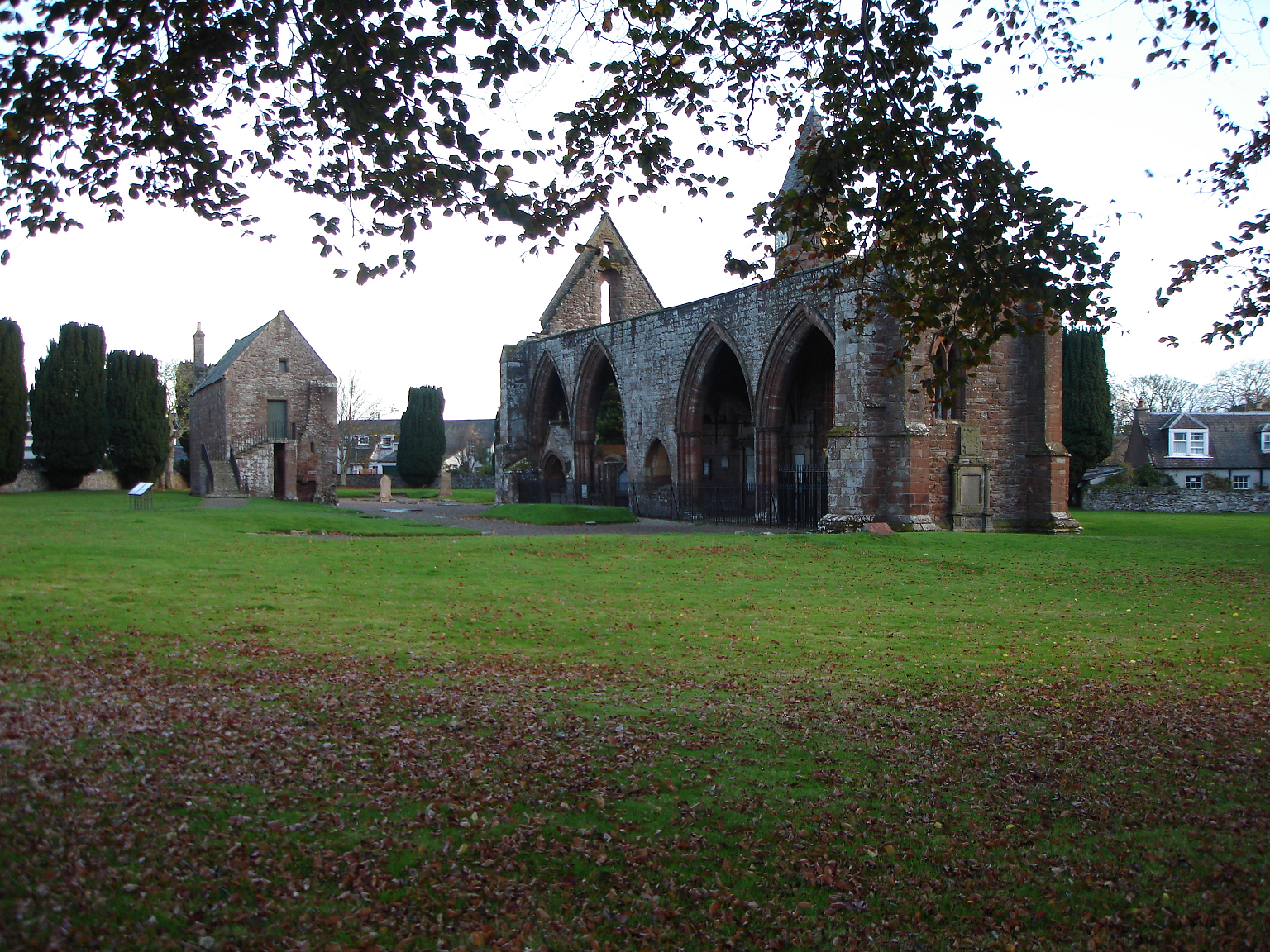
The ruins of Fortrose Cathedral on the Black Isle. After the mid-13th century, it was here, rather than the old Pictish centre of nearby Rosemarkie, where the bishop of Ross had his seat (cathedra).

The Bishop of Ross was the ecclesiastical head of the Diocese of Ross, one of Scotland's 13 medieval bishoprics. The first recorded bishop appears in the late 7th century as a witness to Adomnán of Iona's Cáin Adomnáin. The bishopric was based at the settlement of Rosemarkie until the mid-13th century, afterwards being moved to nearby Fortrose and Fortrose Cathedral. As far as the evidence goes, this bishopric was the oldest of all bishoprics north of the Forth, and was perhaps the only Pictish bishopric until the 9th century. Indeed, the Cáin Adomnáin indicates that in the reign of Bruide mac Der Ilei, king of the Picts, the bishop of Rosemarkie was the only significant figure in Pictland other than the king. The bishopric is located conveniently close to the heartland of Fortriu, being just across the water from Moray.

However, in the High and Later Middle Ages, the bishopric was only of medium-to-low status in the Scottish church. The Bishopric's links with Rome ceased to exist after the Scottish Reformation, but continued, saving temporary abolition between 1638 and 1661, under the episcopal Church of Scotland until the Revolution of 1688. Episcopacy in the established church in Scotland was permanently abolished in 1689.

== List of known bishops and abbots of Ross maic Bairend ==
Tenure	Incumbent	Notes
fl. 690x710	Curetán	Later named or conflated with St Boniface. He is listed as one of the witnesses in the Cáin Adomnáin, where he is called "Curetan epscop". In the Martyrology of Tallaght he is called "of Ross Mand Bairend" and in the Martyrology of O'Gorman he is styled "bishop and abbot of Ross maic Bairend". It is modern histiography that places this location at Rosemarkie in the Black Isle, Ross.

== List of known bishops of Ross ==
Tenure	Incumbent	Notes
fl. 1127 x 1131	Mac Bethad of Rosemarkie	
fl. 1147 x 1151-1155	Symeon of Rosemarkie	
1161-1195	Gregoir of Rosemarkie	
1195-1213	Reinald Macer	Former monk of Melrose Abbey.
1213 x 1214	Andreas de Moravia	Was elected, but got permission from the Pope to resign.
1214-1249	Robert (elder)	
1249-1271	Robert (younger)	
1272-1274	Matthew	
1275-1292 x 1295	Robert de Fyvie	
1292 x 1295-1295	Adam de Darlington	After the death of Bishop Robert (III.) de Fyvie, both Adam, precentor of Ross, and Thomas de Dundee were elected to the see. "Master Adam" voyaged to Rome resigned his claim in Thomas' favour; became Bishop of Caithness in the following year.
1293 x 1295-1325	Thomas de Dundee	
1325-1350	Roger	Perhaps the same as Roger de Balnebrich, unsuccessful Bishop-elect of Dunblane.
1350-1371	Alexander Stewart	
1371-1398	Alexander de Kylwos	
1398-1416 x 1418	Alexander de Waghorn	
1416 x 1418	Thomas Lyell	It appears that, although he appears briefly in the sources as "Bishop elect", he never appears to have been consecrated, namely because Avignon Pope Benedict XIII had reserved the see for his own appointment.
1418-1422	Gruffydd Young	Anti-Bishop during schism. Welshman, formerly Bishop of Bangor. Never obtained possession, but retained title until made titular Bishop of Hippo.
1418-1439 x 1440	John Bullock	
1440-1441	Andrew Munro	Previously, Archdeacon of Ross. He had been postulated by the chapter, but despite great expense and effort, Pope Eugene IV disallowed the postulation and appointed the bishopric to Thomas de Tulloch.
1440-1460 x 1461	Thomas de Tulloch	
1461-1476	Henry Cockburn	
1476-1480x1481	John Woodman	
1481-1483	William Elphinstone	Was provided by Pope Sixtus IV, but in 1483 was translated to the Bishopric of Aberdeen.
1483-1488 x 1492	Thomas Hay	
1492-1492 x 1494	John Guthrie	
1497-1507	John Fraser	
1507-1524	Robert Cockburn	Translated to bishopric of Dunkeld in 1524.
1523-1538	James Hay	
1538-1545	Robert Cairncross	
1547-1558	David Panter	
1558-1565	Henry Sinclair	
1566-1568/73/92	John Lesley	Most famous bishop of Ross, because of his work as a historian. He was forfeited on 19 August 1568 (though still acting as bishop in 1573) for his catholic and Marian sympathies by the Scottish church, but had his position reaffirmed by the Papacy. He was rehabilitated as Bishop between March 1587 and May 1589. He was translated as the Bishop of Coutances in 1592. Died 31 May 1596.
1574-1578	Alexander Hepburn	See above.
1600-1613	David Lindsay	
1613-1633	Patrick Lindsay	Became Archbishop of Glasgow.
1633-1638	John Maxwell	Episcopacy abolished in December 1638. Maxwell became Bishop of Killala and Achonry in 1641 and Archbishop of Tuam in 1645. He died in 1647
1662-1679	John Paterson	First bishop in the "Restoration Episcopate".
1679-1684	Alexander Young	Previously Bishop of Edinburgh. Died 1684.
1684-1689	James Ramsay	Previously Bishop of Dunblane. Deprived of his see with the Abolition of Episcopacy in the Church of Scotland, 22 July 1689.
