= Gruffydd Young =

15th-century Welsh cleric

Gruffydd Young (or Griffin Yonge) (c. 1370 – c. 1435) was a cleric and a close supporter of Owain Glyndŵr during his Welsh rebellion against the English King Henry IV between 1400 and 1412.

== Winning favour ==
He was of illegitimate birth and won the favour of Queen Anne of Bohemia, the first wife of King Richard II of England.

== Church career ==
Between 1391 and 1403 he held various positions within the dioceses of St. Davids and Bangor, Gwynedd at Llanynys between Denbigh and Ruthin and Llanbadarn Fawr and then prebends at Garthbrengy near Brecon, Boughrood near Hay-on-Wye, Lampeter and Bangor itself.

He rose to be vicar-general at St. Davids and then Archdeacon of Merioneth.

== Glyndŵr's Chancellor and Envoy in France ==
He allied himself to Glyndŵr in 1403 becoming Owain's Chancellor and by 1404 was in Paris, with Glyndŵr's brother-in-law John Hanmer and John Trevor the Bishop of St. Asaph negotiating a treaty of alliance with the French King Charles VI of France, or at least with his representative James II, Count of La Marche.

He was closely involved in Owain's strategy and formulated the Pennal Policy in which Owain stated that he would transfer the allegiance of the Welsh church away from Rome to the Antipope Benedict XIII in Avignon.

In 1407 he managed to gain the role of Bishop of Bangor after intrigues against the incumbent Bishop Llywelyn Byford and within a few months ensured his own transfer to St. Davids where if the Pennal Policy had come into effect he would have become the primate of the Church in Wales.

== Setbacks ==
By 1408 as the rebellion was experiencing setbacks he made his own future plans. Outside events were leading towards the Council of Constance which soon brought the schism of two competing Popes to an end with the election of Pope Martin V. The Pennal Policy was to become redundant. Young instead was appointed as Bishop of Ross in the Kingdom of Scotland, by Pope Martin V, but he was never really in firm control of his diocese and was transferred to become titular Bishop of Hippo in North Africa along with two livings in Rheims and Tours in France.

He was appointed abbot of the abbey of Le Thoronet, in the south of France, by Pope Martin V in 1430.

He was still referring to himself as Bishop of Ross in 1430 and certainly lived beyond 1432. His exact end is not known.

== Sources ==
- JE Lloyd : 'Owen Glendower'
- Chris Barber : 'In Search of Owain Glyndŵr'
- Archives départementales du Var : Bulla Papae Martini V, 2H19
