= Succentor =

The succentor ("under-singer") is the assistant to the precentor, typically in an ancient cathedral foundation, helping with the preparation and conduct of the liturgy including psalms, preces and responses. In English cathedrals today, the priest responsible for liturgy and music is usually the precentor, but some cathedrals, such as St Paul's, Southwark Cathedral, Durham, and Christ Church, Oxford, retain a succentor as well. Lichfield used the title subchanter. Westminster Abbey also retains the tradition; Brecon Cathedral previously had only a succentor, and no precentor, but this changed in 2022 with the appointment of The Rev'd Canon Steven Griffith to the post of precentor. The only succentor in Australia is at St Paul's Cathedral, Melbourne. In the USA, Grace Cathedral, San Francisco uses both titles. The succentor is normally a minor canon.

Radley College appears to be unique in having a lay succentor, who is the college organist and assistant to the lay precentor, the director of music.
