= Archdeacon of Ross =

Medieval church official

The Archdeacon of Ross was the only archdeacon in the medieval Diocese of Ross, acting as a deputy of the Bishop of Ross. The following is a list of archdeacons:

== List of archdeacons of Ross ==
- Robert, x 1223-1249 x 1250
- Robert de Fyvie, x 1269-1275
- John de Musselburgh, fl. 1279
- ?
- Alexander Stewart, x 1343-1350
- Thomas de Urquhart, x 1358-1365 x 1376
- Alexander Man, x 1376-1381
- Alexander de Waghorn, 1381 x 1398-1398
- David Seton, x 1399-1418 x 1422
- John de Inchmartin, 1409-1421 x 1422
- Andrew Munro, 1422-1451 x 1454
- Alexander Seton, fl. 1424 x 1430
- William Ross, 1451 x 1454-1455
- Richard Forbes, 1455-1460
- Patrick Vaus, 1460-1466
- Alexander Stewart, fl. 1472
- Gilbert MacDowell, x 1480
- Donald MacCulloch, fl. 1480
- David Lichton, 1483-1484
- Richard Muirhead, 1484-1488 x 1492
- John Scherar, fl. 1492-1506
- Robert Elphinstone, fl. 1510
- Mungo (Kentigern) Monypenny, fl. 1537-1545
- Donald Fraser, 1545 x 1546-1572 x 1573
- Robert Graham, 1573-1598 x 1602
- George Graham, 1602
- John MacKenzie, 1602-1636 x 1642

== Bibliography ==
- Watt, D.E.R., Fasti Ecclesiae Scotinanae Medii Aevi ad annum 1638, 2nd Draft, (St Andrews, 1969), pp. 285–7

== See also ==
- Bishop of Ross (Scotland)
