= Cullicudden =

Coordinates: 57.64973°N 4.25381°W

Cullicudden: Scottish Gaelic: Cùl a' Chudainn
- Location within the Ross and Cromarty area
- OS grid reference: NH655644
- Council area: Highland
- Country: Scotland
- Sovereign state: United Kingdom
- Postcode district: IV7 8
- Police: Scotland
- Fire: Scottish
- Ambulance: Scottish

Cullicudden (Scottish Gaelic: Cùl a' Chudainn) is an ancient village located close to the southeast shore of the Cromarty Firth, 2 miles northeast of Dingwall, on the west shore of the Black Isle in Ross-shire, Scottish Highlands and is in the Scottish council area of Highland.

== Settlements ==
Cullicuden is located 4 miles west-south-west of Invergordon and 25.5 miles north of Inverness.
