= Kinloss Abbey =

Ruined abbey in Kinloss, Moray, Scotland

Coordinates: 57.6338°N 3.5665°W

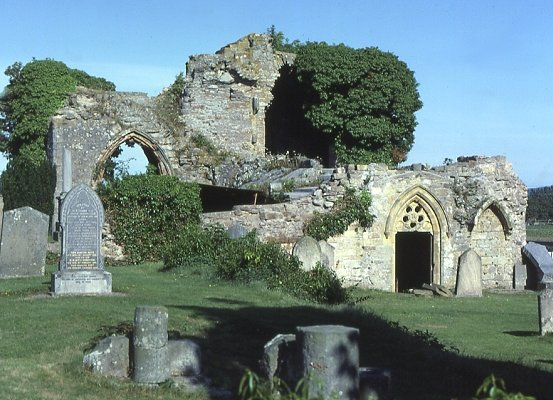
- Ruins in 1984
- Interactive map of Kinloss Abbey

Monastery information
- Order: Cistercian
- Established: 1151
- Disestablished: 1601
- Mother house: Melrose Abbey
- Diocese: Diocese of Moray
- Controlled churches: Avoch; Ellon

People
- Founder: David I of Scotland
- Important associated figures: Radulf, Robert Reid

Scheduled monument
- Official name: Kinloss Abbey
- Type: Ecclesiastical: abbey; burial ground, cemetery, graveyard; church; claustral remains, Secular: house
- Designated: 30 April 1920
- Reference no.: SM1227

Kinloss Abbey is a Cistercian abbey at Kinloss in the county of Moray, Scotland.

The abbey was founded in 1150 by King David I "in order to extend the benefits of civilisation to the remoter regions under his sway." The legend of its founding is similar to that of the founding of Holyrood Abbey. According to the legend, while hunting, the king lost his way in the woods but was rescued by a deer, which guided him to a clearing. He was later persuaded by a vision, which he regarded to have been sent by the Virgin Mary, to build a church there in her honor. It was first colonised by monks from Melrose Abbey. It received its Papal Bull from Pope Alexander III in 1174, and later came under the protection of the Bishop of Moray in 1187. The abbey went on to become one of the largest and wealthiest religious houses in Scotland, receiving the valuable salmon fishing rights on the River Findhorn from Robert the Bruce in 1312, subsequently renewed by James I and James IV.

During its history the abbey has received many royal visitors, including Edward I in 1303, Edward III in 1336 and Mary, Queen of Scots, in 1562. The most renowned of the 24 abbots the monastery had was Robert Reid. Reid introduced organised education, erecting a new fireproof library enriched with volumes belonging to him personally and, in 1537, a new abbot's house. He became Bishop of Orkney in 1541. In his will of 1583, he bequeathed "8000 merks 'for to big [build] ane college' in the Burgh of Edinburgh."

While a student in Paris, Robert Reid formed a friendship with John Ferrerius, a native of the Piedmont region in Italy, and in 1528 invited him to Kinloss to serve as an educator. While there, Ferrerius wrote a long account of the various abbots of Kinloss and their works, the majority of which have not survived.

The abbey and its lands were part of the Barony of Muirton and the Lordship of Kinloss at various times.

In 1553, Bishop Reid was succeeded as abbot by his nephew, Walter Reid, whose abbacy coincided with the upheavals of the Protestant Reformation in Scotland. During that time, a great part of the lands of Kinloss were alienated to the Crown. Edward Bruce commendator after the Reformation, was granted some of the lands and fishing areas of Kinloss, raising him to the temporal lordship, Lord Bruce of Kinloss. In 1645 the remaining buildings of the abbey were conveyed to Alexander Brodie of Lethen, who sold the materials for the construction of Oliver Cromwell’s citadel at Inverness.

Few of the monastic buildings remain standing today. The remains of the abbey are now situated within a graveyard owned by the local authority, and are therefore accessible at all times. They are designated a scheduled monument.

== See also ==
- Abbot of Kinloss, for a list of abbots and commendators
- List of listed buildings in Kinloss
- Scheduled monuments in Moray
