= Abbot of Kinloss =

The Abbot of Kinloss (later Commendator of Kinloss) was the head of the property and Cistercian monastic community of Kinloss Abbey, Moray, founded by King David I of Scotland around 1151 by monks from Melrose Abbey. The abbey was transformed into a temporal lordship for Edward Bruce, the last commendator, who became Lord Kinloss. The following is a list of abbots and commendators:

== List of abbots ==
- Ascelin, 1150-1174
- Reiner, 1174-1189
- Radulf, 1189-1194
- Radulf, 1202x1207-1220
- Robert, 1220
- Herbert, 1226-1251
- Richard, 1251-1274
- Andrew, 1275-1286
- Gilbert, 1296
- Henry, x1316
- Thomas Dere, 1316-1338 x 1344
- Simon, 1346
- Richard, 1362-1371
- Adam de Tarras, 1389-1414
- William de Blare, 1414-1429
- John Floter, 1431-1444
- Henry Butre/Butoe, 1439-1444
- John de Ellem, 1443-1467
- James Guthrie, 1467-1481
- John Pittendreich, 1478
- William Galbraith, 1481-1490
- Hugh Martini, 1490-1491
- William Culross, 1491-1500
- Andrew Forman, 1492
- Thomas Crystall (Christopheri/Wawain), 1500-1528
- Robert Reid, 1528-1553
- Walter Reid, 1553-1587

== List of commendators ==
- Edward Bruce, 1587-1601

== Bibliography ==
- Cowan, Ian B. & Easson, David E., Medieval Religious Houses: Scotland With an Appendix on the Houses in the Isle of Man, Second Edition, (London, 1976), p. 76
- Watt, D.E.R. & Shead, N.F. (eds.), The Heads of Religious Houses in Scotland from the 12th to the 16th Centuries, The Scottish Records Society, New Series, Volume 24, (Edinburgh, 2001), pp. 131–34

== See also ==
- Kinloss Abbey
