= Diocese of Ross (Scotland) =

Diocese in Scotland (c. 1130-1560)

Coordinates: 57.581°N 4.132°W

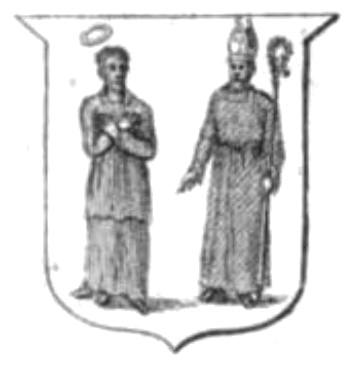
- Head: Bishop of Ross
- Archdeacon(s): Archdeacon of Ross
- Known rural deans: Dingwall, [not known]
- First attestation: 9th century
- Metropolitan before 1472: None
- Metropolitan after 1492: Archbishop of St Andrews
- Cathedral: Fortrose Cathedral
- Previous cathedral(s): Rosemarkie (?)
- Dedication: St Peter
- Native dedication: St Boniface (or Curetán)
- Canons: Secular
- Mensal churches: Nigg, Tarbat
- Common churches: Applecross, Gairloch, Kintail, Lochalsh, Lochbroom, Lochcarron
- Prebendal churches: Alness, Ardersier (Dean), Avoch (Abbot of Kinloss), Contin, Cullicudden, Dingwall, Edderton (Subdean), Fodderty (archdeacon), Inverferan (Succentor), Kilchrist, Killearnan (Archdeacon), Kilmorack (Precentor), for a brief time held by the Chancellor), Kilmuir Easter, Kilmuir Wester (Dean), Kiltearn, Kincardine, Kinnettes (Chancellor, held briefly by Precentor), Kirkmichael, Lemlair (briefly held by Archdeacon), Logie Easter, Logie Wester (Treasurer, briefly held by Archdeacon), Newnakle, Nigg (Bishop), Rosemarkie, Roskeen, Suddy (Precentor), Tain (Subdean), Tarbat (Bishop), Urquhart (Treasurer), Urray (Succentor)
- Catholic successor: Merged into resurrected Diocese of Aberdeen, 4 March 1878
- Episcopal successor: Diocese of Moray, Ross and Caithness

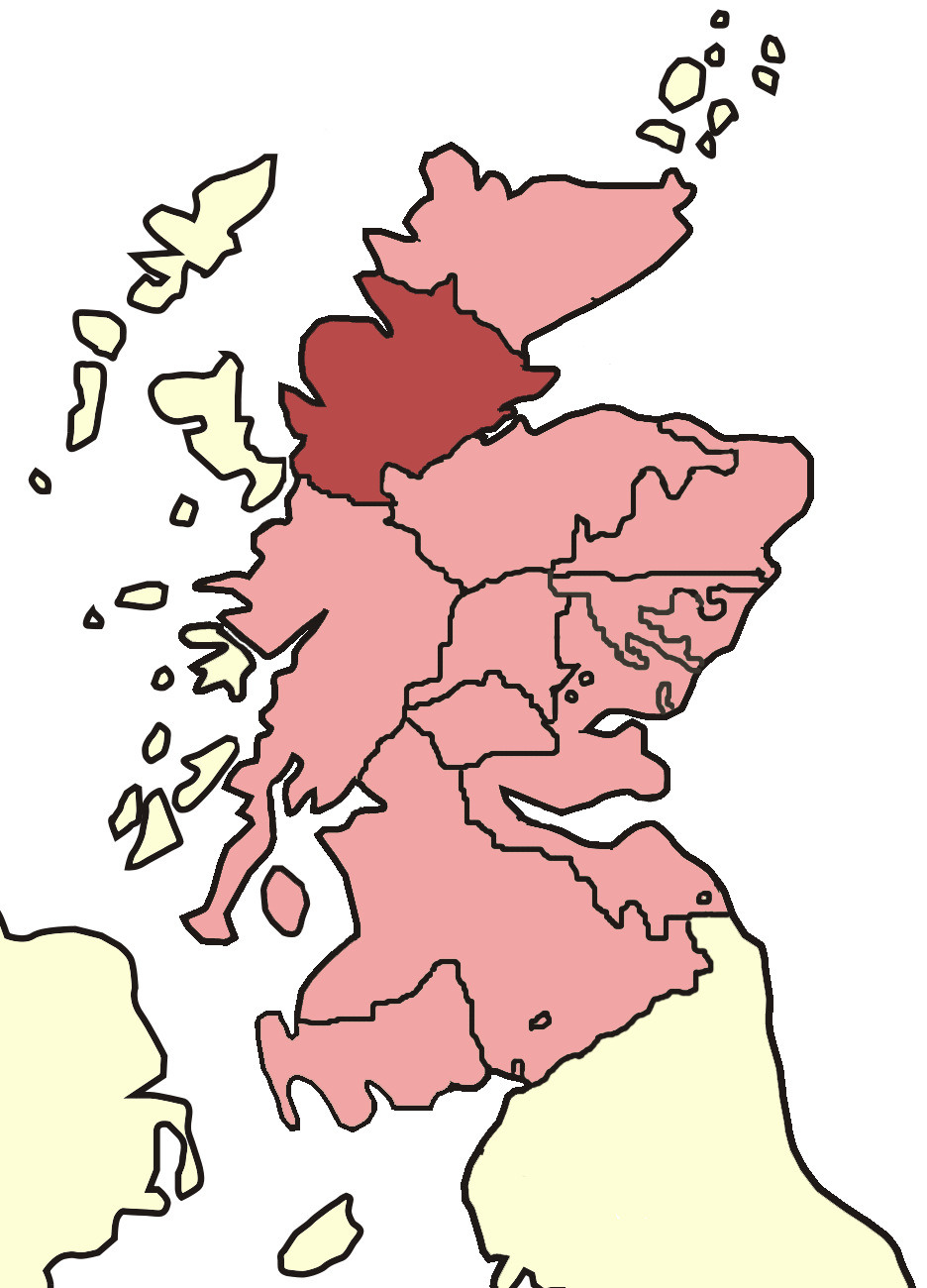
Skene's map of Scottish bishoprics in the reign of David I (reigned 1124–1153).

The Diocese of Ross was an ecclesiastical territory or diocese in the Highland region of Scotland during the Middle Ages and Early modern period. The Diocese was led by the Bishop of Ross, and the cathedral was, latterly, at Fortrose. The bishops of the Early Church were located at Rosemarkie. The diocese had only one Archdeacon, the Archdeacon of Ross, first attested in 1223 with the appearance of Archdeacon Robert, who was consecrated bishop of Ross on 21 June 1249 x 20 June 1250. There is only one known Dean of Christianty (sic) (rural dean), one Donald Reid called the dean of christianty of Dingwall on 12 June 1530.

A dean of the cathedral chapter (Henry) is first recorded in 1212 x 1213; a Subdean (William de Balvin) in 1356. A Precentor, sometimes in Scotland called Chanter, (Adam de Darlington) is attested in 1255, a Succentor (Matthew) in 1255. A Chancellor (Maurice) is attested for the first time in 1212 x 1213, a Treasurer (William) in 1227.

Following the Scottish Reformation of 1560, the Presbyterian Church of Scotland abolished the episcopacy in the diocese. The Roman Catholic Church continued to appoint bishops in communion with the Holy See. Bishop John Lesley, however, was a post-reformation bishop who remained catholic. Episcopacy was abolished in the Church of Scotland between 1638 and 1661, when it was restored under the "Restoration Episcopate". After the Glorious Revolution of 1688, Scottish bishoprics again came under threat until in 1689 Episcopacy was permanently abolished in the established church in Scotland. From the early 18th century, the Scottish Episcopal Church appointed bishops.

In the twelfth century, the diocese is usually called "Rosemarkie", but thereafter it is called Ross. The diocese covered, roughly, the old county of Ross (also called Ross-shire).

== List of parishes ==
1. Alness
2. Altyre (Kilmorack)
3. Applecross
4. Ardersier (exclave, geographically in Moray but in Ross diocese)
5. Avoch
6. Contin
7. Cromarty
8. Cullicudden
9. Dingwall
10. Edderton
11. Eddyrdor (Killearnan)
12. Fodderty
13. Fortrose Cathedral
14. Gairloch
15. Inveraferan (Urray)
16. Kilmoremethet (Kilmuir Easter)
17. Kilmuir Wester
18. Kiltearn
19. Kincardine
20. Kinnettes
21. Kintail
22. Kirkmichael
23. Lemlair
24. Lochalsh
25. Lochbroom
26. Lochcarron
27. Logiebride (Logie Wester)
28. Logiemethet (Logie Easter)
29. Nigg
30. Nonikiln/Newnakle (conjoined with Rosskeen by 1274)
31. Rosemarkie
32. Rosskeen
33. Suddie
34. Tain
35. Tarbat
36. Tarradale (Kilchrist)
37. Urquhart

== Titular Catholic see of Rosemarkie ==
In 1973, Ross was nominally restored as a Catholic titular see of the lowest (Episcopal) rank, under the name Rosemarkie. It has had three incumbents.

== Bibliography ==
- Cowan, Ian B., The Parishes of Medieval Scotland, Scottish Records Society Vol. 93, (Edinburgh, 1967)
- McNeill, Peter G.B. & MacQueen, Hector L. (eds), Atlas of Scottish History to 1707, (Edinburgh, 1996)
- Watt, D.E.R., Fasti Ecclesiae Scotinanae Medii Aevi ad annum 1638, 2nd Draft, (St Andrews, 1969)
