= Bowden, Scottish Borders =

Village in Scottish Borders, Scotland

Coordinates: 55.5661°N 2.7071°W

Bowden
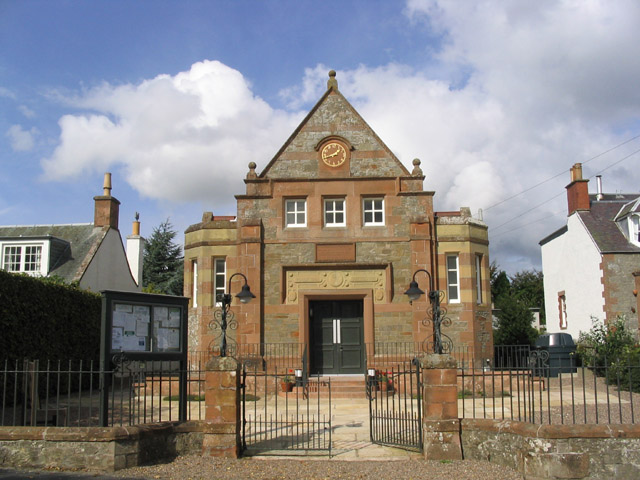
- Bowden Village Hall built 1896

- Location within the Scottish Borders
- Population: 223 (2001)
- OS grid reference: NT555305
  - Edinburgh: 33 mi (53 km) NW
- Civil parish: Bowden
- Community council: Bowden Village
- Council area: Scottish Borders
- Lieutenancy area: Roxburgh, Ettrick and Lauderdale
- Country: Scotland
- Sovereign state: United Kingdom
- Post town: MELROSE
- Postcode district: TD6
- Dialling code: 01896
- Police: Scotland
- Fire: Scottish
- Ambulance: Scottish
- UK Parliament: Berwickshire, Roxburgh and Selkirk
- Scottish Parliament: Ettrick, Roxburgh and Berwickshire

Bowden is a village in the Roxburghshire area of the Scottish Borders, situated 3 miles (5 kilometres) south of Melrose, 2 miles (3 kilometres) west of Newtown St Boswells and tucked in the shadow of the Eildon Hills, Scotland.

== History ==
In 1113, when King David I of Scotland granted lands to the monks of Selkirk, he also granted them the land at Bothandene (Bowden) and Hailiedene (Holydean). The charter was renewed in 1124 when the monks moved to Kelso, where they founded the magnificent Kelso Abbey. At the same time a religious establishment was founded at Bowden. The abbot of Kelso built a tower at Holydean which was destroyed in 1296. The tower was rebuilt and extended by Isabel Ker of Cessford and renamed Castle Holydean. The castle became the home of the Ker family, later the Dukes of Roxburghe, who lived there for two centuries before the castle was finally destroyed in 1760 by the 3rd Duke, John Ker. The Roxburghes moved to their new home, Floors Castle, in the early 18th century.

In 1531, Bowden village was granted the right to hold a market, the first non-burghal market in Scotland, and a market cross which still stands today was erected - such was the importance of the village in mediaeval times. The cross is now used as the parish war memorial.

The present Bowden Kirk was greatly enlarged in the 17th century, but parts of an older church are still evident. The church is unusual inasmuch as it has three bells, two of which are still in use. The third bell is contained inside the church and bears the inscription SOLI DEO GLORIA JOHN MEIKEL ME FECIT EDINBURGHII ANNO 1690, meaning "I was built by the grace of God at Edinburgh in 1690 by John Meikle". John Meikle was an eminent bell maker and tuner in 17th century Edinburgh. The old kirkyard contains many interesting gravestones and, under the east wing, a burial vault which contains 22 members of the Ker family, six of them Dukes of Roxburghe. The church is embellished with some wonderful stained glass windows including the Priest's Door, built at the old priest's doorway.

Bowden has been blessed with education since just after the Scottish Reformation in 1590. The last school was built in the middle of the 19th century but closed in the mid 20th century. The school and schoolmaster's house are still standing and are used as private homes.

The Bowden village well was erected in 1861 and still stands in the atmospheric village adjacent to the old school. The village hall was erected in 1896.

While the first mention of Bowden is in the early 12th century, its original name of Bothanden is from the old English language meaning houses at the stream, the stream in question being the Bowden Burn which cuts through the village. Many artifacts from the Iron-Age have been found in and around Bowden, and there were even traces of an old military road from the Romans in Scotland period. It is known that ancient British tribes lived on the Eildon Hills. The Romans built a fort at nearby Newstead and named it Trimontium, meaning three hills.

Originally the people of Bowden were farm labourers and weavers, but in modern times the village is inhabited by many professional people, including doctors, nurses and schoolteachers. After local government restructuring in the early 1970s, Bowden became part of the newly formed Scottish Borders Council.

The war memorial in Bowden dates from 1915, reflecting the early local sacrifice made by this community during World War I. The memorial was designed by Sir Robert Lorimer.

== Community Facilities ==
Bowden has a refurbished village hall in the centre of the village.

Bowden Village Hall was built and opened in 1897. The money for erecting the building was all given locally. Many gave services in assisting with the building, including the local farmers who gave their services free for executing the haulage work.

The building was designed by Mr Wallace who was the son of a well-known village family. His father having a thriving joiners' business in the village in the 19th century. Mr Wallace gave the design and plans as his contribution to the erection of the hall.

The hall was completely refurbished in 2003 thanks to a grant from the National Lottery. This enabled the main hall to be extended by removing the stage and a stepped gallery to be converted into the existing Scott Room. Other improvements were provision of disabled access, a new kitchen and upgraded toilets.

A stone inserted into the front wall of the village hall commemorates the legacy from one of the village benefactors, Mr William Dick. He was educated in the village, and then left and spent his life on the railway system. On his retiral he came back to his native Village and resided here until his death in 1925. He left the residue of his estate for the light and improvement of the village. Electric lights were switched on in 1930 to light up the village. Further monies were used to fund extra cloakrooms and to install a hot water system in the village Hall.

To the south of the village lies the village kirk, which dates back to 1128.

== Notable people associated with Bowden ==
- Thomas Aird
- Lady Grisell Baillie
- Lauder Brunton
- William Dick, Stationmaster (1847 – 1925), supported Bowden's village development with his legacy
- Sir Angus Stewart Deaton, FBA (born 19 October 1945) is a British economist and academic. Deaton is currently a Senior Scholar and the Dwight D. Eisenhower Professor of Economics and International Affairs Emeritus at the Princeton School of Public and International Affairs and the Economics Department at Princeton University. His research focuses primarily on poverty, inequality, health, wellbeing, and economic development. In 2015, he was awarded the Nobel Memorial Prize in Economic Sciences for his analysis of consumption, poverty, and welfare.
- Dr. James Jamieson F.R.C.S.E (1841-1905), a surgeon, born in Bowden. Chairman of the Council, Border Counties Association. Father of James Jamieson (dentist).
- Andrew Scott (1757 – 1839), The Bowden Poet
- Thomas Scott, (1854–1927), Painter, lived in Bowden after his marriage to Agnes Buckham. Painted Bowden Kirk, near Melrose, Roxburghshire, 1906
- James Thomson (1827 – 1888), Poet and songwriter (not to be confused with poets: James Thomson 1700 – 1748, James Thomson 1763 – 1832, or James Thomson 1834 - 1882). Born in Bowden, best known for penning the words to The Star o' Rabbie Burns.

== Listed Buildings ==
There are many listed buildings, of various categories, in around the village of Bowden, including the kirk, schoolhouse, market cross and the well.

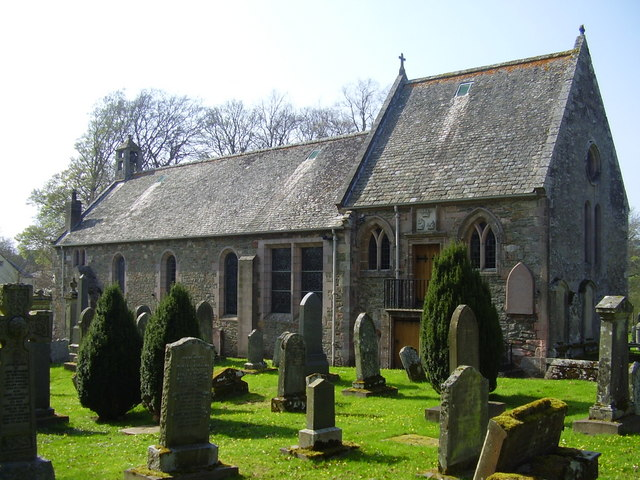
Mediaeval kirk (extended 17th century)

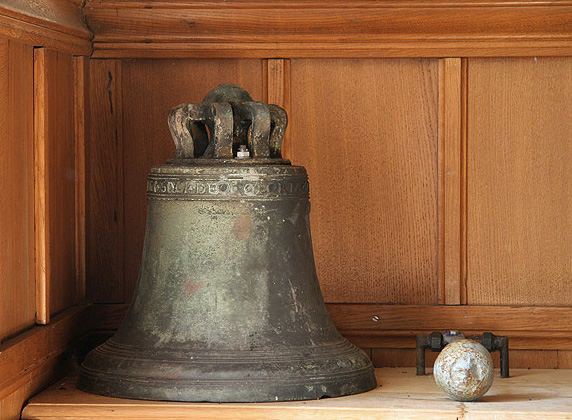
Bowden Church bell (1690)

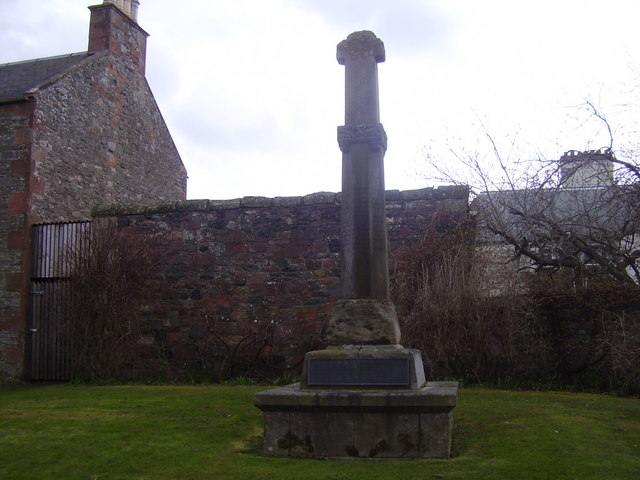
Market cross (1531)

== See also ==
- List of places in the Scottish Borders
- List of places in East Lothian
- List of places in Edinburgh
- List of places in Midlothian
- List of places in West Lothian
- List of places in Scotland
