= Abbot of Kelso =

The Abbot of Kelso (later Commendator of Kelso) was the head of the Tironensian monastic community at Kelso Abbey in the Scottish Borders. The Abbey was originally founded at Selkirk in 1113 by David, Prince of the Cumbrians (r. 1113–1124), and thus the first three Abbots were Abbots of Selkirk. The community was moved to Kelso by David (then King of Scots, r. 1124–1153) and John, Bishop of Glasgow in 1127. The abbot was the first in Scotland to be granted the mitre in 1165. In the 16th century the monastery increasingly came under secular control, and finally in 1607 it was granted as a secular lordship (Holydean) to its last commendator, Robert Ker of Cesford, later Earl of Roxburghe. The following is a list of abbots and commendators:

== List of abbots of Selkirk ==
- Radulf, 1113–1116 x 1117
- William, 1118–1119
- Herbert, 1119–1127

== List of abbots of Kelso ==
- Herbert, 1127–1147. The same as the last abbot of Selkirk; became Bishop of Glasgow.
- Ernald, 1147–1160. Became Bishop of St Andrews.
- John, 1160–1180
- Osbert, 1180–1203. Previously Prior of Lesmahagow, a Kelso daughter-house.
- Geoffrey, 1203
- Richard de Cane (Cave ?), 1206–1208
- Henry, 1208–1218
- Richard, 1218–1221
- Herbert Maunsel, 1221–1239
- Hugh, 1236–1248
- Robert de Smalhame, 1248–1258
- Patrick, 1258–1260
- Henry de Lambden, 1260–1275
- J[ ], 1281
- Richard, 1285–1299
- Thomas de Durham, 1299 x 1307. An English royal appointee. Later became Prior of Lesmahagow.
- Waleran, 1307–1311
- William de Alyncrome, 1317–1326
- William de Dalgarnock, 1329–1342
- Roger, 1351–1353
- William, 1353–1354
- William de Bolden, 1367–1372
- Patrick, 1392–1411(?)
- William de Kelso, 1411–1426
- William, 1435–1447
- Richard Robson (Roberts), 1456–1464
- George Bois (Boy), 1460
- William Bonkil (Bonde), 1462
- Alan de Camera (Kuk, Cook), 1464–1466
- Richard Robson, 1466–1468
- Richard Wylie, 1467
- Robert Ker, 1468–1506
- Richard Wylie (again), 1469–1473. Opposed election of Ker, but resigned his rights. Was Prior of Lesmahagow since 1469.
- George, 1476

== List of commendators of Kelso ==
- Andrew Forman, 1511. Also bishop of Moray (1501–1514), Commendator of May (1495–1515 x 1521) and Commendator of Dryburgh (1509–1514 x 1516); previously Commendator of Culross (1492–1493), later became Commendator of Arbroath (1514), Archbishop of St Andrews (1514–1521) and Commendator of Dunfermline (1514–1521).
- Andrew Stewart, 1511–1517. Bishop of Caithness (1501–1516), as Andrew Stewart I.
- Thomas Ker (Car), 1513–1534
- James Stewart, 1534–1557. Bastard son of King James V of Scotland. Also Commendator of Melrose (1535–1557); not to be confused with his brother and namesake, James Stewart, Earl of Moray.
- Louis de Guise, 1558–1559. Also Commendator of Melrose (1558–1559), succeeding James Stewart.
- William Ker I, 1559–1566
- John Maitland of Thirlstane, 1567. Became Prior of Coldingham (1567–1561) in exchange with Francis Stewart I; later reasserted his right to Kelso (1587–1588)
- Francis Stewart (I) the elder, 1567–1592
- Francis Stewart (II) the younger, 1588
- William Ker II, 1588
- Robert Ker of Cesford, 1592

== Bibliography ==
- Cowan, Ian B. and Easson, David E., Medieval Religious Houses Scotland, Second edition, Longman Group Limited, (London, 1976) ISBN 0-582-12069-1
- Watt, D.E.R. & Shead, N.F. (eds.), The Heads of Religious Houses in Scotland from the 12th to the 16th Centuries, The Scottish Records Society, New Series, Volume 24, (Edinburgh, 2001), pp. 58–62

== See also ==
- Earl of Roxburghe
- Kelso Abbey
