= Cum universi =

1192 papal bull by Pope Celestine III

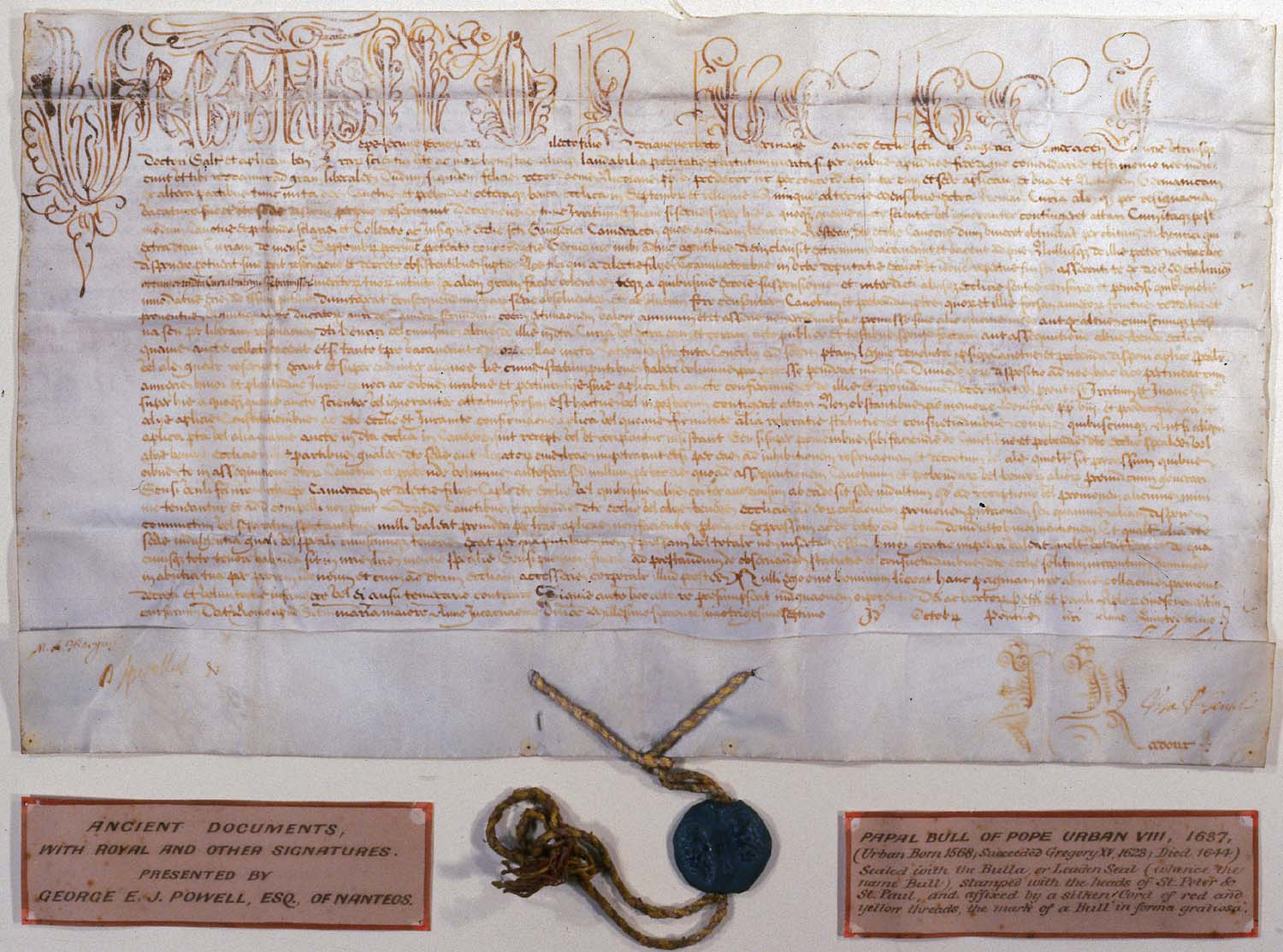
A papal bull sealed with a leaden bulla.

Cum universi (Note: The title phrase of the bull in Latin is Cum universi Christi jugo subjecti ad sedem Apostolicam patrocinium invenire debeant et favorem ("Since all those subject to the yoke of Christ should find patronage and favour at the Apostolic See...").) (Latin: Since all) is a papal bull written by Pope Celestine III, issued on 13 March 1192. (Note: Some historians, such as Anderson, state that the authorship of the bull could also be attributed to Pope Clement III.) The bull ended the claim of the Archbishop of York to metropolitan jurisdiction in Scotland and established an independent national church, albeit one with no figurehead.

== Background ==
Before the bull's publication, the church in Scotland had no metropolitan authority by way of an archbishop. Attempts had been made by Pope Paschal II in 1100 to attach the metropolitan authority of the Archbishop of York to Scotland in his letter Noscat dilectio, (Note: Latin: He knows the love.) which he addresses "to the suffragans of the metropolis of York per Scotiam".

Noscat dilectio was written on the promotion of Gerard, Bishop of Hereford to the archbishopric of York, commanding the Scottish bishops to obey Gerard and accept his authority, which the Scottish bishops refused to do.

On the consecration of Archbishop Thurstan of York by Pope Calixtus II, a more vigorous campaign was mounted insisting York's authority be recognised in Scotland. Although both Calixtus and successive popes commanded the obedience of the Scottish bishops to York, the bishops of St. Andrews and Glasgow refused, abetted by both King Alexander and King David.

In April 1125, Pope Honorius II wrote to King David commanding him to receive Cardinal John of Crema as papal legate to investigate the matter of the continued controversy with the metropolitan authority of the Archbishop Thurstan and the Scottish bishops. The inquiry was fruitless and in 1126, the pope summoned the Scottish bishops to Rome during Lent 1127 for an inquiry on their relationship with York. The meeting was, however, aborted.

== Consecration of Scottish Bishops ==
During the controversy, when a Scottish bishop required consecration it should have been performed by the Archbishop of York. (Note: This was by virtue of the Archbishop of York having metropolitan authority over the Scottish bishop's sees.) Due to vacancies arising in both sees concurrently, however, Bishop John and his successor Herbert were consecrated by the pope himself. The pattern then continued even when the See of York was not vacant, when Herbert's successor, Engelram, was consecrated by Pope Alexander III. Engelram's successor, Jocelyn was consecrated at Clairvaux by a papal legate.

== Rights established by the bull ==
The bull arose as a result of the controversy, and for the first time in the ecclesiastical history of Scotland, the church is referred to an entity (Scotticana ecclesia), comprising the dioceses of St. Andrews, Glasgow, Dunkeld, Dunblane, Brechin, Aberdeen, Moray, Ross and Caithness. The bull then goes on to outline the rights attached to the church:

- The church was a 'special daughter' of the apostolic see with no intermediary.
- No one could impose an interdict in the kingdom of Scotland except the pope or his legate.
- No foreigner could be a legate in Scotland unless specifically sent by the pope.
- The liberties and realm and churches granted by previous popes were confirmed by Celestine.
- Disputes which rose within the realm of Scotland could not be heard outside it, unless there was a direct appeal to the Holy See.

The bull is viewed as a pivotal moment in the history of the medieval Scottish church and instrumental in the removal of English influences in Scottish ecclesiastical affairs.

== See also ==
- Archbishop Thurstan of York
- Bishop John
- Herbert
