= Michael of Glasgow =

Bishop of Glasgow

Michael of Glasgow is the earliest known bishop of Glasgow of the 12th century. Records of his episcopate do not survive from the records of the Kingdom of Scotland, however a bishop and a bishop with the name Michael is recorded in foreign records. A letter of Ralph d'Escures, Archbishop of Canterbury (1114–22), to Pope Calixtus II, records that Thomas, Archbishop of York (1109–14), had ordained a bishop for the see of the "Britons of Glasgow". The bishop here is not named. However, Thomas Stubbs, a historian writing in the second half of the 14th century, tells us that Archbishop Thomas had ordained a man called Michael at the request of David, then Prince of the Cumbrians. Stubs informs us that Michael had dedicated churches in the diocese of York. According to Stubbs, Michael was buried in St Laurence's Church, Morland, Westmorland. It is possible that Michael was merely a nominal bishop, like the nominal York-appointed bishops of Orkney, whose main duties consisted of assisting the Archbishop of York in day-to-day duties.

Catholic Church titles
Vacant Title last held by John Scotus	Bishop of Glasgow fl. 1109–1114	Succeeded by John the Chaplain
