= Christianisation of Scotland =

Conversion of country to Christianity

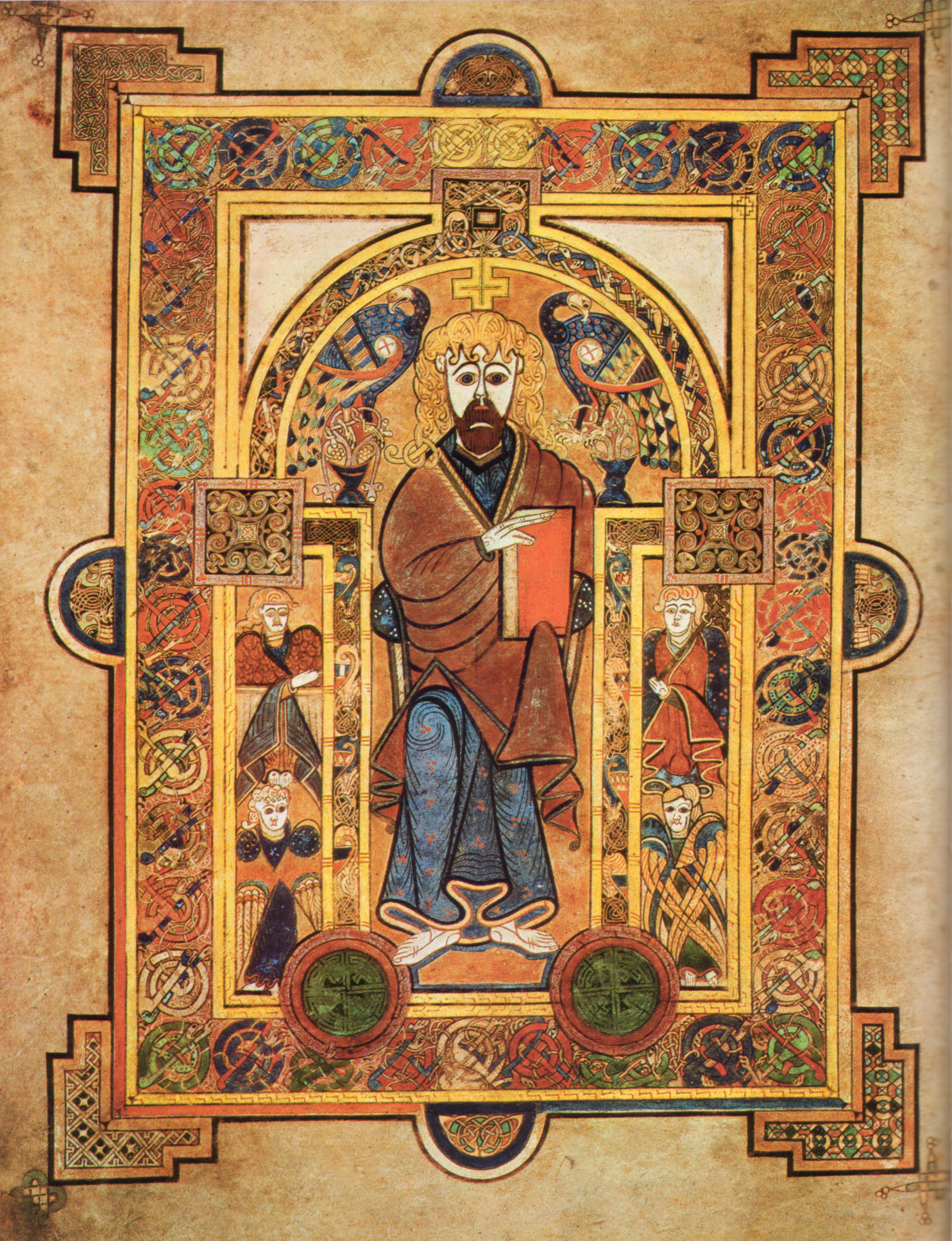
An illuminated page from the Book of Kells, which may have been produced at Iona around 800 AD

The Christianisation of Scotland was the process by which Christianity spread in what is now Scotland, which took place principally between the fifth and tenth centuries.

Christianity was probably introduced to what is now Lowland Scotland by Roman soldiers stationed in the north of the province of Britannia. After the collapse of Roman authority in 410 AD, Christianity is presumed to have survived among the British enclaves in the south of what is now Scotland, but retreated as the pagan Anglo-Saxons advanced.

Traditional narratives depict Scotland as largely converted by Irish missions associated with figures such as St. Columba, from the fifth to the seventh centuries, but many of these figures were later constructs or founded monasteries and collegiate churches in areas to which Christianity had already spread. Scholars have identified a distinctive form of Celtic Christianity, in which abbots were more significant than bishops, attitudes to clerical celibacy were more relaxed, and there were significant differences in practice with Roman Christianity, particularly the form of tonsure and the method of calculating Easter, although most of these issues had been resolved by the mid-seventh century.

After the reconversion of Scandinavian Scotland in the tenth century, Christianity under papal authority was the dominant religion of the kingdom. The process of Christianisation was also significant in the development of Scottish national identity, the Hiberno-Scottish mission to Continental Europe, the development of Insular art, and the introduction of Latin and formal education.

== Background ==
=== Pre-Christian religion ===
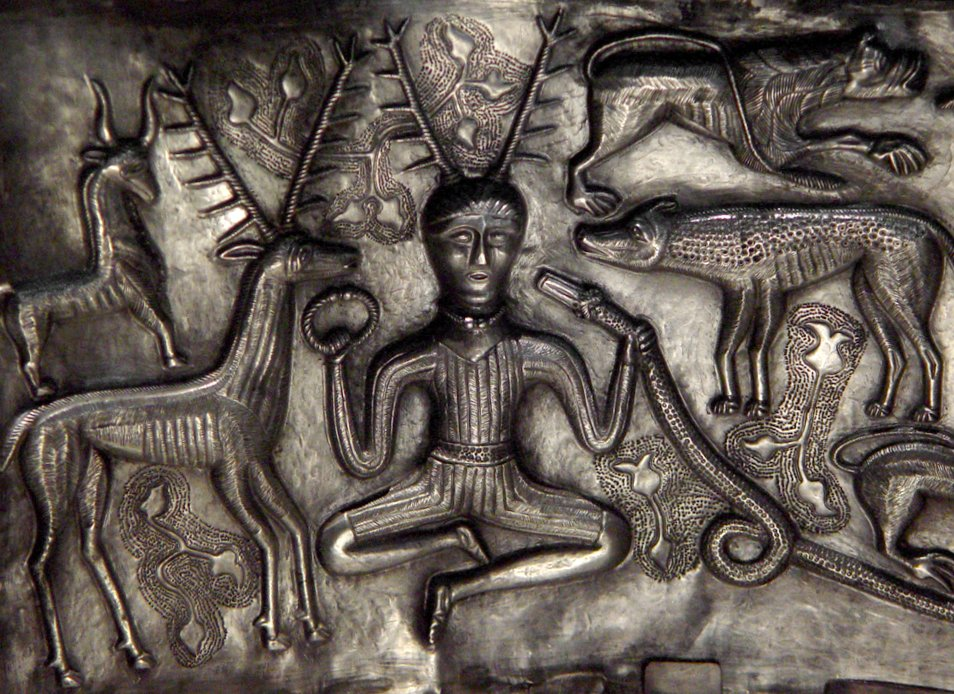
The "Cernunnos" type antlered figure on the Gundestrup Cauldron found in Denmark

Very little is known about religion in Scotland before the arrival of Christianity. The lack of native written sources among the Picts means that it can only be judged from parallels elsewhere, occasional surviving archaeological evidence and hostile accounts of later Christian writers. It is generally presumed to have resembled Celtic polytheism. The names of more than two hundred Celtic deities have been noted, some of which, like Lugh, The Dagda and The Morrigan, come from later Irish mythology, whilst others, like Teutates, Taranis and Cernunnos, come from evidence from Gaul. The Celtic pagans constructed temples and shrines to venerate these gods, something they did so through votive offerings and performing sacrifices, possibly including human sacrifice. According to Greek and Roman accounts, in Gaul, Britain and Ireland, there was a priestly caste of "magico-religious specialists" known as the druids, although very little is definitely known about them. Irish legends about the origin of the Picts and stories from the life of St. Ninian, associate the Picts with druids. The Picts are also associated in Christian writing with "demon" worship, which may be a Christian interpretation of their deities, and one story concerning St. Columba has him exorcising a demon from a well in Pictland, suggesting that the worship of well spirits was a feature of Pictish paganism. Roman mentions of the worship of the Goddess Minerva at wells, and a Pictish stone associated with a well near Dunvegan Castle on Skye, have been taken to support this case.

=== Roman influence ===
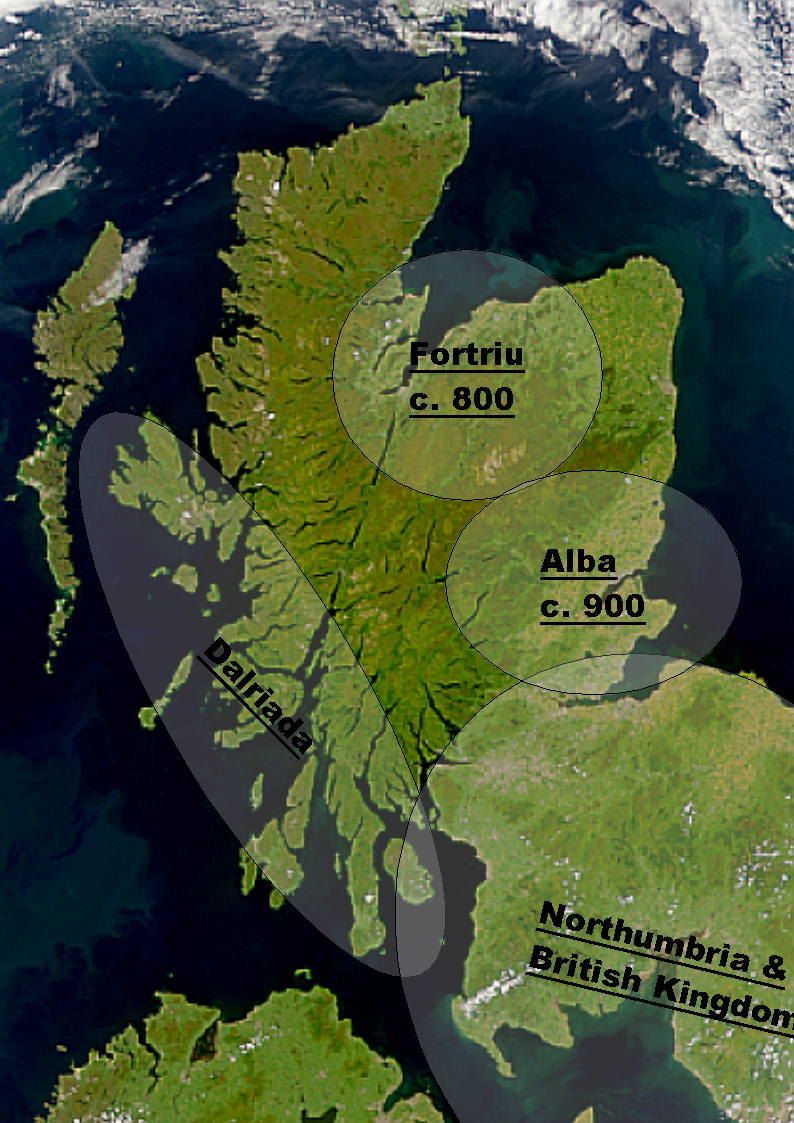
Major political centres in early Medieval Scotland

The roots of Christianity in Scotland were probably among the soldiers and ordinary Roman citizens who lived in the vicinity of Hadrian's Wall. The archaeology of the Roman period indicates that the northern parts of the Roman province of Britannia were among the most Christianised in the island. Chi-Rho inscriptions and Christian grave-slabs have been found on the wall from the fourth century, and from the same period the Mithraic shrines (known as Mithraea) that existed along Hadrian's Wall were attacked and destroyed, presumably by Christians.

=== Post-Roman kingdoms ===
After the collapse of Roman authority in the early fifth century, four major circles of influence emerged in Northern Britain. In the east, the kingdoms of the Picts eventually stretched from the River Forth to Shetland. In the west were the Gaelic (Goidelic)-speaking people of Dál Riata, who had close links with Ireland, from where they brought with them the name Scots. In the south were the British (Brythonic-speaking) descendants of the peoples of the Roman-influenced kingdoms of "The Old North", the most powerful and longest surviving of which was Alt Clut. Finally, the Anglo-Saxons had overrun much of southern Britain and held the Kingdom of Bernicia (later the northern part of Northumbria), which reached into what are now the Borders of Scotland in the south-east.

While the Picts and Scots would have remained pagan, most scholars presume that Christianity would have survived after the departure of the Romans among the Brythonic enclaves and retreated as the Anglo-Saxons advanced north. Their gods included Tiw, Woden, Thor and Frig, all of whom gave their names to days of the week, and Eostre, whose name was appropriated for the spring festival of Easter. While British Christians continued to practice inhumation without grave goods, the pagan Anglo-Saxons are visible in the archaeological record from their practice of cremation and burial in urns, accompanied by extensive grave goods, perhaps designed to accompany the dead to the afterlife. However, despite growing evidence of Anglian settlement in southern Scotland, only one such grave has been found, at Dalmeny in East Lothian.

== Early spread and missions ==
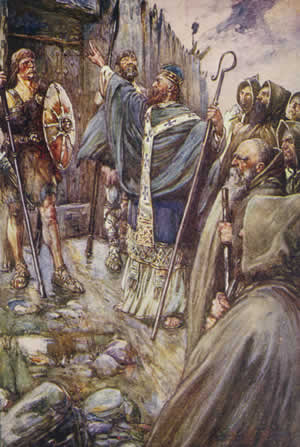
A nineteenth-century painting, showing the traditional, dramatic role of St. Columba in the conversion

The traditional view of the Christianisation of Scotland has seen it as carried out by Irish-Scots missionaries and to a lesser extent those from Rome and England. Historian Richard Fletcher argued that motivations for these missions may have included the example of St. Patrick, the idea of Peregrinatio and a growing interest in evangelism. Missionaries from Ireland were operating on the British mainland from at least the sixth century. This movement is traditionally associated with the figures of St. Ninian, St. Kentigern and St. Columba. However, historian Gilbert Markus highlights the fact that most of these figures were not church-founders, but were usually active in areas where Christianity had already become established, probably through gradual diffusion that is almost invisible in the historical record. This would have included trade, conquest and intermarriage.

=== Britons ===
Most scholars agree that the place-name element eccles-, from the Brythonic word for church, represents evidence of the British church of the Roman and immediate post-Roman period. In Scotland most of these are located in the south of the country in the area of the British successor states that would be known as the Hen Ogledd, or the Old North. From the fifth and sixth centuries, inscribed stones indicate Christianity through their dedications and are spread across southern Scotland. The earliest is the so-called Latinus stone of Whithorn, dating to around 450. A slightly later stone at Kirkmadrine commemorates sacerdotes, which may be bishops. Among the key indicators of Christianisation are cemeteries containing long cists, which are generally east–west in orientation, like Christian graves. These cemeteries are suspected, or known to be Christian, because of their proximity to a church, or because they have Christian inscriptions. They are found from between the end of the Roman era in the early fifth century and the twelfth century. They are concentrated strongly in eastern Scotland south of the River Tay, in the modern East and Borders of Scotland. Writing in the sixth century, St. Patrick also mentioned Coroticus, who probably ruled from the fort at Dumbarton rock and who had already accepted Christianity. The poem Y Gododdin, set in the early sixth century and probably written in what is now Scotland, indicates that the warriors of Gododdin, probably a kingdom based the site of modern Edinburgh, were Christian, receiving communion and confessing their sins before battle.

The figure of St. Ninian, traditionally credited with introducing Christianity to the region of south-west Scotland, is now widely regarded as a later construct and may have been the result of scribal confusion with the Irish saint Finnian. The church known as Candida Casa was dedicated to him at Whithorn in the sixth century and from there St Kentigern seems to have created a new centre of worship at Govan or Inchinnan, which would extend an influence across the Strathclyde region. However, it is clear that Christianity had already gained a foothold across what is now southern Scotland before the sixth century.

=== Gaels ===
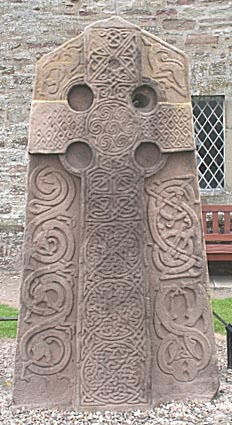
The Class II Kirkyard stone c. 800 AD from Aberlemno

The conversion of the Gaelic kingdom of Dál Riata in the west of modern Scotland is traditionally attributed to the work of St. Columba. However, given the close cultural and linguistic ties, and the short distance across the seas, between the region and Ireland, which had begun to be Christianised from at least the fifth century, it is likely that Christianity had already reached this part of modern Scotland before his arrival in the mid-sixth century. In this view, the role of clergy owing their loyalty to Iona and elsewhere was to consolidate the position of Christianity in the region and beyond and to provide pastoral care for the people there.

St Columba was probably a disciple of Finnian. He left Ireland after being exiled, and founded the monastery at Iona off the west coast of Scotland in 563, probably on land granted from a Christian king. From there missions were carried out to western Argyll and the islands around Mull. Later the influence of Iona would extend to the Hebrides. Iona emerged as the most important religious centre in the north of Britain, partly as a result of the work of Adomnan, who was abbot there from 679 to 704. Although it is unclear whether the historic Columba did conduct missions outside of a small part of Dál Riata, Adoman's Life of St. Columba elevated him to become the apostle of North Britain in general.

=== Picts ===
The means and speed by which the Picts converted to Christianity is uncertain. Bede gives the credit for the conversion to Ninian, probably because in the eighth century, when Bede was writing, the Anglo-Saxon kingdom of Northumbria was in control of the south-west of Scotland and an English bishop was in possession of the see that theoretically had been Ninian's. Bede may have been reminding the Pictish church of its allegiance. Adomnan stresses the role of Columba in Pictland, and although the saint may have visited the region, since Adomnan does not make any claims for conversion, it is unlikely that the saint had any major impact. A separate mission, that may have been an attempt to evangelise the north-east, was undertaken by Columba's younger contemporary, another Irish priest, Donnán of Eigg, who had a large number of churches dedicated in his name in the region.

The process of conversion may have begun earlier than traditional mission-based narratives. It is likely that knowledge of Christianity reached the region from Dál Riata, with which it had close contacts, including war, trade and intermarriage. Traditions place the fifth-century saint Palladius in Pictland after he left Ireland, and link Abernethy with his contemporary, Saint Brigid of Kildare. Evidence for an early date for Christianisation include the fact that St. Patrick, active in the fifth century, referred in a letter to "apostate Picts", indicating that they had previously been Christian, but had abandoned the faith. In addition the poem Y Gododdin does not remark on the Picts as pagans. Recent archaeological work at Portmahomack places the foundation of the monastery there, an area once assumed to be among the last converted, in the late sixth century. In the east and north, Class II Pictish stones began to show Christian symbolism from the early eighth century. Conversion of the Pictish élite is assessed to have taken place over a considerable period, beginning in the fifth century and not complete until the seventh. Conversion of the general population may have stretched into the eighth century. The evidence of place names suggests a wide area of Ionan influence in Pictland, where there are large numbers of dedications of churches to Iona abbots of the seventh century.

=== Anglo-Saxons ===
In the seventh century, St. Aidan (died 651) went from Iona to found a church at Lindisfarne off the east coast of Northumbria. The influence of Lindisfarne would spread through the kingdom of Northumbria into what is now south-east Scotland. However, in the second half of the century, the Northumbrian church was increasingly influenced by the Roman form of Christianity. The careers of St. Wilfred (active from the 660s until his death in 709), abbot of the monastery at Ripon and Bishop of Northumbria, and Benedict Biscop (c. 628–690), founder of the monasteries of Jarrow and Wearmouth, intensified ties with Rome. A bishopric established at Abercorn in the region of West Lothian, is presumed to have adopted Roman forms of Christianity after the Synod of Whitby in 664, at which King Oswiu of Northumbria accepted the arguments for Roman authority and practices. However, the Pictish victory at the Battle of Dunnichen in 685 ended the Northumbrian dominance of the region and the bishop and his followers were ejected.

== Controversies ==
=== Celtic Christianity ===
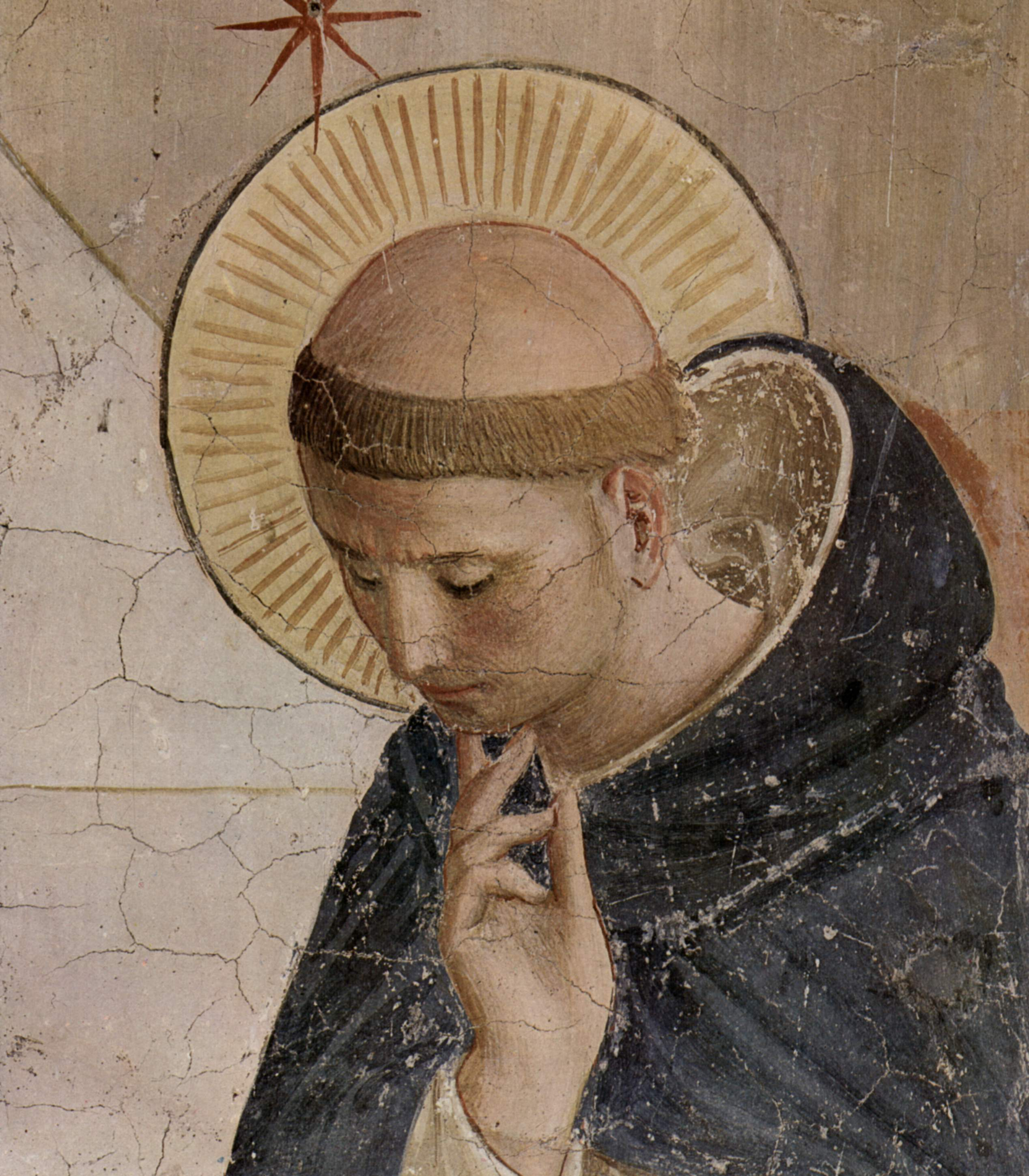
The "Roman" tonsure: in the Irish tradition the hair above the forehead was shaved

The result of different missions and forms of conversion was a series of overlapping and informally organised churches. In the past historians used the term Celtic Church to describe a specific form of Christianity with its origins in the conversion of Ireland, traditionally associated with St. Patrick and which later spread to northern Britain through Iona. It is also used as a general description for the Christian establishment of northern Britain prior to the twelfth century, when new religious institutions and ideologies of primarily French origin began to take root in Scotland. The Celtic form of Christianity has been contrasted with that derived from missions from Rome, which reached southern England in 587 under the leadership of St. Augustine of Canterbury. Subsequent missions from Canterbury then helped convert the Anglo-Saxon kingdoms, reaching Northumbria in the early eighth century, where Iona had already begun to have a presence. As a result, Christianity in Northumbria became a mix of Celtic and Roman influences.

While Roman and Celtic Christianity were very similar in doctrine and both accepted ultimate papal authority, there were differences in practice. The most contentious were the method of calculating Easter, and the form of head shaving for priests known as tonsure. Other differences were in the rites of ordination and baptism, and in the form of service of the liturgy. In addition scholars have identified significant characteristics of the organisation of Irish and Scottish Christianity as relaxed ideas of clerical celibacy, intense secularisation of ecclesiastical institutions, and the lack of a diocesan structure. This made abbots (or coarbs), rather than bishops, the most important element the church hierarchy.

=== Growth of Roman influence ===
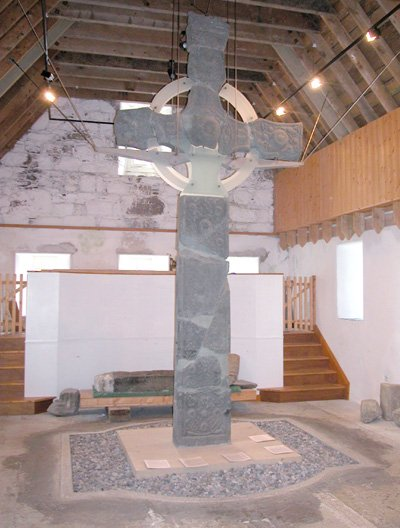
St. John's cross which stood outside Iona Abbey

Wilfred was the major spokesman for the Roman case at the Synod of Whitby in 664, which was called by King Oswiu of Northumbria to decide which form of observance would be used in his kingdom, and where he decided in favour of the Roman form of tonsure and of calculating Easter. Although this only affected Anglo-Saxon Northumbria, from this point the distinctiveness of Celtic Christianity declined. Nechtan mac Der-Ilei, king of the Picts from 706, seems to have attempted to establish links with the church in Northumbria. Before 714 he wrote to Ceolfrith, abbot of Wearmouth, asking for a formal refutation of the Irish position over the calculation of the date of Easter and for help in building a stone church "in the manner of the Romans". Historian A. A. M. Duncan has suggested that there was a "Romanising group" among Nechtan's clergy, perhaps led by Bishop Curitan, who took the name Latin name Boniface. This is also suggested by the presence of a church at Rosemarkie in Ross and Cromarty, dedicated to St. Peter, seen as the first Bishop of Rome, by the early eighth century, and subsequent similar dedications in Pictish territory. By the mid-eighth century, Iona and Ireland had accepted Roman practices.

=== Decline of Iona ===
Iona's place as the centre of Scottish Christianity was disrupted by the arrival of the Vikings, first as raiders, then as conquerors. Iona was sacked by them in 795 and 802. In 806, 68 monks were killed and the next year the abbot withdrew to Kells in Ireland, taking the relics of St. Columba with him. There were periodic returns of abbots and relics, often ending in more massacres. Orkney, Shetland, Western Isles and the Hebrides eventually fell to the pagan Norsemen, curtailing the influence of the church in the Highlands and Islands. The threat posed by the Vikings may have forced a union between the kingdoms of Dál Riata and the Picts under Kenneth mac Alpin, traditionally dated to 843. In 849, according to the Annals of Ulster, the abbot of Iona once again took Columba's relics to Ireland, but the earliest version of the Chronicles of the Kings of Scots says that in the same year they were removed by Kenneth mac Alpin, to a church he had built, probably at Dunkeld, perhaps indicating that the relics were divided. The abbot of the new monastery at Dunkeld emerged as the Bishop of the new combined Kingdom of Alba, which would subsequently come to be known as the Kingdom of Scotland.

== Conversion of Scandinavian Scotland ==
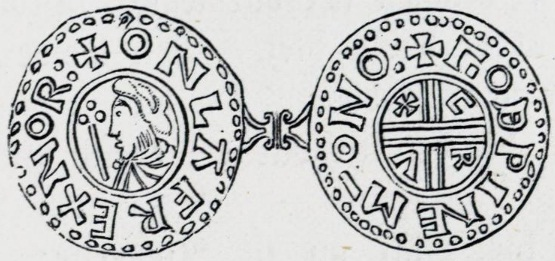
A coin of Olav Tryggvasson, who is credited with the Christianistion of the Northern Isles

While the official conversion of Scandinavian Scotland took place at the end of the tenth century, there is evidence that Christianity had already made inroads into the Viking controlled Highland and Islands. There are a large number of isles called Pabbay or Papa in the Western and Northern Isles, which may indicate a "hermit's" or "priest's isle" from this period. Changes in patterns of grave goods and Viking place names using -kirk also suggest that Christianity had begun to spread before the official conversion. According to the Orkneyinga Saga, not written down until around 1230, the Northern Isles were Christianised by Olav Tryggvasson, king of Norway, in 995 when he stopped at South Walls on his way from Ireland to Norway. The King summoned the local jarl Sigurd the Stout and said "I order you and all your subjects to be baptised. If you refuse, I'll have you killed on the spot and I swear I will ravage every island with fire and steel". The story may be apocryphal, but the islands became officially Christian, receiving their own bishop in the early eleventh century. The bishopric appears to have been under the authority of the Archbishops of York and of Hamburg-Bremen at different points before the twelfth century and from then until 1472 it was subordinate to the Archbishop of Nidaros (today's Trondheim). Elsewhere in Scandinavian Scotland the record is less clear. There was a Bishop of Iona until the late tenth century, followed by a gap of more than a century, possibly filled by the Bishops of Orkney, before the appointment of the first Bishop of Mann in 1079. One of the major effects of the conversion of the Vikings was to bring an end to plundering raids on Christian sites, which may have allowed them to recover some of their status as cultural and intellectual centres. It also probably curbed the excesses of Viking violence and led to a more settled society in northern Scotland.

== Significance ==
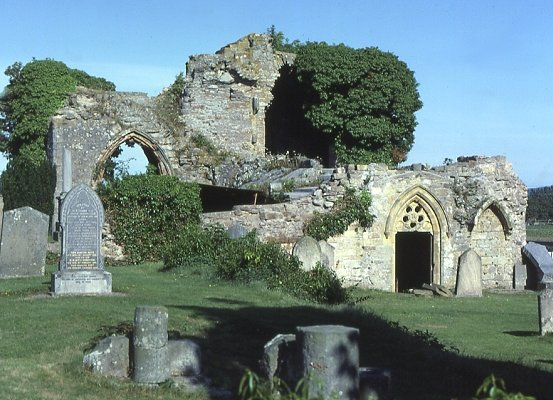
Kinloss Abbey, one of the Scottish monasteries that had a major educational role

The Christianisation of Scotland brought the country into the cultural mainstream of Europe. When the Kingdom of Alba emerged in the ninth century it would be an overtly Christian kingdom and, despite its cultural diversity, religion would be a major source of Scottish identity. The Canmore dynasty that would rule Scotland from the eleventh century to the end of the thirteenth identified itself with Christianity and a strong relationship emerged between the crown and church. The acceptance of papal authority meant that in subsequent centuries the Scottish church faced claims for superior jurisdiction from the archbishoprics of both Canterbury and York and the independent status of Scotland in ecclesiastic matters would only be established by the papal bull of Cum universi in 1192.

Scottish monasticism also played a major part in the Hiberno-Scottish mission, by which Scottish and Irish clergy undertook missions to the expanding Frankish Empire. They founded monasteries, often called Schottenklöster (meaning Gaelic monasteries in German), most of which became Benedictine establishments in what is now Germany. Scottish monks, such as St. Cathróe of Metz, became local saints in the region. After the conversion of the Picts and the assimilation of Pictish culture into that of the Scots and Angles a common artistic style emerged in Britain and Ireland, known as Insular art. Surviving examples are found in metalwork and carving, but mainly in illuminated manuscripts, highly decorated with intricate patterning, like the Book of Kells—which may have been wholly or partly created in Iona. Insular art became highly influential in continental Europe, contributing to the development of Romanesque and Gothic styles. The establishment of Christianity brought Latin to Scotland as a scholarly and written language. Monasteries served as major repositories of knowledge and education, often running schools and providing a small educated elite, who were essential to create and read documents in a largely illiterate society.

== See also ==
- Christianisation of Anglo-Saxon England

== Bibliography ==
- Alcock, L., Kings and Warriors, Craftsmen and Priests in Northern Britain AD 550–850 (Edinburgh: Society of Antiquaries of Scotland), ISBN 0-903903-24-5.
- Barrow, G. W. S., "The childhood of Scottish Christianity: a note on some place-name evidence", Scottish Studies, 27 (1983), pp. 1–15.
- Brooks, N., Anglo-Saxon Myths: State and Church, 400–1066 (London: Continuum, 2000), ISBN 1-85285-154-6.
- Burns, W. E., A Brief History of Great Britain (New York, NY: Infobase Publishing, 2009), ISBN 0-8160-7728-2.
- Adrian, Maldono. "What does early Christianity look like? Mortuary archaeology and conversion in Late Iron Age Scotland." Scottish Archaeological Journal no. 1/2 (2011): 39. JSTOR Journals
- Carver, M. O. H., Portmahomack: Monastery of the Picts (Edinburgh: Edinburgh University Press, 2008), ISBN 0748624422.
- Clancy, O., "The Scottish provenance of the ‘Nennian’ recension of Historia Brittonum and the Lebor Bretnach" in: S. Taylor, ed., Picts, Kings, Saints and Chronicles: A Festschrift for Marjorie O. Anderson (Dublin: Four Courts, 2000).
- Clancy, T. O., "The real St Ninian", The Innes Review, 52 (2001).
- Corning, C., The Celtic and Roman Traditions: Conflict and Consensus in the Early Medieval Church (London: Macmillan, 2006), ISBN 1403972990.
- Crawford, B. E., Scandinavian Scotland (Leicester: Leicester University Press, 1987), ISBN 0-7185-128-20.
- Bitel, Lisa M. "Christians and Pagans: The Conversion of Britain from Alban to Bede." Church History 80, no. 3
- Crawford, B. E., (ed.), Scotland In Dark Age Britain St. Andrews. St. John's House Papers no. 6 (1996).
- Crawford, B. E., (ed.), Conversion And Christianity In The North Sea World St. Andrews. St. John's House Papers no. 8 (1998).
- Bitel, Lisa M. "Christians and Pagans: The Conversion of Britain from Alban to Bede." Church History 80, no. 3 (September 2011): 642.
- Cunliffe, B., The Ancient Celts (Oxford: Oxford University Press, 1997), ISBN 0-14-025422-6.
- Davies, O., Celtic Spirituality (Mahwah, NJ: Paulist Press, 1999), ISBN 0809138948.
- Blagg, T. F. C. Hadrian's Wall. n.p: Oxford University Press, 1996. Grove Art Online
- Dodwell, C. R., The Pictorial Arts of the West, 800–1200 (Yale UP, 1993), ISBN 0300064934.
- Dumville, D. N., "St Cathróe of Metz and the Hagiography of Exoticism," in J. Carey, et al., eds, Irish Hagiography: Saints and Scholars (Dublin, 2001).
- Dunbavin, P., Picts and Ancient Britons: an Exploration of Pictish Origins (Third Millennium Publishing, 1998), ISBN 0-9525029-1-7.
- Evans, C., "The Celtic Church in Anglo-Saxon times", in J. D. Woods, D. A. E. Pelteret, The Anglo-Saxons, Synthesis and Achievement (Waterloo, Ontario: Wilfrid Laurier University Press, 1985), ISBN 0889201668.
- Fletcher, R. A., The Barbarian Conversion: From Paganism to Christianity (University of California Press, 1999), ISBN 0520218590.
- Foster, S., Picts, Gaels and Scots: Early Historic Scotland (London: Birlinn, 2004), ISBN 0713488743.
- Fraser, J. E., From Caledonia to Pictland: Scotland to 795 (Edinburgh: Edinburgh University Press, 2009), ISBN 0748612327.
- H. J. Lawlor, author. "The Pictish Nation; Its People and Its Church Archibald B. Scott." The English Historical Review no. 135 (1919): 419
- Henderson, G., Early Medieval Art
- Honour, H., and Fleming, J., A World History of Art (London: Macmillan, 7 edn., 2009), ISBN 0-333-37185-2.
- Hutton, R., Blood and Mistletoe: The History of the Druids in Britain (Yale University Press, 2009), ISBN 0-300-14485-7.
- Laing, L. R., The Archaeology of Celtic Britain and Ireland, c. AD 400–1200 (Cambridge: Cambridge University Press, 2006), ISBN 0-521-54740-7.
- Macquarrie, A., Medieval Scotland: Kinship and Nation (Thrupp: Sutton, 2004), ISBN 0-7509-2977-4.
- Maddicott, J. R., and Palliser, D. M., eds, The Medieval State: Essays presented to James Campbell (London: Continuum, 2000), ISBN 1-85285-195-3.
- Markus, G., "Conversion to Christianity", in M. Lynch, ed., The Oxford Companion to Scottish History (Oxford: Oxford University Press, 2001), ISBN 0-19-211696-7.
- Mitchison, R., A History of Scotland (London: Routledge, 3rd edn., 2002), ISBN 0-415-27880-5.
- Proudfoot, E., "Archaeology and Early Christianity in Scotland", in E. H. Nicol, ed., A Pictish Panorama (Balgavies, Angus: Pinkfoot Press, 1995), ISBN 1874012105.
- Proudfoot, E., "The Hallow Hill and the Origins of Christianity in Eastern Scotland", in B. E. Crawford, ed., Conversion and Christianity in the North Sea World: The Proceedings of a Day Conference held on 21st February 1998, St John's House Papers (St. Andrews, University of St. Andrews Press: 1998), ISBN 0951257331.
- Quensel von Kalben, L., "The British Church and the Emergence of the Anglo-Saxon Kingdom", in T. Dickinson and D. Griffiths, eds, Anglo-Saxon Studies in Archaeology and History, 10: Papers for the 47th Sachsensymposium, York, September 1996 (Oxford, 1999), ISBN 0-86054-138-X.
- Ritchie, J. N. G., and Ritchie, A., Scotland, Archaeology and Early History (Edinburgh: Edinburgh University Press, 2nd edn., 1991), ISBN 0748602917.
- Smith, I., "The Origins and Development of Christianity in North Britain and Southern Pictland", in J. Blair and C. Pyrah, eds., Church Archaeology: Research Directions for the Future (York: Council for British Archaeology, 1996), ISBN 1-872414-68-0.
- Smyth, A. P., Warlords and Holy Men: Scotland AD 80–1000 (Edinburgh: Edinburgh University Press, 1989), ISBN 0748601007.
- Taylor, S., "Seventh-century Iona abbots in Scottish place-names", in D. Broun and T. O. Clancy, eds., Spes Scotorum: Hope of Scots. Saint Columba, Iona and the Scotland (Edinburgh: T. & T. Clark, 1999), ISBN 0-567-08682-8.
- Watt, D. E. R., (ed.) (1969) Fasti Ecclesia Scoticanae Medii Aevii ad annum 1638, Scottish Records Society.
- Webster, B.,Medieval Scotland: the Making of an Identity (New York City, NY: St. Martin's Press, 1997), ISBN 0333567617.
- Lee, R., P. Jonathan, and P. Ziman. "Pictish Symbol Stones: Religious imagery, heraldic arms or a language?." Significance7, no. 4
