= Christianity in Medieval Scotland =

Christianity was probably introduced to what is now Lowland Scotland by Roman soldiers stationed in the north of the province of Britannia. After the collapse of Roman authority in the fifth century, Christianity is presumed to have survived among the British enclaves in the south of what is now Scotland, but retreated as the pagan Anglo-Saxons advanced. Scotland was largely converted by Irish missions associated with figures such as St Columba, from the fifth to the seventh centuries. These missions founded monastic institutions and collegiate churches that served large areas. Scholars have identified a distinctive form of Celtic Christianity, in which abbots were more significant than bishops, attitudes to clerical celibacy were more relaxed and there were significant differences in practice with Roman Christianity, particularly the form of tonsure and the method of calculating Easter, although most of these issues had been resolved by the mid-seventh century. After the reconversion of Scandinavian Scotland in the tenth century, Christianity under papal authority was the dominant religion of the kingdom.

In the Norman period, from the eleventh to the thirteenth centuries, the Scottish church underwent a series of reforms and transformations. With royal and lay patronage, a clearer parochial structure based around local churches was developed. Large numbers of new monastic foundations, which followed continental forms of reformed monasticism, began to predominate. The Scottish church also established its independence from England, developing a clear diocesan structure and becoming a "special daughter of the see of Rome", but continued to lack Scottish leadership in the form of archbishops.

In the late Middle Ages the problems of schism in the Catholic Church allowed the Scottish Crown to gain greater influence over senior appointments and two archbishoprics had been established by the end of the fifteenth century. Historians have discerned a decline in traditional monastic life in the late Middle Ages, but the mendicant orders of friars grew, particularly in the expanding burghs, emphasised preaching and ministering to the population. New saints and cults of devotion also proliferated. Despite problems over the number and quality of clergy after the Black Death in the fourteenth century, and evidence of heresy in the fifteenth century, the church in Scotland remained stable before the Reformation in the sixteenth century.

== Early Middle Ages ==
=== Early Christianisation ===
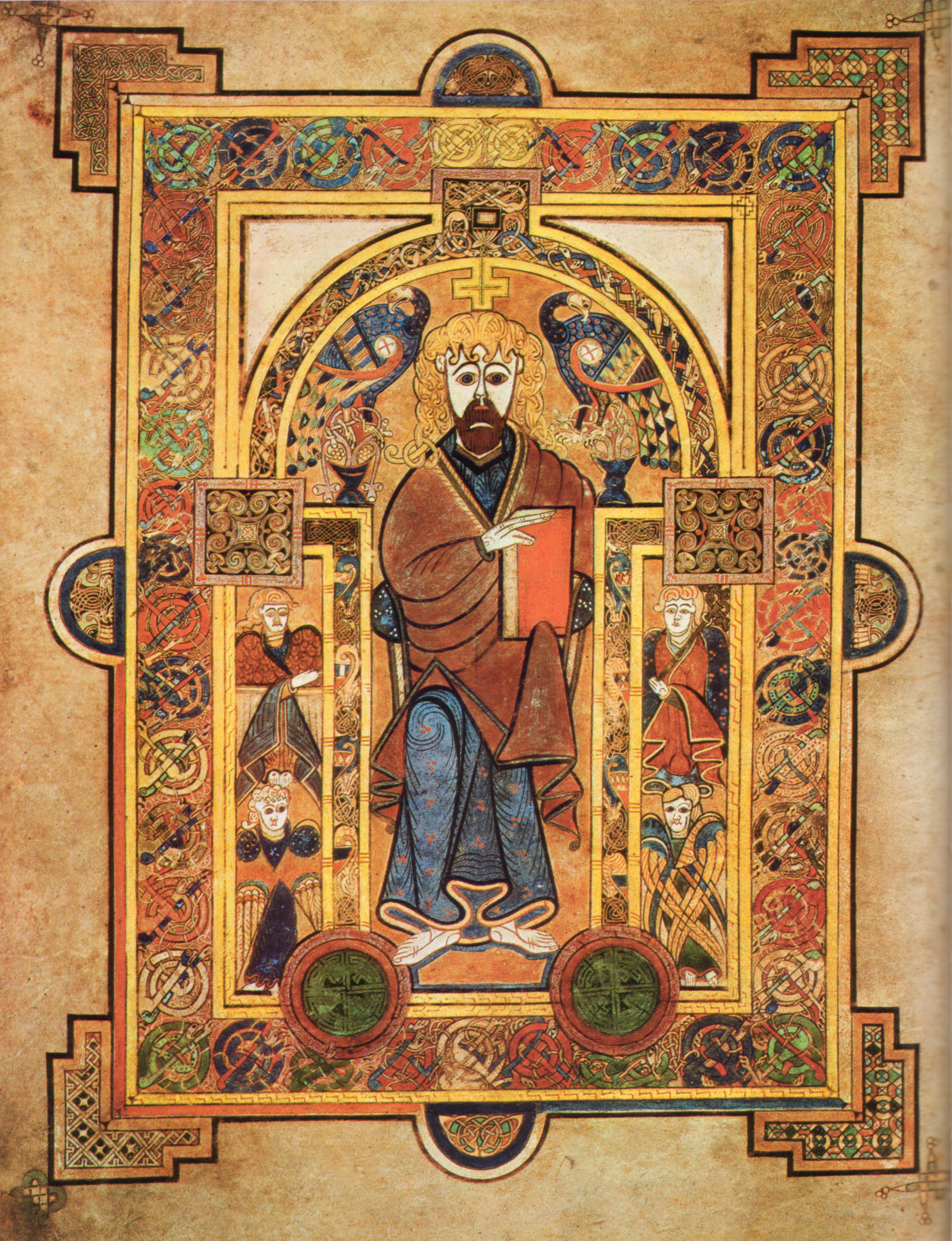
An illuminated page from the Book of Kells, which may have been produced at Iona around 800

Before the Middle Ages, most of the population of what is now Scotland practised a form of Celtic polytheism. Evidence of Christian symbols and the destruction of the shrines of other religions, suggest that Roman occupation brought Christianity to the north of Britannia (the name they gave to the province under their control in the southern part of the island). From there it may have spread to parts of what they called Caledonia (roughly corresponding to what is now Scotland). After the collapse of Roman authority in the early fifth century, four major circles of influence emerged in Northern Britain. In the east were the Picts, whose kingdoms eventually stretched from the river Forth to Shetland. In the west were the Gaelic (Goidelic)-speaking people of Dál Riata, who had close links with Ireland, from where they brought with them the name Scots. In the south were the British (Brythonic-speaking) descendants of the peoples of the Roman-influenced kingdoms of "The Old North", the most powerful and longest surviving of which was the Kingdom of Strathclyde. Finally, there were the English or "Angles", Germanic invaders who had overrun much of southern Britain and held the Kingdom of Bernicia (later the northern part of Northumbria), which reached into what are now the Borders of Scotland in the south-east. While the Picts and Scots would have remained pagan, most scholars presume that Christianity would have survived after the departure of the Romans among the Brythonic enclaves, but retreated as the pagan Anglo-Saxons advanced.

The Christianisation of Scotland was carried out by Irish-Scots missionaries and to a lesser extent those from Rome and England. Richard Fletcher argued that motivations may have included the example of St. Patrick, the idea of Peregrinatio and a growing interest in evangelism. In the sixth century missionaries from Ireland were operating on the British mainland. This movement is traditionally associated with the figures of St Ninian, St Kentigern and St Columba. Ninian is now regarded as a later construct and may have been the result of scribal confusion with the Irish saint Finnian. There was a church dedicated to him at Whithorn in the sixth century and from there St Kentigern seems to have created a new centre of worship at Govan or Inchinnan, from where Christian influence extended across the Strathclyde region. St Columba was probably a disciple of Finnian. He left Ireland after being exiled, and founded the monastery at Iona off the west coast of Scotland in 563. From there missions were carried out to western Argyll and the islands around Mull. Later the influence of Iona would extend to the Hebrides. In the seventh century, St. Aidan went from Iona to found a church at Lindisfarne off the east coast of Northumbria. The influence of Lindisfarne would spread through the kingdom of Northumbria into what is now south-east Scotland. The result was a series of overlapping and informally organised churches. Iona emerged as the most important religious centre, partly as a result of the work of Adomnan, who was abbot there from 679 to 704. Although it is unclear whether the historic Columba did conduct missions outside of a small part of Dál Riata, Adomnan's Life of St. Columba elevated him to become the apostle of North Britain in general.

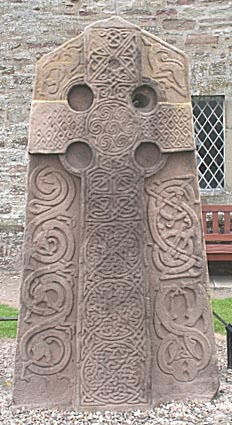
The Class II Kirkyard stone c. 800 AD from Aberlemno

The means and speed by which the Picts converted to Christianity is uncertain. The process may have begun early. Evidence for this includes the fact that St. Patrick, active in the fifth century, referred in a letter to "apostate Picts", indicating that they had previously been Christian, but had abandoned the faith. In addition the poem Y Gododdin, set in the early sixth century and probably written in what is now Scotland, does not remark on the Picts as pagans. Conversion of the Pictish élite seems likely to have run over a considerable period, beginning in the fifth century and not complete until the seventh and conversion of the general population may have stretched into the eighth century.

Among the key indicators of Christianisation are cemeteries containing long cists which are generally east–west in orientation. These cemeteries are suspected, or known to be Christian, because of their proximity to a church, or because of Christian inscriptions found in them. They are found for between the end of the Roman era in the early fifth century and the twelfth century. They are concentrated strongly in eastern Scotland south of the River Tay, in the modern East and Borders of Scotland. Most scholars agree that the place-name element eccles-, from the Brythonic word for church, represents evidence of the British church of the Roman and immediate post-Roman period. Most of these in Scotland are located in the south of the country. From the fifth and sixth centuries, inscribed stones indicate Christianity through their dedications and are spread across southern Scotland. The earliest is the so-called Latinus stone of Whithorn, dating to c. 450. In the east and north, Class II Pictish stones began to show Christian symbolism from the early eighth century.

Early church buildings may originally have been wooden, like that excavated at Whithorn, but of those for which evidence survives from this era are basic masonry-built churches, beginning on the west coast and islands and spreading south and east. Early chapels tended to have square ended converging walls, similar to Irish chapels of this period. Medieval parish church architecture in Scotland was typically much less elaborate than in England, with many churches remaining simple oblongs, without transepts and aisles, and often without towers. In the Highlands they were often even simpler, many built of rubble masonry and sometimes indistinguishable from the outside from houses or farm buildings.

=== Celtic Christianity ===
The Celtic Church is a term that has been used by scholars to describe a specific form of Christianity with its origins in the conversion of Ireland, traditionally associated with St. Patrick. This form of Christianity later spread to northern Britain through Iona. It is also used as a general description for the Christian establishment of northern Britain prior to the twelfth century, when new religious institutions and ideologies of primarily French origin began to take root in Scotland. The Celtic form of Christianity has been contrasted with that derived from missions from Rome, which reached southern England in 587 under the leadership of St. Augustine of Canterbury. Subsequent missions from Canterbury then helped convert the Anglo-Saxon kingdoms, reaching Northumbria in the early eighth century, where Iona had already begun to have a presence. As a result, Christianity in Northumbria became a mix of Celtic and Roman influences.

While Roman and Celtic Christianity were very similar in doctrine and both accepted ultimate papal authority, there were differences in practice. The most contentious were the method of calculating Easter, and the form of head shaving for priests known as tonsure. Other differences were in the rites of ordination and baptism, and in the form of service of the liturgy. In addition scholars have identified significant characteristics of the organisation of Irish and Scottish Christianity as relaxed ideas of clerical celibacy, intense secularisation of ecclesiastical institutions, and the lack of a diocesan structure. This made abbots (or coarbs), rather than bishops, the most important element the church hierarchy.

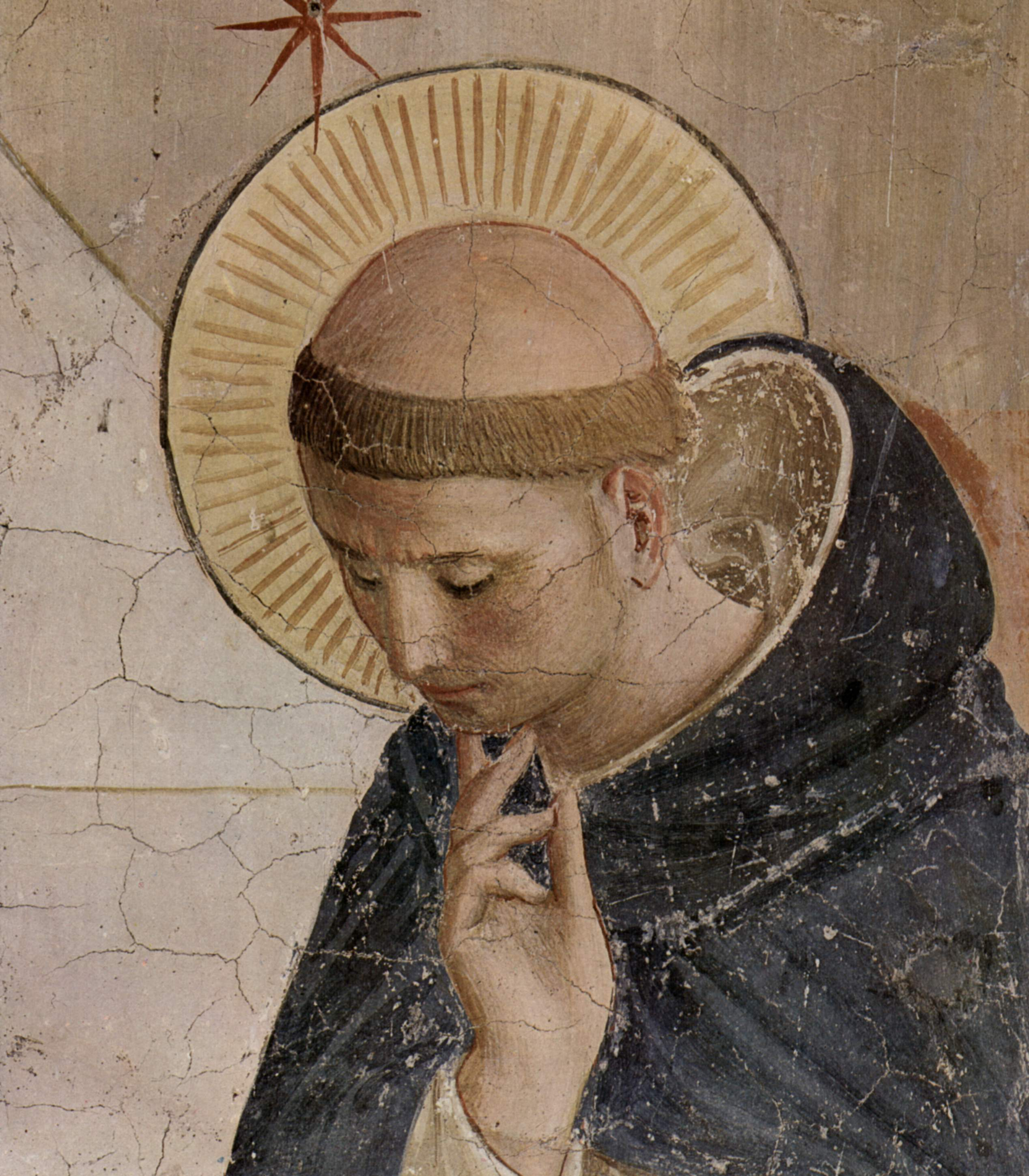
The "Roman" tonsure: in the Irish tradition the hair above the forehead was shaved

In the seventh century the Northumbrian church was increasingly influenced by the Roman form of Christianity. The careers of St. Wilfred (active from the 660s until his death in 709), abbot of the monastery at Ripon and Bishop of Northumbria, and Benedict Biscop (c. 628–690), founder of the monasteries of Jarrow and Wearmouth, intensified ties with Rome. Wilfred was the major spokesman for the Roman case at the Synod of Whitby in 664, which was called by king Oswiu of Northumbria to decide which form of observance would be used in his kingdom, and where he decided in favour of the Roman form of tonsure and of calculating Easter. In this period the Kingdom of Northumbria was expanding into what is now Lowland Scotland. A bishopric established at Abercorn in the region of West Lothian, is presumed to have adopted Roman forms of Christianity after the Synod of Whitby. However, the Pictish victory at the Battle of Dunnichen in 685, ended the Northumbrian dominance of the region and the Bishop and his followers were ejected. Nechtan mac Der-Ilei, king of the Picts from 706, seems to have attempted to establish links with the church in Northumbria. Before 714 he wrote to Ceolfrith, abbot of Wearmouth, asking for a formal refutation of the Irish position over the calculation of the date of Easter and for help in building a stone church "in the manner of the Romans". A. A. M. Duncan has suggested that there was a "Romanising group" among Nechtan's clergy, perhaps led by Bishop Curitan, who took the name Latin name Boniface. This is also suggested by the presence of a church at Rosemarkie in Ross and Cromarty, dedicated to St Peter, seen as the first Bishop of Rome, by the early eighth century, and subsequent similar dedications in Pictish territory.

By the mid-eighth century, Iona and Ireland had accepted Roman practices. Iona's place as the centre of Scottish Christianity was disrupted by the arrival of the Vikings, first as raiders, then as conquerors. Iona was sacked by Vikings 795 and 802. In 806 68 monks were killed and the next year the abbot withdrew to Kells in Ireland, taking the relics of St. Columba with him. There were periodic returns of abbots and relics, often ending in more massacres. Orkney, Shetland, Western Isles and the Hebrides eventually fell to the Pagan Norsemen, curtailing the influence of the church in the Highlands and Islands. The threat posed by the Vikings may have forced a union between the kingdoms of Dál Riata and the Picts under Kenneth mac Alpin, traditionally dated to 843. In 849, according to the Annals of Ulster the abbot of Iona once again took Columba's relics to Ireland, but the earliest version of the Chronicles of the Kings of Scots says that in the same year they were removed by Kenneth mac Alpin, to a church he had built, probably at Dunkeld, perhaps indicating that the relics were divided. The abbot of the new monastery at Dunkeld emerged as the Bishop of the new combined Kingdom of Alba, which would subsequently come to be known as the Kingdom of Scotland.

=== Early monasticism ===
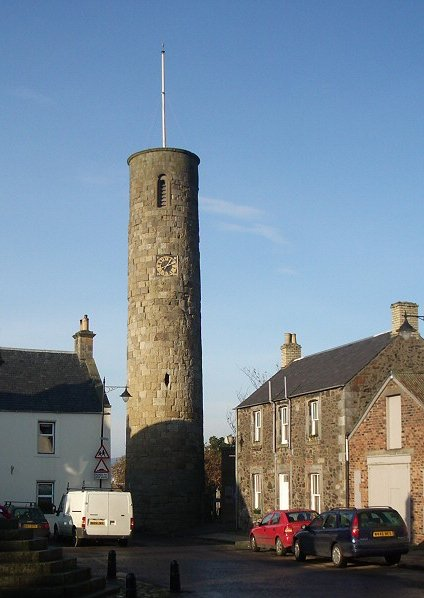
Abernethy round tower, c. 1100, demonstrates the influence of Irish architecture on Scottish monasteries

While there were a series of reforms of monasticism in continental Europe and England, particularly those associated with Cluny in France from the tenth century, Scotland remained largely unaffected these until the late eleventh century. Physically Scottish monasteries differed significantly from those on the continent, and were often an isolated collection of wooden huts surrounded by a wall. The Irish architectural influence can be seen in surviving round towers at Brechin and Abernethy. Some early Scottish establishments had dynasties of abbots, who were often secular clergy with families, most famously at Dunkeld and Brechin; but these also existed across Scotland north of the Forth, as at Portmahomack, Mortlach, and Abernethy. Perhaps in reaction to this secularisation, a reforming movement of monks called Céli Dé (lit. "vassals of God"), anglicised as culdees, began in Ireland and spread to Scotland in the late eighth and early ninth centuries. Some Céli Dé took vows of chastity and poverty and while some lived individually as hermits, others lived beside or within existing monasteries. In most cases, even after the introduction of new forms of reformed monasticism from the eleventh century, these Céli Dé were not replaced and the tradition continued in parallel with the new foundations until the thirteenth century.

Scottish monasticism played a major part in the Hiberno-Scottish mission, by which Scottish and Irish clergy undertook missions to the expanding Frankish Empire. They founded monasteries, often called Schottenklöster (meaning Gaelic monasteries in German), most of which became Benedictine establishments in what is now Germany. Scottish monks, such as St Cathróe of Metz, became local saints in the region.

== High Middle Ages ==
=== Conversion of Scandinavian Scotland ===
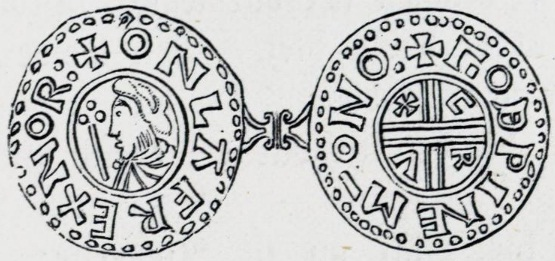
A coin of Olav Tryggvasson, who is credited with the Christianisation of the Northern Isles

While the official conversion of Scandinavian Scotland took place at the end of the tenth century, there is evidence that Christianity had already made inroads into the Viking controlled Highland and Islands. There are a large number of isles called Pabbay or Papa in the Western and Northern Isles, which may indicate a "hermit's" or "priest's isle" from this period. Changes in patterns of grave goods and Viking place names using -kirk also suggest that the Christianity had begun to spread before the official conversion. According to the Orkneyinga Saga, not written down until around 1230, the Northern Isles were Christianised by Olav Tryggvasson, king of Norway, in 995 when he stopped at South Walls on his way from Ireland to Norway. The King summoned the local jarl Sigurd the Stout and said "I order you and all your subjects to be baptised. If you refuse, I'll have you killed on the spot and I swear I will ravage every island with fire and steel". The story may be apocryphal, but the islands became officially Christian, receiving their own bishop in the early eleventh century. The bishopric appears to have been under the authority of the Archbishops of York and of Hamburg-Bremen at different points before the twelfth century and from then until 1472 it was subordinate to the Archbishop of Nidaros (today's Trondheim). Elsewhere in Scandinavian Scotland the record is less clear. There was a Bishop of Iona until the late tenth century, followed by a gap of more than a century, possibly filled by the Bishops of Orkney, before the appointment of the first Bishop of Mann in 1079. One of the major effects of the conversion of the Vikings was to bring an end to plundering raids on Christian sites, which may have allowed them to recover some of their status as cultural and intellectual centres. It also probably curbed the excesses of Viking violence and led to a more settled society in northern Scotland.

=== Reformed monasticism ===
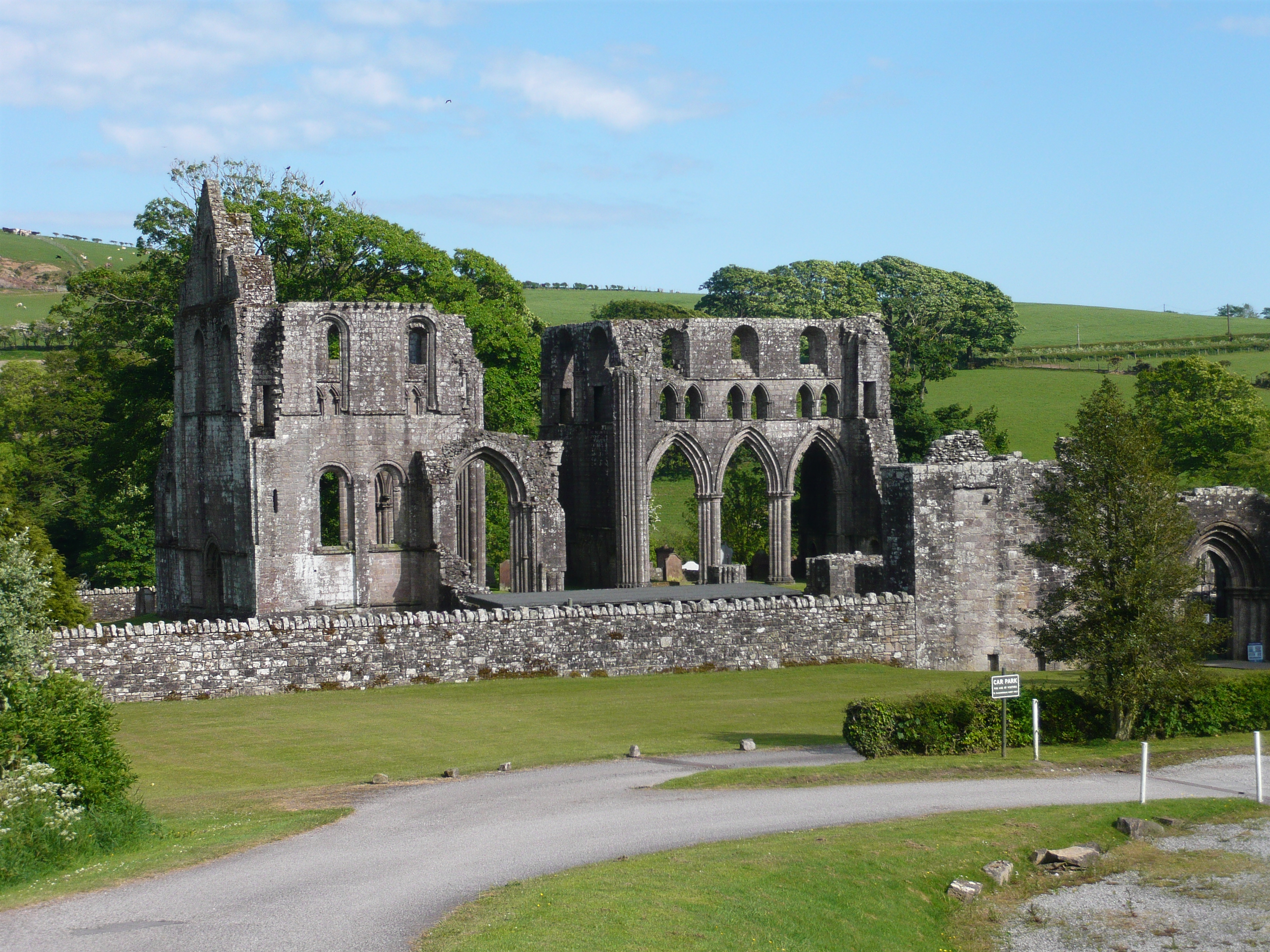
Dundrennan Abbey, one of the many foundations of the twelfth century

The introduction of continental forms of monasticism to Scotland is associated with Saxon princess Queen Margaret (c. 1045–93), the second wife of Máel Coluim III (r. 1058–93), although her exact role is unclear. It is known that she was in communication with Lanfranc, Archbishop of Canterbury, and he provided a few monks for a new Benedictine abbey at Dunfermline (c. 1070). Subsequent foundations under Margaret's sons, Edgar (r. 1097–1107), Alexander (r. 1107–24) and particularly David I (r. 1124–53), tended to be of the reformed type that followed the lead set by Cluny Abbey in the Loire from the late tenth century. Most belonged to the new religious orders that originated in France in the eleventh and twelfth centuries. These stressed the original Benedictine virtues, but also contemplation and service of the Mass and were followed in various forms by reformed Benedictine, Augustinian and Cistercian houses. This period also saw the introduction of more sophisticated forms of church architecture that had become common on the Continent and in England, known collectively as Romanesque. These used rectangular ashlar blocks that allowed massive reinforced walls and round arches that could bear the weight of rounded barrel vault roofs and could incorporate refined architectural moulding and detailing.

The Augustinians, dedicated to the Order of Saint Augustine and founded in northern Italy in the eleventh century, established their first priory in Scotland at Scone, with the sponsorship by Alexander I in 1115. By the early thirteenth century Augustinians had settled alongside, taken over or reformed Céli Dé establishments at St Andrews, St Serf's Inch, Inchcolm, Inchmahome, Inchaffray, Restenneth and Iona, and had created numerous new establishments, such as Holyrood Abbey. The Cistercians, originating from the village of Cîteaux, near Dijon in eastern France, achieved two important Scottish foundations, at Melrose (1136) and Dundrennan (1142), and the Tironensians, named after the location of the mother abbey Tiron Abbey near Chartres in France, achieved foundations at Selkirk, then Kelso, Arbroath, Lindores and Kilwinning. Cluniacs founded an abbey at Paisley, the Premonstratensians, originating at Prémontré near Laon in Picardy, had foundations at Whithorn and the Valliscaulians, named after their first monastery at Val-des-Choux in Burgundy, at Pluscarden. The military orders entered Scotland under David I, with the Knights Templer founding Balantrodoch in Midlothian and the Knights Hospitallers being given Torphichen, West Lothian.

=== Cult of Saints ===
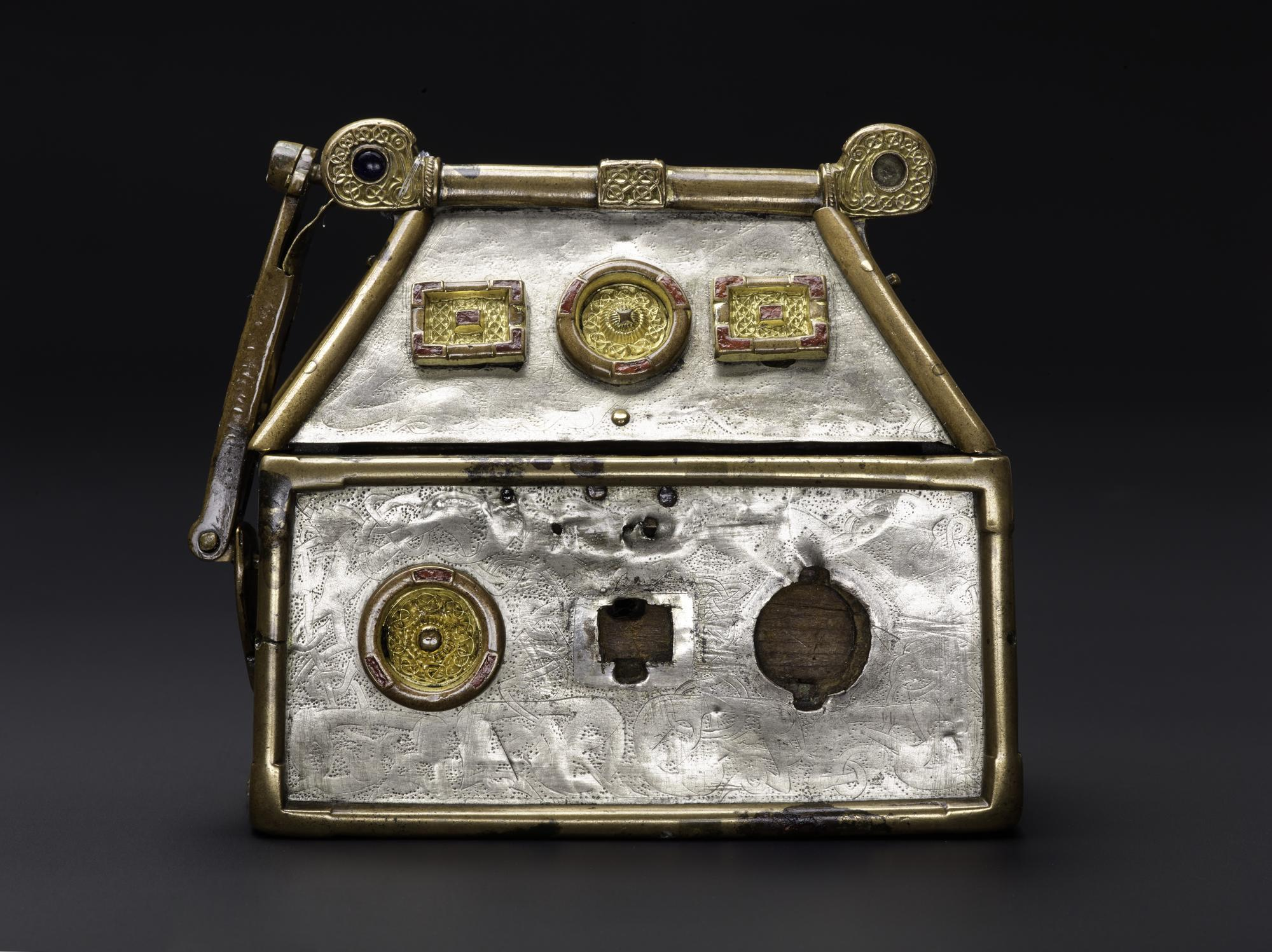
The Monymusk Reliquary, or Brecbennoch, said to house the bones of Columba

Like every other Christian country, one of the main features of Medieval Scotland was the Cult of Saints. Saints of Irish origin who were particularly revered included various figures called St Faelan and St. Colman, and saints Findbar and Finan. Columba remained a major figure into the fourteenth century and a new foundation was endowed by William I (r. 1165–1214) at Arbroath Abbey. His relics, contained in the Monymusk Reliquary, were handed over to the Abbot's care. Regional saints remained important to local identities. In Strathclyde the most important saint was St Kentigern, whose cult (under the pet name St. Mungo) became focused in Glasgow. In Lothian it was St Cuthbert, whose relics were carried across Northumbria after Lindisfarne was sacked by the Vikings before being installed in Durham Cathedral. After his martyrdom around 1115, a cult emerged in Orkney, Shetland and northern Scotland around Magnus Erlendsson, Earl of Orkney. One of the most important cults in Scotland, that of St Andrew, was established on the east coast at Kilrymont by the Pictish kings as early as the eighth century. The shrine, which from the twelfth century was said to have contained the relics of the saint brought to Scotland by Saint Regulus, began to attract pilgrims from across Scotland, but also from England and further away. By the twelfth century the site at Kilrymont had become known simply as St. Andrews and it became increasingly associated with Scottish national identity and the royal family. Its bishop would supplant that of Dunkeld as the most important in the kingdom and would begin to be referred to as Bishop of Alba. The site was renewed as a focus for devotion with the patronage of Queen Margaret, who also became important after her canonisation in 1250 and after the ceremonial transfer of her remains to Dunfermline Abbey, as one of the most revered national saints. In the late Middle Ages the "international" cults, particularity those centred on the Virgin Mary and Christ, but also St Joseph, St. Anne, the Three Kings and the Apostles, would become more significant in Scotland.

=== Organisation ===
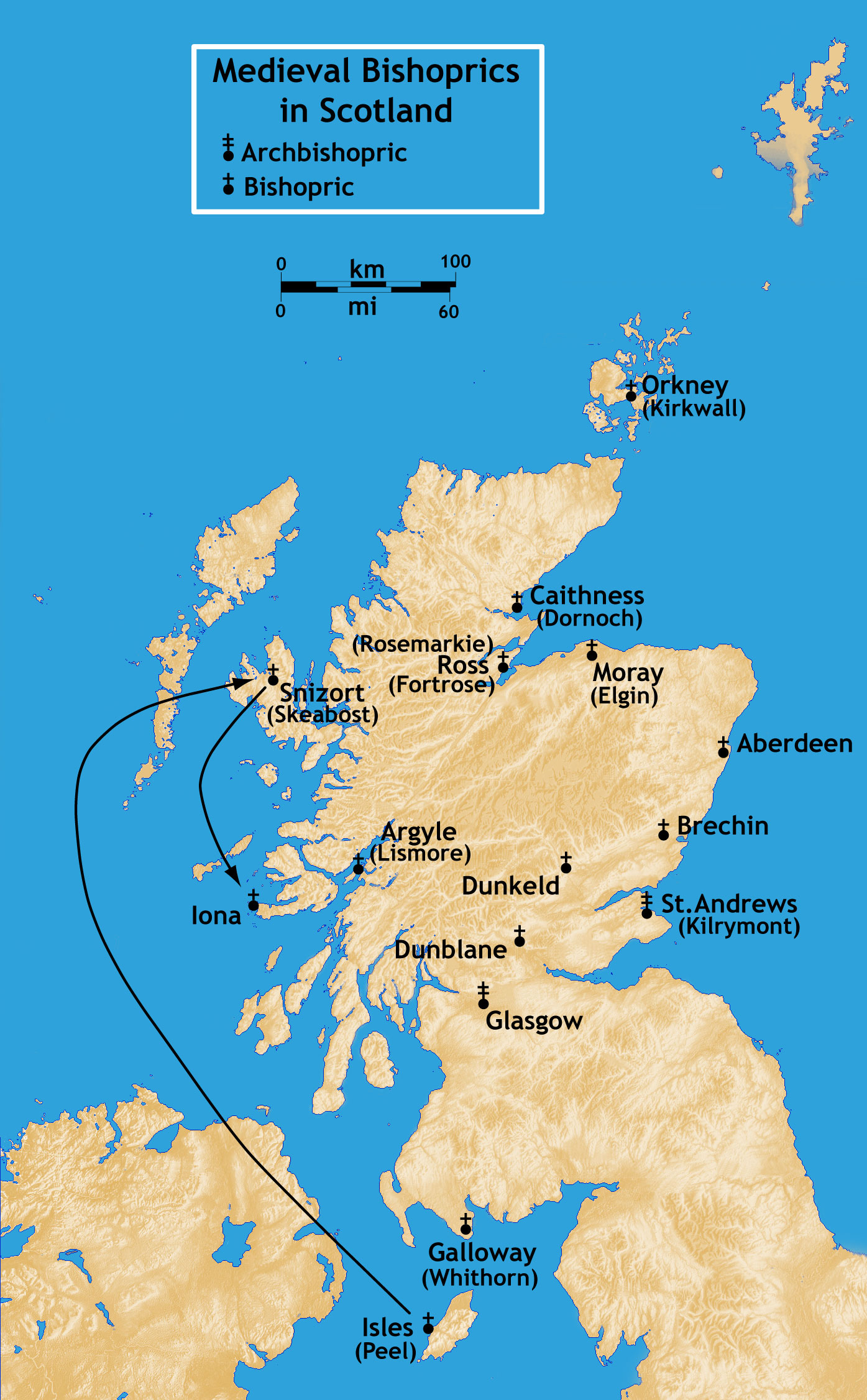
Bishoprics in Medieval Scotland

Before the twelfth century, in contrast to England, there were few parish churches in Scotland. Churches had collegiate bodies of clergy who served over a wide area, often tied together by devotion to a particular missionary saint. From this period local lay landholders, perhaps following the example of David I, began to adopt the continental practice of building churches on their property for the local population and endowing them with land and a priest. The foundation of these churches began in the south, spreading to the north-east and then the west, being almost universal by the first survey of the Scottish Church for papal taxation in 1274. The administration of these parishes was often given over to local monastic institutions in a process known as appropriation. By the time of the Reformation in the mid-sixteenth century 80 per cent of Scottish parishes were appropriated.

Before the Norman period, Scotland had little clear diocesan structure. There were bishoprics based on various ancient churches, but some are very obscure in the records and there appear to be long vacancies. From around 1070, in the reign of Malcolm III, there was a "Bishop of Alba" resident at St. Andrews, but it is not clear what authority he had over the other bishops. After the Norman Conquest of England, the Archbishops of both Canterbury and York each claimed superiority over the Scottish church. When David I secured the appointment of John, a Tironensian monk, as Bishop of Glasgow around 1113, Thurstan Archbishop of York demanded the new bishop's submission. A long running dispute followed, with John travelling to Rome to unsuccessfully appeal his case before pope Calixtus II. John continued to withhold his submission despite papal pressure to do so. A new bishopric of Carlisle was created in what is now northern England, claimed as part of the Glasgow diocese and as territory by David I. In 1126 a new bishop was appointed to the southern Diocese of Galloway based at Whithorn, who offered his submission to York, a practice which would continue until the fifteenth century. David sent John to Rome to lobby for the Bishop of St. Andrew's to be made an independent archbishop. At one point David and his bishops threatened to transfer their allegiance to the anti-pope Anacletus II. When Bishop John died in 1147 David was able to appoint another Tironensian monk, Herbert abbot of Kelso, as his successor and submission to York continued to be withheld. The church in Scotland attained independent status after the Papal Bull of Celestine III (Cum universi, 1192) by which all Scottish bishoprics except Galloway became formally independent of York and Canterbury. However, unlike Ireland which had been granted four Archbishoprics in the same century, Scotland received no Archbishop and the whole Ecclesia Scoticana, with individual Scottish bishoprics (except Whithorn/Galloway), became the "special daughter of the see of Rome". It was run by special councils made up of all the Scottish bishops, with the bishop of St Andrews emerging as the most important figure.

== Late Middle Ages ==
=== Church and politics ===
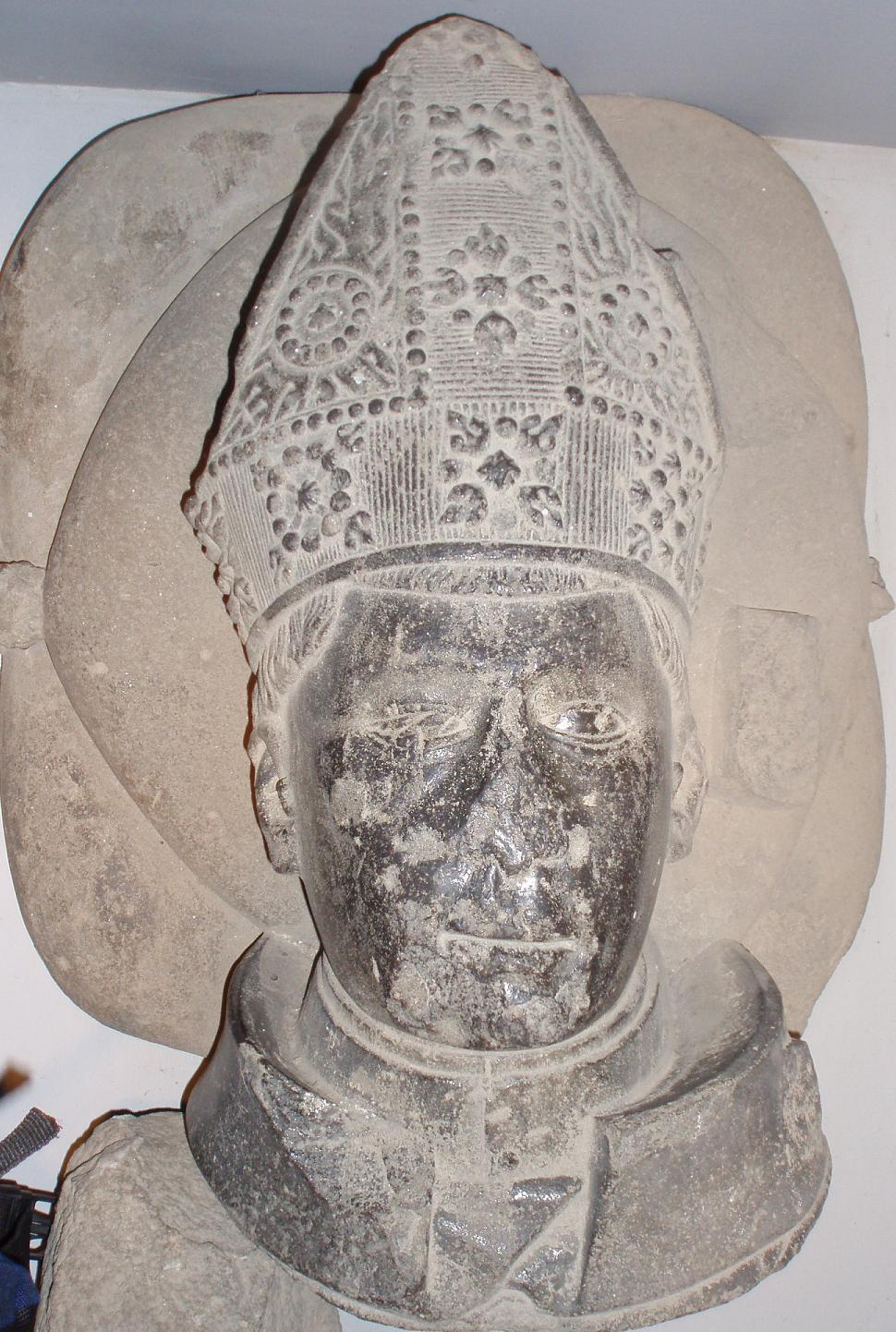
Bust of Henry Wardlaw (d. 1440), Bishop of St Andrews, tutor, royal adviser, educator and leading opponent of heresy

Late Medieval religion had its political aspects. Robert I carried the brecbennoch (or Monymusk reliquary), said to contain the remains of St. Columba, into battle at Bannockburn. In the Papal Schism (1378–1417), the Scottish church and crown sided with the Avignon Popes, beginning with Clement VII, along with France and other countries, while nations including England and the Holy Roman Empire sided with the Roman popes beginning with Urban VI. In 1383, Clement VII appointed Scotland's first cardinal, Walter Wardlaw, Bishop of Glasgow. The withdrawal of France from support of Clement's successor Benedict XIII created problems for Scottish clergy attending French universities and necessitated the creation of Scotland's first university at St. Andrews from 1411 to 1413. Scotland was one of the last churches to abandon Benedict in favour of the compromise pope, Martin V, proposed by the Council of Constance (1414–28). In the subsequent debates over Conciliarism and the authority of the pope, between those who backed the church council as the ultimate authority in the Church, and those that backed the papacy, divisions in loyalty mirrored political divisions in the country and Church. King James I and his chancellor John Cameron, Archbishop of Glasgow, became conciliarists and William Croyser, Archdeacon of Teviotdale, the leading opponent of Cameron, became a papalist. After his accession, James II backed the Pope, while the Douglases, who had dominated politics in the years after James I's death, backed the conciliar movement.

As elsewhere in Europe, the collapse of papal authority in the Papal Schism allowed the Scottish Crown to gain effective control of major ecclesiastical appointments within the kingdom. This de facto authority over appointments was formally recognised by the Papacy in 1487. This led to the placement of clients and relatives of the king in key positions, including James IV's illegitimate son Alexander, who was nominated as Archbishop of St. Andrews at the age of 11, intensifying royal influence and also opening the Church to accusations of venality and nepotism. James IV used his pilgrimages to Tain and Whithorn to help bring the respective regions of Ross and Galloway, which lay on the edges of the kingdom, under royal authority. Relationships between the Scottish Crown and the Papacy were generally good, with James IV receiving tokens of papal favour. In 1472 St Andrews became the first archbishopric in the Scottish church, to be followed by Glasgow in 1492.

=== Popular religion ===
Traditional Protestant historiography tended to stress the corruption and unpopularity of the late Medieval Scottish church, but more recent research has indicated the ways in which it met the spiritual needs of different social groups. Historians have discerned a decline of monastic life in this period, with many religious houses keeping smaller numbers of monks, and those remaining often abandoning communal living for a more individual and secular lifestyle. The rate of new monastic endowments from the nobility also declined in the fifteenth century. In contrast, the burghs saw the flourishing of mendicant orders of friars in the later fifteenth century, who, unlike the older monastic orders, placed an emphasis on preaching and ministering to the population. The order of Observant Friars were organised as a Scottish province from 1467 and the older Franciscans and the Dominicans were recognised as separate provinces in the 1480s.

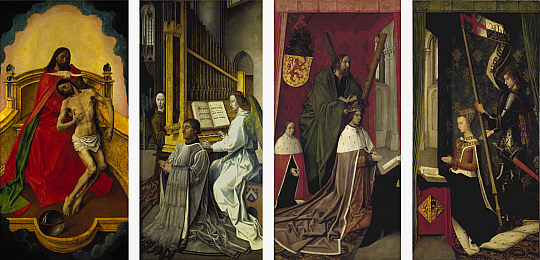
The fifteenth-century Trinity Altarpiece by Flemish artist Hugo van der Goes.

In most Scottish burghs, in contrast to English towns where churches and parishes tended to proliferate, there was usually only one parish church, but as the doctrine of Purgatory gained importance in the period, the number of chapelries, priests and masses for the dead within them, designed to speed the passage of souls to Heaven, grew rapidly. The number of altars dedicated to saints, who could intercede in this process, also grew dramatically, with St. Mary's in Dundee having perhaps 48 and St Giles' in Edinburgh over 50. The number of saints celebrated in Scotland also proliferated, with about 90 being added to the missal used in St Nicholas church in Aberdeen. New cults of devotion connected with Jesus and the Virgin Mary began to reach Scotland in the fifteenth century, including the Five Wounds, the Holy Blood and the Holy Name of Jesus. There were also new religious feasts, including celebrations of the Presentation, the Visitation and Mary of the Snows.

In the early fourteenth century the Papacy managed to minimise the problem of clerical pluralism, by which clerics held two or more livings, which elsewhere resulted in parish churches being without priests, or serviced by poorly trained and paid vicars and clerks. However, the number of poor clerical livings and a general shortage of clergy in Scotland, particularly after the Black Death, meant that in the fifteenth century the problem intensified. As a result, parish clergy were largely drawn from the lower and less educated ranks of the profession, leading to frequent complaints about their standards of education or ability. Although there is little clear evidence that standards were declining, this would be one of the major grievances of the Reformation. Heresy, in the form of Lollardry, began to reach Scotland from England and Bohemia in the early fifteenth century. Lollards were followers of John Wycliffe (c. 1330–84) and later Jan Hus (c. 1369–1415), who called for reform of the Church and rejected its doctrine on the Eucharist. Despite evidence of a number of burnings of heretics and limited popular support for its anti-sacramental elements, it probably remained a small movement. There were also further attempts to differentiate Scottish liturgical practice from that in England, with a printing press established under royal patent in 1507 to replace the English Sarum Use for services.
