= Thomas Stubbs =

Thomas Stubbs may refer to:

- Thomas Stubbs (chronicler), English Dominican chronicler
- Thomas Stubbs (cricketer, born 1856) (1856–1899), English cricketer and clergyman
- Thomas Stubbs (cricketer, born 1872) (1872–?), English cricketer
- Tommy Stubbs (born 1990), English boxer
