= Herbert of Selkirk =

Scottish bishop

- Bishop of Glasgow
- Church: Roman Catholic Church
- Diocese: Glasgow
- Appointed: 1147
- Term ended: 1164
- Predecessor: John Capellanus
- Successor: Enguerrand
- Previous post: Abbot of Selkirk (1127-1147)

Orders
- Consecration: 24 August 1147 by Eugene III

Personal details
- Died: Before 20 September 1164

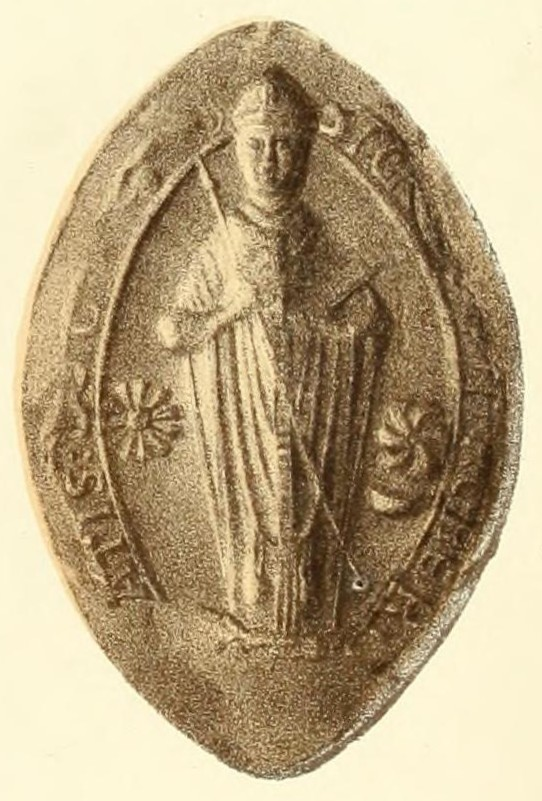
The seal of Herbert of Selkirk, abbot of Kelso.

Herbert of Selkirk (died before 20 September 1164) was a 12th-century Tironensian monk, who rose to become 3rd Abbot of Selkirk-Kelso and bishop of Glasgow. While abbot of Selkirk, King David I of Scotland moved Selkirk Abbey to nearby Kelso. He was elected to the see of Glasgow soon after the death of his Bishop John, and consecrated by Pope Eugenius III at Auxerre on St Bartholomew's Day, 24 August 1147. He died in 1164.

He wrote the first Life of Kentigern. Only the first three chapters of this extensive work remain, the text became a primary source for the biography of Kentigern written by Jocelin of Furness circa 1190.

Religious titles
Preceded by John	Bishop of Glasgow; 1147–1164	Succeeded by Enguerrand
Government offices
Preceded by John Capellanus	Chancellor of Scotland c.1126–c.1143	Succeeded by Edward of Aberdeen
