= Thomas Aird =

19th-century Scottish poet

- Born: 28 August 1802; Bowden, Roxburghshire
- Died: 28 April 1876 (aged 73)
- Occupation: Poet

Thomas Aird (28 August 1802 – 25 April 1876) was a Scottish poet, best known for his 1830 narrative poem The Captive of Fez.

== Early life and education ==
Aird was born in 1802 at Bowden, Roxburghshire. His parents were James Aird, a builder, and Isabella née Paisley. After completing his education at the local parish school, Aird studied for an undergraduate degree at the University of Edinburgh. While at University, Aird met many writers, including John Wilson and James Hogg.

== Writing career ==
After graduation, Aird resisted encouragements to become a Church of Scotland minister, instead remaining in Edinburgh to devote himself to writing. His publication debut came in 1826, with Martzoufle: a Tragedy in Three Acts, with other Poems, although this collection was largely overlooked by critics. In the early years of his career, he also contributed articles to Blackwood's Magazine, wrote a series of essays entitled Religious Characteristics, and published The Captive of Fez, a narrative poem, in 1830.

Between 1832 and 1833, Aird acted as the editor of the Edinburgh Weekly Journal, succeeding James Ballantyne. From 1835, he was the editor of the Dumfriesshire and Galloway Herald, a post he continued to hold for 28 years. While editor, several of his poems were published in the Herald.

In 1848, he published a collection of his poetry, which was very well received. His last main literary work was editing an edition of the works of David Macbeth Moir in 1852. In 1863, he retired from editorship of the Herald.

== Personal life and death ==
Aird's friends included De Quincey, Lockhart, Stanley (afterwards dean of Westminster) and Motherwell.

Aird died in 1876 in Castlebank, Dumfries, and was buried at St Michael's Church.

== See also ==
- Scottish literature
