= John Capellanus =

12th-century Scottish bishop (died 1147)

John of Glasgow
- Glasgow
- Diocese: Glasgow
- Installed: 1114 x 1118
- Term ended: 1147
- Predecessor: Michael of Glasgow
- Successor: Herbert of Selkirk

Personal details
- Born: uncertain unknown unknown
- Died: 1147
- Buried: Jedburgh Abbey
- Denomination: Roman Catholic

John (died 1147) was an early 12th-century Tironensian cleric. He was the chaplain and close confidant of King David I of Scotland, before becoming Bishop of Glasgow and founder of Glasgow Cathedral. He was one of the most significant religious reformers in the history of Scotland. His later nickname, "Achaius", a latinisation of Eochaid would indicate that he was Gaelic, but the name is probably not authentic. He was in fact a Tironensian monk, of probable French origin.

== Bishop of Glasgow ==
While David was in the custody of King Henry I of England, he spent some time in northern France. David came to cultivate strong relations with the new Tironensian monastic order, and in 1113 established a Tironensian monastery at Selkirk Abbey. John may have either been the cause of this relationship, or perhaps its product. John was serving as David's chaplain until about 1116, and was appointed bishop of Glasgow sometime thereafter. John was involved in a dispute with the Archbishop of York, a dispute general to the David's kingdom. After the accession of Thurstan to the Archbishopric of York, John received several letters from Pope Callixtus II ordering him to render homage to this archbishop as his metropolitan.

== Rome and Jerusalem ==
In 1122 Thurstan suspended John, an action which was obviously serious enough for John to travel to Rome to appeal. Afterwards John travelled on pilgrimage to Jerusalem, but in 1123 was ordered by the pope to return to his diocese. John travelled to Rome again in 1125 in order to secure a pallium, which would have elevated St Andrews to an archbishopric. Thurstan soon arrived in Rome himself, and this was probably enough to prevent Pope Honorius II granting the pallium.

On 9 December 1125 Honorius wrote a letter to John complaining that he had not yet obeyed the order to yield obedience to Thurstan, and again ordering him to do so. (Honorius wrote another letter on the same day to the Bishop-elect of Whithorn, ordering him to be consecrated by Thurstan at York). However John remained unwilling, and the year 1127 was set to continue discussion about the archbishop's rights, effectively stalling Thurstan's claims.

== Monastic life, return to see ==
Nevertheless, York's claims continued to be pressed. In 1134, there was renewed papal pressure from Pope Innocent II to make submission. Perhaps it was for this reason that John gave his allegiance to the Antipope Anacletus II. The political situation had changed by 1135, and John's move had put him out of favour. In either 1136 or 1137 John abandoned his see to become a monk at Tiron. However, in 1138, the papal legate Alberic, bishop of Ostia recalled him to his see. John died in 1147, and was buried in Jedburgh Abbey. He was succeeded by another Tironensian, Herbert, Abbot of Selkirk/Kelso.

== Legacy ==
John's legacy was vast. His impact as a confidant of David was crucial to the growth of reformed monastic orders in the Kingdom of Scotland. Moreover, John himself presided over the monastic foundations of Selkirk (later Kelso Abbey, Kelso), Jedburgh and Lesmahagow. John's episcopate saw the beginnings of Glasgow cathedral.

== Notes ==
Political offices
Preceded by ?	Chancellor of Scotland; 1124–1126	Succeeded by Herbert
Religious titles
Preceded by Michael	Bishop of Glasgow; 1109x1118–1147	Succeeded by Herbert
