= Lord of Halydean =

Nobility title in the Baronage of Scotland, Crown Barony and Lordship in Roxburghshire

Lord of Halydean or Baron of Halydean is a nobility title in the Baronage of Scotland (a lordship of higher nobility than barony).

Halydean (pronounced "Hollydeen," and also spelled "Holydean") is a Scottish Crown Barony and Lordship in Roxburghshire in the neighbourhood of Kelso, in the Borderlands of Scotland, along the River Tweed. This area along the Tweed is home to the Scottish border clans, including the Armstrongs, Douglases, Elliots, Johnstones, Kers, Moffats, and many others. The Barony and Lordship of Halydean (Holydean) is the oldest Norman feudal barony with a living claimant in the Scottish Barony Register at this time.

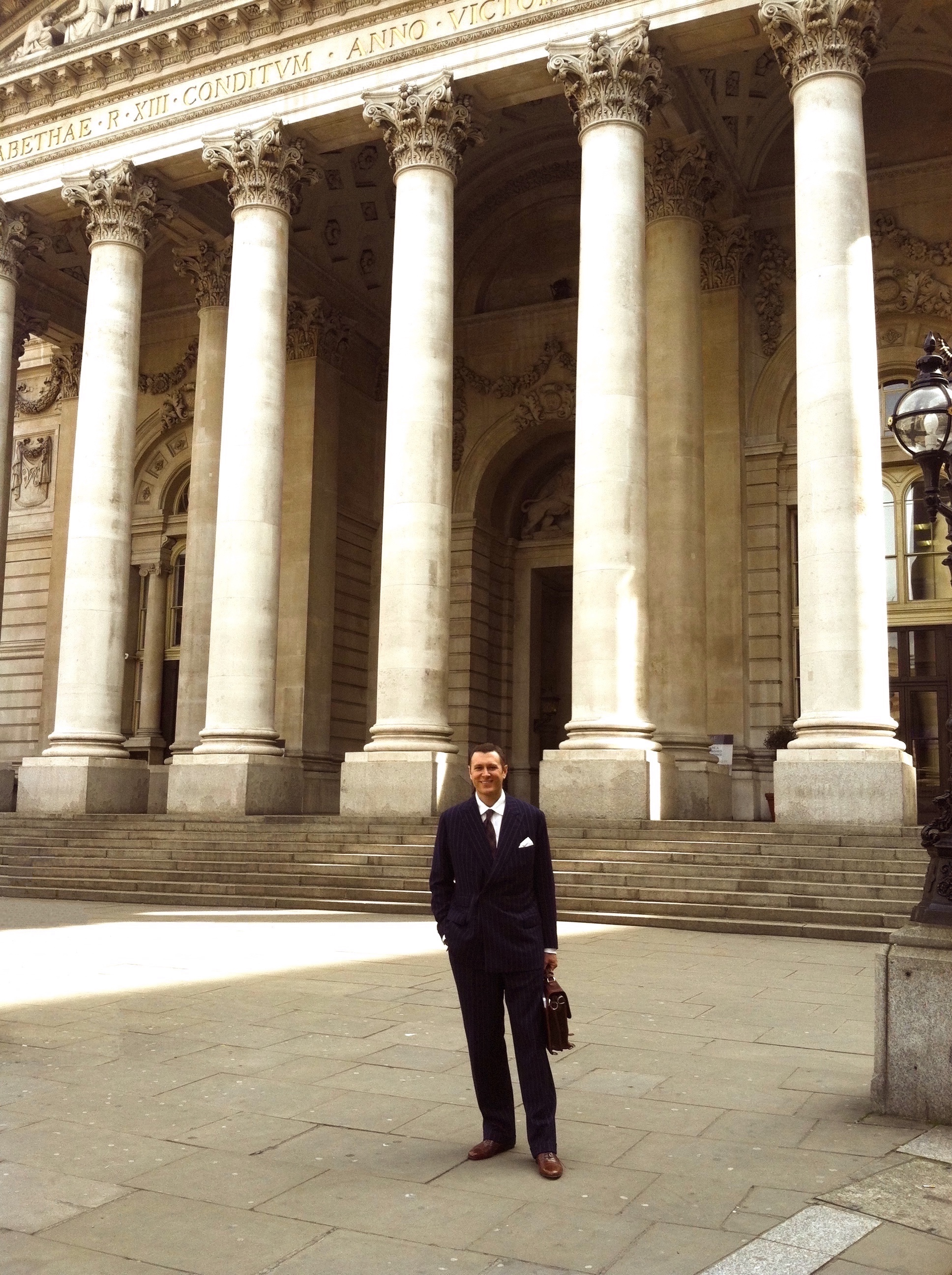
Taylor Moffitt of Halydean, Lord of Halydean, pictured here in front of the old London Stock Exchange.

The first Lord Halydean was created by King David I of Scotland when he erected the Barony and Lordship of Halydean in 1128. The Abbot of Kelso from Kelso Abbey was the local lord, who ruled one of the most powerful ecclesiastical burghs in all of Scotland. This burgh was rivaled only by St. Andrews (another burgh). David I brought the monks from Tiron in Picardy, whom he transferred from Selkirk. The monks were part of the peerage of Scotland until 1545 when the Earl of Hertford reduced the abbey to ruins. The next Lord of Halydean was made in 1602 when the Barony and Lordship of Halydean was infeft to Sir Rober Ker of Cessford, who was made 1st Earl of Roxburghe. One of his heirs became the Duke of Roxburghe, and eventually the Lordship and Barony of Halydean were disponed in the traditional Scottish manner to a member of Clan Moffat, another Scottish border clan.

Taylor Moffitt of Halydean is the present Lord Halydean, the 15th baron since secularisation in 1602. The incumbent is Ewan Moffitt of Halydean, yr, according to the customs of primogeniture.

== See also ==
- Castle Holydean
- Floors Castle
- Roxburgh Castle
