= Thomas Stubbs (chronicler) =

English Dominican chronicler of the 14th century

Thomas Stubbs (fl. 1373) was an English Dominican chronicler.

== Works ==
A number of works are attributed to him by the sixteenth-century literary biographers, but the only one that appears to be now extant is his Chronicle of the Archbishops of York. None of the manuscripts mention him as the author, but John Bale's ascription is generally accepted for the latter part of the chronicle from Paulinus to Thoresby, the whole of which he assigned to Stubbs. Roger Twysden did the same in his edition of the chronicle in the Decem Scriptores (1652), but the subsequent discovery of a twelfth-century manuscript ending with Archbishop Thurstan (Bodl. MS. Digby, 140) showed that Stubbs only continued the work from 1147. It was afterwards continued to Thomas Wolsey. A critical edition of the whole chronicle was published by James Raine in 1886 in the Rolls Series as part of the second volume of the Historians of the Church of York and its Archbishops.

Other works were attributed to Stubbs by John Leland, Bale, and John Pits.
