= Kelso Abbey =

Ruined abbey in Kelso, Scotland

Coordinates: 55°35′50″N 2°25′59″W

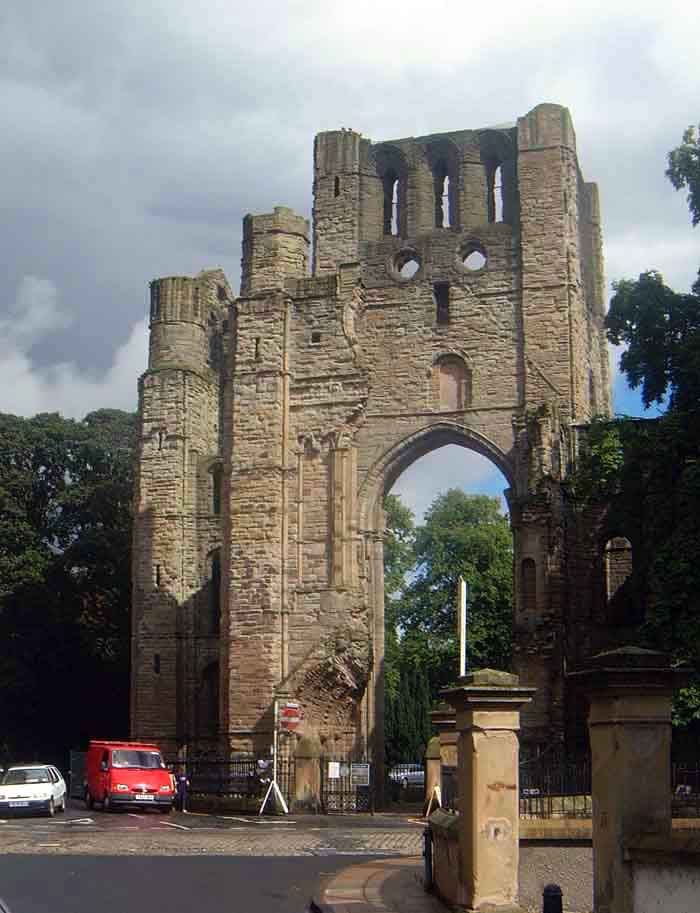
- Kelso Abbey
- Interactive map of Kelso Abbey

Monastery information
- Full name: Abbey of Our Lady and St. John
- Order: Tironensian
- Established: Community first established at Selkirk c. 1113, moved to Kelso 1128.
- Disestablished: 1559
- Mother house: Tiron Abbey
- Dedication: Our Lady and St. John
- Consecrated: 1143
- Archdiocese: St Andrews

People
- Founder: David I of Scotland
- Important associated figures: Henry of Scotland

Site
- Location: Kelso, Scottish Borders, Scotland
- Visible remains: Fragments: Western Crossing, Infirmary.
- Public access: Yes

Kelso Abbey is a ruined Scottish abbey of monks in Kelso, Scotland. It was founded in the 12th century by a community of Tironensian monks first brought to Scotland in the reign of Alexander I. It occupies ground overlooking the confluence of the Tweed and Teviot waters, the site of what was once the Royal Burgh of Roxburgh and the intended southern centre for the developing Scottish kingdom at that time. Kelso thus became the seat of a pre-eminently powerful abbacy in the heart of the Scottish Borders.

In the 14th century, Roxburgh became a focus for periodic attack and occupation by English forces and Kelso's monastic community survived a number of fluctuations in control over the area, restoring the abbey infrastructure after episodes of destruction and ultimately retaining Scottish identity. From 1460 onwards, life for the abbey probably grew more settled, but came once again under attack in the early sixteenth century. By the mid-century, through a combination of turbulent events, the abbey effectively ceased to function and the building fell into ruin.

Although the site of Kelso Abbey has not been fully excavated in modern times, evidence suggests that it was a major building with two crossings. The only remains standing today are the west tower crossing and part of the infirmary. The massive design and solid romanesque style of the tower indicate a very large building of formidable, semi-military construction and appearance, evidence of the importance with which Roxburgh was regarded when the abbacy was at the height of its power.

== Foundation ==
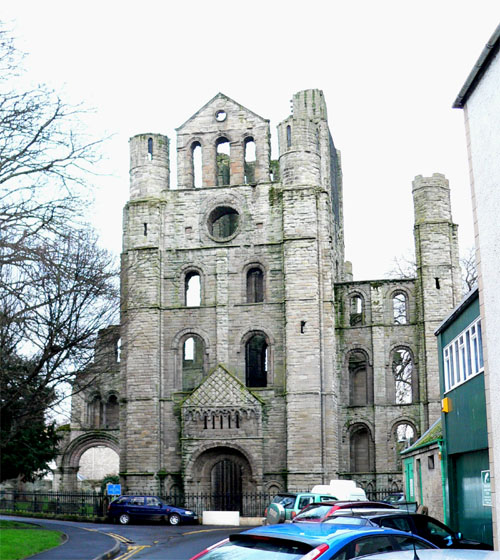
The north transept of the west crossing, showing the north doorjamb and full gable flanked with massive columnar towers.

Kelso Abbey was founded at Roxburgh in 1128 by a community of monks of the Tironesian order, from Tiron, near Chartres, in France. The community had first entered Scotland, c. 1113, under the patronage of David I as Prince of the Cumbrians during the reign of his brother, Alexander I, when the monks were given a commission to found their community at a site near Selkirk. It is not known for certain why the community came to abandon this first site in 1128, although David, now King of Scots, was developing Roxburgh as a major economic and administrative centre for Southern Scotland. Other institutions established by David at Roxburgh included the royal mint.

Construction of the abbey is believed to have commenced immediately, and by 1143 progress was sufficiently advanced for the building to be dedicated to the Blessed Virgin Mary and Saint John. The King's son, Henry, Earl of Northumbria, who predeceased his father, was interred in the abbey in 1152.

== Development and defence ==
Kelso Abbey, which was situated in sight of Roxburgh Castle across the Tweed water, soon grew to be one of the wealthiest and grandest in Scotland, with much of its income coming from its vast estates in the Border country. John, abbot of Kelso from 1160 to 1180, was the first abbot in Scotland to be granted the mitre.

After Scotland's royal dynasty began to lose the overlordship of Northumbria, during the reign of William I, David's southern "capital" came into close proximity to the border with England and was subject to attack during the Wars of Scottish Independence. In 1299, the abbot of Kelso was the English appointee, Thomas de Durham (1299–1307), but the abbey defended its Scottish identity. Throughout this turbulent period, Roxburgh Castle and Berwick upon Tweed, the major Scottish port serving the area, were frequently under English occupation. Whenever the abbey was subject to attack, the damage was repaired by the monks.

In 1460, James II was killed within sight of the abbey as the result of a fatal accident during the campaign which secured repossession of Roxburgh castle that same year. Kelso Abbey was the venue for the hasty coronation of the infant king, James III, which quickly followed. During the period from 1460 to 1513, political and military control in the area was more stable and life for the abbey was probably relatively settled. After 1517, however, it was again subject to English attacks.

== Sixteenth-century destruction ==
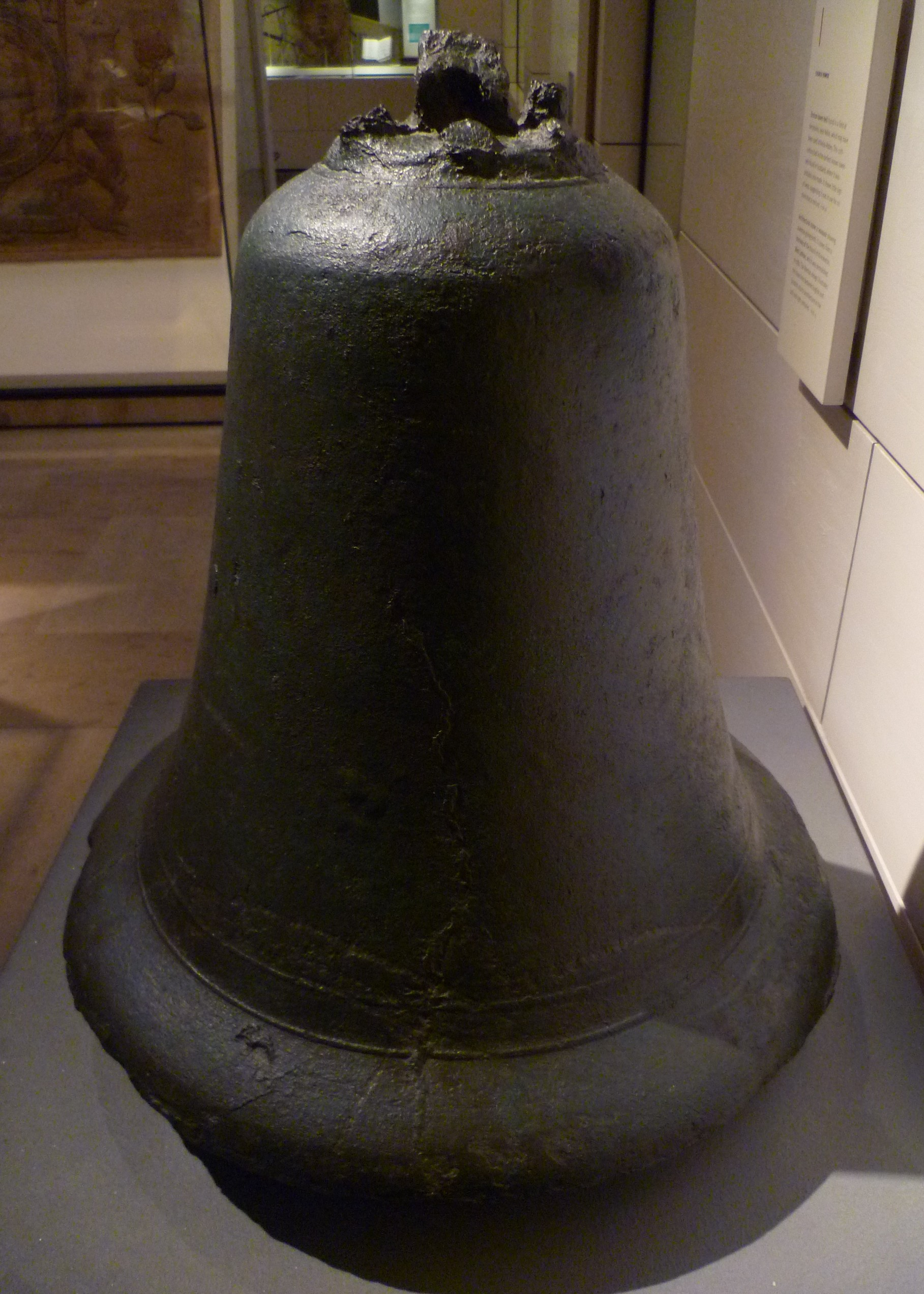
12th century bell found in a field near the Abbey

Kelso Abbey effectively ceased to function due to a combination of events in the mid-sixteenth century. First, in the 1540s, the building sustained major damage in attacks perpetrated under the orders of the English king, Henry VIII, part of the so-called Rough Wooing, in which most of southern Scotland's abbeys, including those at Melrose, Dryburgh and Jedburgh, were targeted for destruction by forces under the command of the Earl of Hertford. Plans to convert the Abbey into a bastion fort were prepared by Archangelo Arcano, an Italian military engineer working for Henry VIII.

Mary of Guise as Regent of Scotland sent building lime to Kelso from Cousland in 1554, which was stored in the monks' vaults, possibly with the intention to repair the fort rather than the abbey. The Scottish Reformation in 1560 brought monastic disestablishment, from which time the Tironensian community at Kelso was no longer officially recognised. A small remaining contingent of monks may have continued at the site for a number of years following the 1560 dissolution, but after further attacks and damage the abbey was declared officially derelict in 1587. Francis Stewart, 5th Earl of Bothwell had a house at the Abbey, and James VI visited in January 1591.

By the late 16th century the estates of the former monastery came under fully secular control and in 1607 they were finally granted as a secular lordship, titled Holydean, to the last commendator of the abbey, Robert Ker of Cesford.

== Post-reformation usage ==
Between 1647 and 1771, part of the abbey ruins was occupied by a parish kirk, with other parts of the structure being dismantled and used as a source of stone by locals for buildings in the town of Kelso. The post-reformation kirk appears to have been a compact vaulted structure intruded within the west transepts in about 1748. This adapted structure included a vaulted gaol.

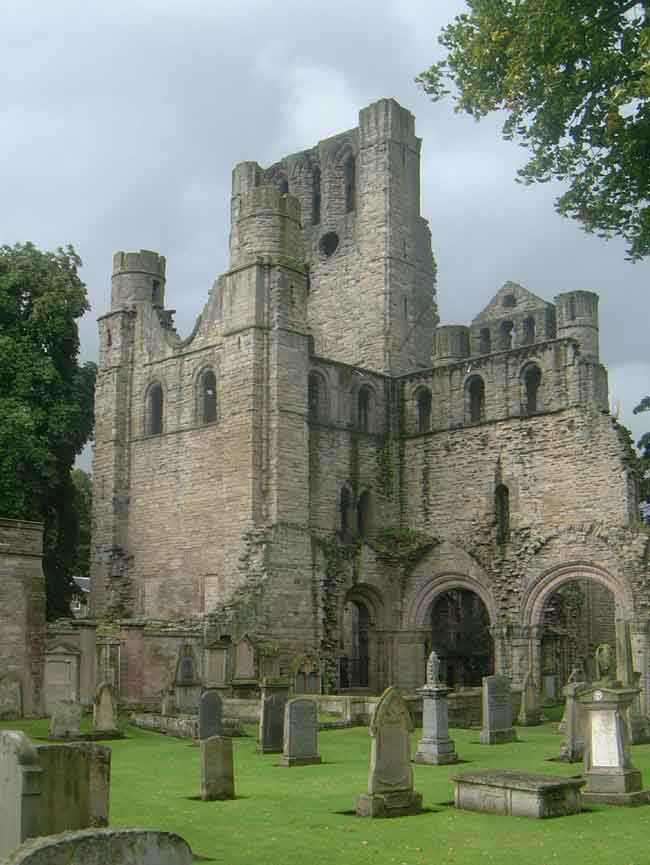
South face of the surviving West tower of Kelso Abbey (viewed from the south east).

In 1805, huge parts of the ruins were cleared away, including the parish church and the gaol, leaving only the abbey's west tower and transept remaining to this day. A more recent addition (1933) has been a memorial cloister to the 8th Duke of Roxburghe designed by Reginald Fairlie in the original style of the cloisters when the abbey was first built.

The abbey was closed to the public in 2022, due to concerns about decaying stonework. In 2026, Historic Environment Scotland made repairs, and the abbey was re-opened in July 2026.

== Architectural notes ==
Little of the ground plan of this once large abbey exists, but the surviving ruin of the west tower, together with its crossing, is impressive and shows a building that was strong and fortress like. Evidence from Vatican archives, dated 1517, indicates that the complete building had two crossings, west and east, each with single towers, a double-cruciform design that was relatively rare in Europe. The high altar of the abbey would have been at the east tower crossing. Although the east end does not survive, it may have been in a rounded form if, as would be expected, the firm Romanesque design of the extant western tower was consistent throughout the building.

The gable of the north transept of the west tower crossing (pictured right) presents the most intact surviving face. The earliest remains of the abbey are the two bays of the south arcade of the nave (partly visible at the far left of the picture). These have rounded arches dating from about 1128. Later additions above this are a triforium from the late 12th Century, and above this clerestory is a continuous arcade. There is no regular vertical pattern between three levels of arcading, a feature which is unique in Scotland or England. The masonry above the clerestory suggests that there was no nave vaulting.

The south and west faces of the west tower still rise high to the level of the belfry openings and this structure is not earlier than the beginning of the 13th Century. The west transepts and the west vestibule also survive, though only the north jamb survives of the west crossing's doorways.

In the 20th century, the "Roxburghe Aisle" was built onto the Abbey as the burial vault of the Dukes of Roxburghe.

== Burials ==
- Prince Henry of Scotland (1114–1152), Earl of Northumbria and Huntingdon
- Several of the Dukes of Roxburghe and members of their family.

== Access ==
The ruins are cared for by Historic Environment Scotland. There is no entrance charge.

== Tourism ==
This Abbey is one of five abbeys and historic sites in southern Scotland which lie on the Borders Abbeys Way walk.

== See also ==
- Kelso
- Abbot of Kelso (for a list of abbots and commendators)
- List of religious houses in Scotland
- List of places in the Scottish Borders
- List of places in Scotland
- Borders Abbeys Way
- Kilwinning Abbey
