= Teneu =

Legendary Christian saint who was venerated in medieval Glasgow, Scotland

Saint Teneu
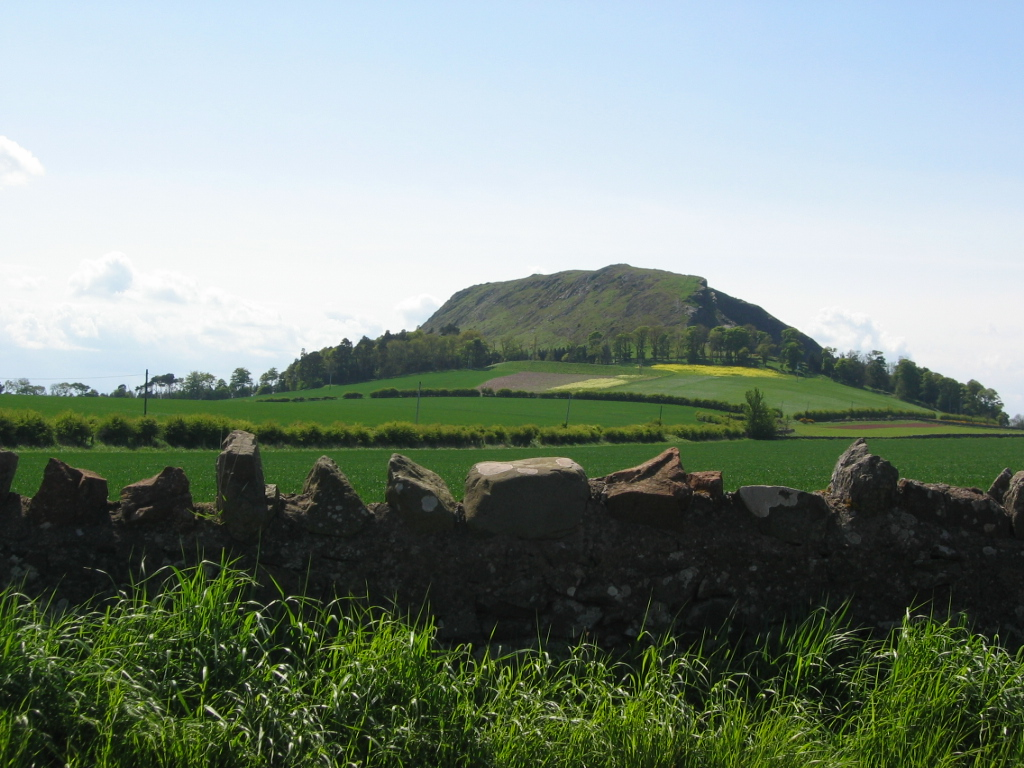
- Traprain Law: the cliff from which Teneu was thrown
- Born: Traprain Law, Lothian (alleged)
- Died: 6th or 7th century
- Venerated in: Eastern Orthodox Church; Roman Catholic Church
- Canonized: Pre-Congregation
- Feast: 18 July
- Patronage: Glasgow, Scotland

Teneu (or Thenew (Latin: Theneva), Tannoch, Thaney, Thanea, Denw, etc.) is a legendary Christian saint who was venerated in medieval Glasgow, Scotland. Traditionally she was a sixth-century Brittonic princess of the ancient kingdom of Gododdin (in what became Lothian) and the mother of Saint Mungo, apostle to the Britons of Strathclyde and founder of the city of Glas Ghu (Glasgow). She and her son are regarded as the city's co-patrons, and Glasgow's St Enoch Square allegedly marks the site of a medieval chapel dedicated to her, built on or near her grave ("St. Enoch" is in fact a corruption of "St. Teneu"). She is commemorated annually on 18 July.

== Name ==
In the first recorded hagiography of her son, her name is given as Thaney. The Vita Kentigerni ("Life of Saint Mungo"), which was commissioned by Bishop Jocelin of Glasgow and redacted later (circa 1185) by the monk Jocelyn of Furness (who claimed he rewrote it from an earlier Glasgow legend and an old Gaelic document), gives her name as Taneu; so does John Capgrave, printed 1516. Variants include Thenewe, given by the Aberdeen Breviary; Thennow of Adam King's Calendar; and the Welsh Bonedd y Saint calls her Denyw (or Dwynwen). In 1521, she appeared in John Mair's chronicle Historia Majoris Britanniae as Thametes, daughter of King Lot and sister of Gawain. Sometimes her name is given as Thameta or Thenelis.

St Enoch Square in Glasgow is named indirectly after Teneu, as a result of a version of "Saint Thenew" being conflated with the Biblical name Enoch.

Alex Woolf has suggested that the character Teneu may have been derived from Danaë, mother of the classical hero Perseus in the Fabulae of Gaius Julius Hyginius.

== Legend ==
Saint Teneu has been described as "Scotland's first recorded rape victim, battered woman and unmarried mother". Her son was conceived when the Welsh prince Owain mab Urien raped her. Owain was disguised as a woman, and after sexually assaulting the naïve princess, he confused her by saying: "Weep not, my sister, for I have not known thee as a man is used to know a virgin. Am I not a woman like thyself?" Upon discovering her pregnancy, her angry father King Lleuddun sentenced her to death and she was hurled from Traprain Law. Miraculously she survived the fall; when discovered alive at the foot of the cliff, Teneu was set adrift in a coracle and travelled across the Firth of Forth to Culross, where she was given shelter at the community of Saint Serf. There she gave birth to and raised her son Kentigern, whom Serf nicknamed Mungo, "very dear one".

There are also Welsh legends about Teneu:

The cult which grew around St Thenew in Glasgow also developed in Wales where it was held that she had other sons by her marriage to the northern Prince Dingad, son of Nudd. The earliest surviving reference to her is in fact in the Life of St Winifred (c. 1140), in which Winifred, went to St Eleri for instruction. St Eleri put Winifred in the care of his mother "Theonia" whom Winifred eventually succeeded as abbess of Gwytherin (Clwyd). Kentigern was also a cult figure in Clwyd.

== Modern adaptations ==
She is the subject of Kathleen Herbert's historical novel, Bride of the Spear, part of her Dark Ages of Britain trilogy, as Taniu, (1982, St Martin's Press), and of Nigel Tranter's historical novel Druid Sacrifice (1993, Hodder & Stoughton), as Thanea.

In 2025 a new site-specific poetry play entitled Maiden Mother Mage was performed by actors at Culross Abbey and Glasgow Cathedral, written and directed by Rebecca Sharp. The work shows imagined versions of Thaney at three stages of life, speaking in the first person - as Maiden / Thaney, Mother / Teneu, Mage / Enoch. The book of Maiden Mother Mage is published by Matecznik Press.

== See also ==
- Wish tree
