= Waltheof of Melrose =

12th-century Anglo-Norman abbot and saint

Waltheof
- Abbot of Melrose
- Installed: 1148
- Term ended: 1159
- Predecessor: Richard
- Successor: William

Personal details
- Born: c. 1095 probably Huntingdon or Northamptonshire
- Died: 3 August 1159 (aged c. 64) Melrose
- Buried: Melrose Abbey
- Parents: Simon I of St Liz, 1st Earl of Northampton; Maud, 2nd Countess of Huntingdon

Sainthood
- Feast day: 3 August
- Patronage: Melrose Abbey, Northamptonshire

Waltheof (Note: Also Waldef or Waldeve) (c. 1095–1159) was a 12th-century English abbot and saint. He was the son of Simon I of St Liz, 1st Earl of Northampton and Maud, 2nd Countess of Huntingdon, thus stepson to David I of Scotland, and the grandson of Waltheof, Earl of Northampton.

Whether as a result of being a younger son in the world of Norman succession laws, or being personally unsuited to court life, Waltheof chose a career in the church. Between 1128 and 1131 he entered Nostell Priory to become an Augustinian canon. His noble connections enabled him to rise quickly, and by 1139 he was Prior of Kirkham, North Yorkshire. Upon the death of Thurstan, Archbishop of York, in 1140, Waltheof was nominated to be his successor. His candidacy was supported by William of Aumale, the Earl of York. Stephen, King of England, probably sensing his links to David and hence to the Empress Matilda were too strong, rejected the nomination. William of Aumale withdrew his support after Waltheof refused to promise to give the earl the ecclesiastical manor of Sherburn-in-Elmet in the West Riding of Yorkshire. William fitz Herbert was instead chosen by Stephen. Waltheof featured prominently among those opposing William's provision, but by 1143 he had given up and become a Cistercian monk, first at Wardon Abbey and then at Rievaulx Abbey. In 1148 he was elected to the abbacy of Melrose, a daughter house of Rievaulx. Waltheof remained in this position for the remainder of his life, even though he was offered the bishopric of St Andrews in early 1159, which he declined. He died at Melrose Abbey on 3 August 1159.

Following the death of Waltheof, his successor as Abbot of Melrose, Abbot William, refused to encourage the rumours that were spreading regarding Waltheof's saintliness. Abbot William attempted to silence these rumours, and prevent the intrusiveness of would-be pilgrims. However, William was unable to get the better of Waltheof's emerging cult, and his actions alienated him from his brethren. As a result, in April 1170, William resigned the abbacy. In William's place, Jocelin, the prior of Melrose, became abbot. Jocelin had no such scruples and embraced the cult without hesitation. In the entry for the year of Jocelin's accession, the Chronicle of Melrose reads:

The tomb of our pious father, sir Waltheof, the second abbot of Melrose, was opened by Enguerrand, of good memory, the bishop of Glasgow, and by four abbots called in for this purpose; and his body was found entire, and his vestments intact, in the twelfth year from his death, on the eleventh day before the Kalends of June [22 May]. And after the holy celebration of mass, the same bishop, and the abbots whose number we have mentioned above, placed over the remains of his most holy body a new stone of polished marble. And there was great gladness; those who were present exclaiming together, and saying that truly this was a man of God.

Later, as bishop of Glasgow, Jocelin continued the promotion of sainthood and commissioned a hagiography of Saint Kentigern, the saint most venerated by the Celts of the diocese of Glasgow. It is no coincidence that Jocelin of Furness, who wrote the Life of St. Waltheof, was the same man later commissioned to write the Life of St. Kentigern. Jocelin's actions ensured Waltheof's posthumous de facto sainthood; and the need of Melrose Abbey to have its own saint's cult ensured the cult's longevity.
