= Mauchline Castle =

Castle in East Ayrshire, Scotland

Coordinates: 55.51591°N 4.38073°W

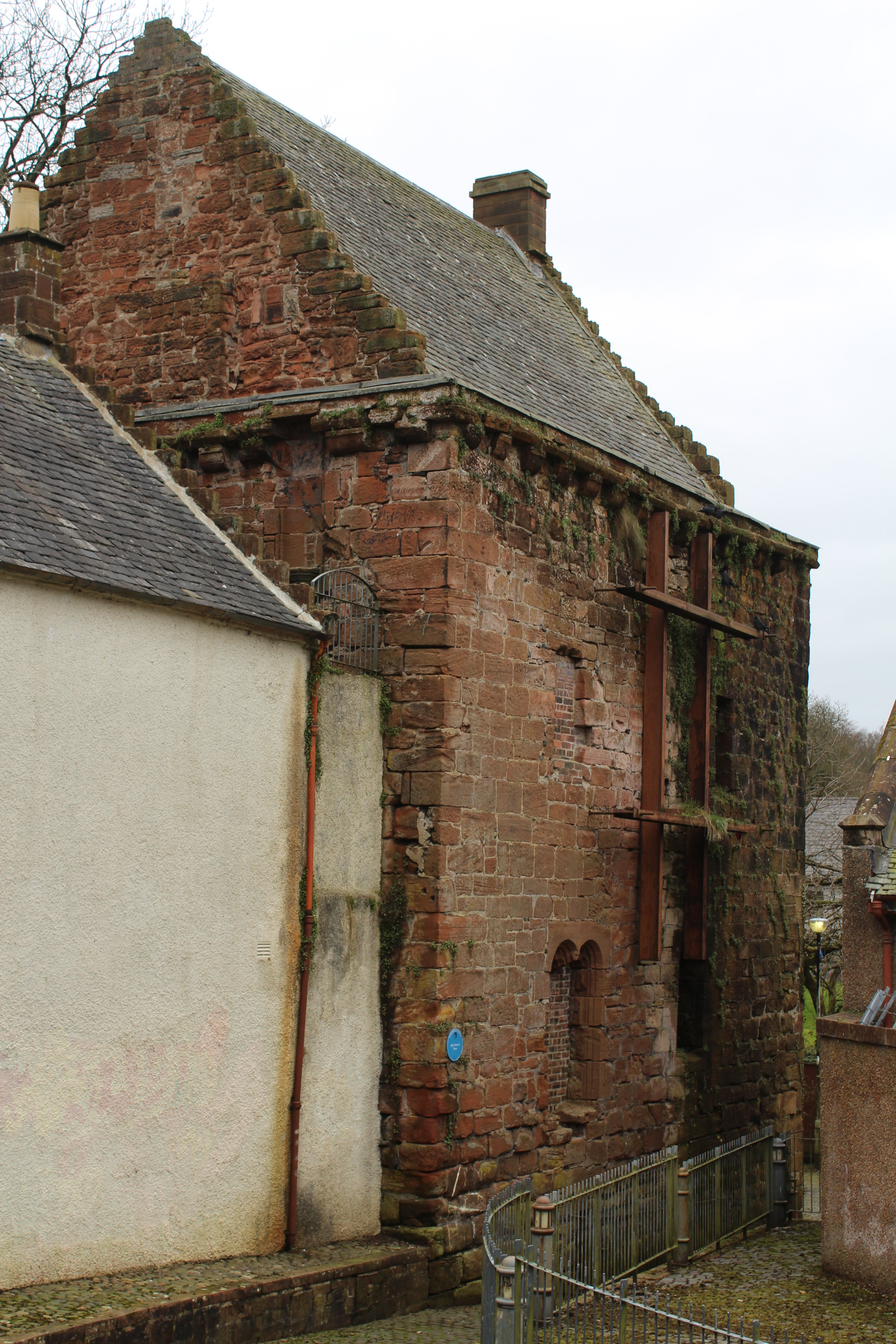
Mauchline Castle

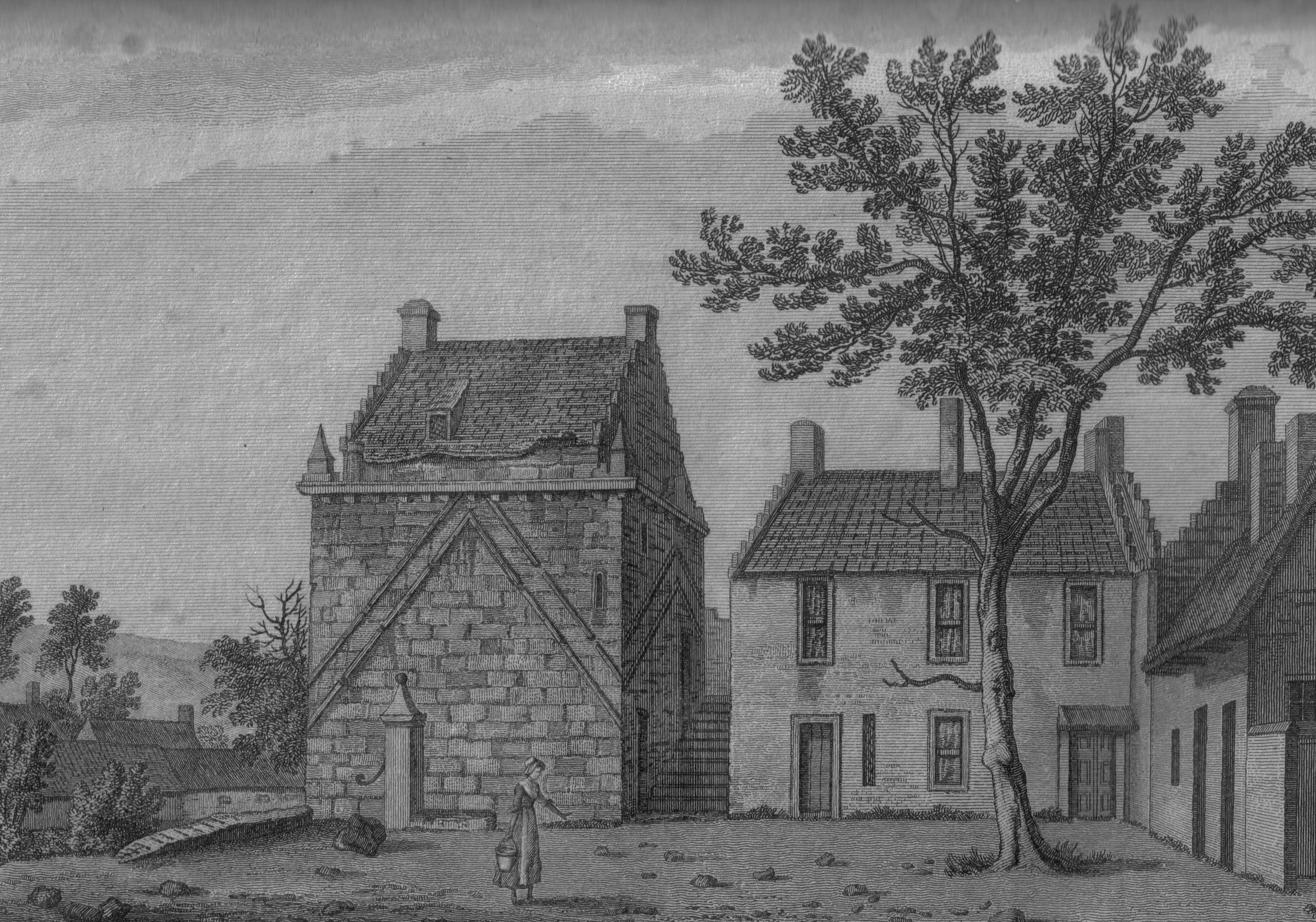
Mauchline Castle, engraved by Francis Grose in 1790

Mauchline Castle, also known as Abbot Hunter's Tower, is a rectangular tower house dating from the fifteenth century, in Mauchline, East Ayrshire, Scotland. The tower once formed part of a group of monastic buildings associated with Melrose Abbey, and today is a category A listed building.

== History ==
Before 1177 the monks of Melrose Abbey held lands in Ayrshire, approximately represented by the extent of Mauchline parish. The castle was constructed in about 1450 as part of a grange, a farming estate belonging to a monastery. The arms of Abbot Andrew Hunter (c.1444-71) on a boss in the vaulting of the first-floor hall give the earliest dating of the Castle. Huw Campbell of Loudoun was appointed Bailie of Barony in 1521, gaining the temporal lordship in 1606. The square-headed windows may have been inserted at this time. During the following two centuries, houses were built next to the castle, and in the 18th century Gavin Hamilton, lawyer and friend of Robert Burns, lived here as a tenant of Lord Loudoun Burns is said to have written the parody sermon The Calf, and to have married Jean Armour, in the castle. Although repaired in the 19th century, it was described as being "in a state of decay" in 1980.

== Coal and the Commendator ==
James V of Scotland granted Melrose Abbey and its lands to his son, James Stewart, Commendator of Kelso and Melrose (died 1557). William Hamilton of Sanquhar assisted in managing the estate and had coal mines on Melrose lands near Mauchline, and when James Stewart stayed at Mauchline Castle (a Melrose property) the coal was reserved to him.

== Structure ==
The tower is built of red ashlar, and measures 10 by 9 metres (33 by 30 ft), with the walls being 5 feet (1.5 m) thick. The entrance is to the south, at ground level, with a statue niche above and a turnpike stair to its left. There are four main storeys, and an attic with crowstep gables. The hall, on the first floor, is rib-vaulted in two bays, and has stone seats in the windows. It is over a vaulted basement comprising two poorly lit chambers. There is an unusual double garderobe chute at the north gable.
