= Gillemachoi =

Scottish serf

Gillemachoi was a serf quitclaimed by King William the Lion to Jocelin, Bishop of Glasgow. His name means "lad or servant of Saint Mungo". In a charter issued at Selkirk at some point between 1175 and 1190, King William acknowledges the full ownership of "Gillemachoi de Conglud" and all his relatives and dependents to the "church of St Kentigern of Glasgow". It is not clear why Jocelin sought confirmation of ownership, since the bishopric had possessed the land of "Conglud", that is, Kinclaith (modern Glasgow Green) since the reign of King Malcolm IV.
