= Robert de Keldeleth =

- Born: Probably, 1200s
- Died: 1273; Melrose, Scotland
- Other names: Robert Kenleith
- Occupation: Abbot
- Title: Abbot of Dunfermline; Chancellor of Scotland; Abbot of Melrose

Robert de Keldeleth (or Robert Kenleith) (died 1273) was a 13th-century Benedictine and then Cistercian abbot. He started his senior career as Abbot of Dunfermline (1240–52), becoming Chancellor of Scotland later in the 1240s. He took a prominent role as a supporter of Alan Durward during the minority of Alexander III of Scotland, and appears to have lost the Chancellorship as result. Following his resignation of the abbacy of Dunfermline, he became a Cistercian monk at Newbattle Abbey while continuing a comparatively less active role on the wider stage. In 1269 he became Abbot of Melrose (1269–1273), Newbattle's mother house, and held this position for the last four years of his life.

== Dunfermline ==
His name suggests he came from or was associated with Kinleith, in Currie parish, Midlothian. Robert began his career as a Benedictine monk at Dunfermline Abbey, Fife, Scotland. After the death of Abbot Geoffrey III on 5 October 1240, he was chosen as the new Abbot of Dunfermline. He became one of Dunfermline's most successful abbots and enjoyed a close relationship with King Alexander II of Scotland. After a request was made by the king, on 3 May 1245, Pope Innocent IV wrote to Abbot Robert granting permission for the latter to use a mitre and a ring, a privilege which increased the abbey's status. Robert further elevated the abbey's status by successfully spearheading a campaign to canonise Saint Margaret of Scotland, a figure who had been claimed to be Dunfermline's founder and whose shrine lay in the town; the translation of her remains took place in June 1250. Such successes were undoubtedly helped by Robert's good relationship with the Pope. Robert was officially a Papal chaplain, and, for instance, the Pope had charged Robert to assist in a dispute with the Bishop of St Andrews regarding a benefice that he wished to bestow on a Florentine follower.

== National politics ==
Robert's career rise continued when, at an unknown point between 1247 and 1251, he became Chancellor of Scotland. He was on the Council of Guardians formed to govern Scotland after the death of Alexander II on 6 July 1249. The governing Council broke down around two rival factions, one centred on Walter Comyn and the other around Alan Durward; Robert became a firm member of the Durward faction. The Comyn's later accused Robert of using his seal (the Great Seal of the Chancellor) and influence in an attempt to legitimise Durward's wife, a bastard daughter of Alexander II, an act which would have made Durward heir to the throne. However, Robert's position became difficult when in 1251 the Walter Comyn gained control of the government. In 1252 Robert lost the position of Chancellor.

== Robert the Cistercian ==
In the same year Robert resigned his position as Abbot of Dunfermline and retired to be a Cistercian monk at Newbattle Abbey. Nevertheless, Robert did not cease to be active on the wider stage, and his relationship with Pope Innocent continued even as a humble monk of Newbattle. In August and September 1260, Robert was used as a messenger between King Alexander III of Scotland and King Henry III of England. Moreover, by the end of the 1260s he rose again to the position of Abbot. After the resignation of John de Ederham, Robert was chosen to become Abbot of Melrose. Melrose Abbey was the mother-house of Newbattle and the position of Abbot of Melrose was the senior Cistercian post in Scotland. Robert held the position for four years. He resigned and died in the year 1273. He was probably buried in Melrose Abbey.

== Notes ==
Religious titles
Preceded by Geoffrey III	Abbot of Dunfermline; 1240–1252	Succeeded by John
Preceded by John de Ederham	Abbot of Melrose; 1269–1273	Succeeded by Patrick de Selkirk
Political offices
Preceded by William de Bondington	Chancellor of Scotland; 1247 × 51 –1252	Succeeded by Gamelin
