= Dundee Fortnight =

Scottish holiday in July

- Observed by: Dundonians
- Type: Commercial
- Begins: Last week of July
- Ends: First week of August
- Date: July - August
- Duration: 2 weeks
- Frequency: Annually

The Dundee Fortnight is a holiday during the last week in July and first week in August in the city of Dundee, Scotland. The holiday is similar to the Glasgow Fair in that, until as recently as the 1960s, most local businesses and factories would close for these two weeks and workers and their families would crowd bus and railway stations and Fifies to go for holidays in destinations such as Fife, Angus and Broughty Ferry. The holiday was of special significance to the working class of the city, especially as all the jute and textiles factories were closed during this time.

Nowadays, fewer local businesses close down for the Fortnight, although it is still common for people to go on holiday at this time, and the city can be noticeably quieter, although another factor in this could be that the city's large number of students do not attend University over the summer. Some services are reduced during the Fortnight. For instance, some buses were running on a Sunday schedule and libraries were closed during the first day in 2009 (Monday 27 July).
