= Enguerrand (bishop of Glasgow) =

- Bishop of Glasgow
- Church: Roman Catholic Church
- Diocese: Glasgow
- Appointed: 20 September 1164
- Term ended: 2 February 1174
- Predecessor: Herbert of Selkirk
- Successor: Jocelin of Glasgow
- Previous post(s): Archdeacon of Teviotdale

Orders
- Consecration: 28 October 1164 by Alexander III

Personal details
- Died: 2 February 1174

Enguerrand (also Ingram, died 1174) was a twelfth-century bishop of Glasgow. He had previously been Archdeacon of Teviotdale, and had served king Máel Coluim IV as Chancellor of Scotland between 1161 and 1164. He was elected Bishop of Glasgow on Sunday, 20 September 1164, and consecrated on 28 October at the hands of Pope Alexander III himself in Sens, France, where the Pope was then resident. He did not return to the diocese until 2 June 1165. Although he resigned the position of Royal Chancellor upon election to the bishopric, there is charter evidence that he once again became Chancellor in the reign of King William the Lion, probably in the year 1171. Notable actions of his episcopate included, probably on the request of his friend (and successor) Jocelin, then Abbot of Melrose, the opening of the tomb of the emerging saint Walthoef. He died on 2 February 1174.

== Notes ==
Political offices
Preceded by Walter possibly Walter FitzAlan	Chancellor of Scotland; 1161–64 again 1171?	Succeeded by Nicholas
Religious titles
Preceded by Herbert	Bishop of Glasgow; 1164–74	Succeeded by Jocelin
