= William de Malveisin =

Roman Catholic bishop

- Bishop of St Andrews
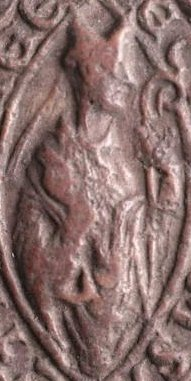
- Church: Roman Catholic Church
- Diocese: St Andrews
- In office: 1202–1238
- Predecessor: Roger de Beaumont
- Successor: David de Bernham
- Previous post: Bishop of Glasgow

Orders
- Consecration: 24 September 1200 by Renaud de Forez

Personal details
- Born: France
- Died: 9 July 1238 Inis Muiredaich

Guillaume or William Malveisin (also, modern forms Malvoisin or Mauvoisin) was Chancellor of Scotland, Bishop of Glasgow (1199/1200–1202) and then Bishop of St. Andrews (1202–1238).

William Malveisin was probably born in France. It is possible that he was the son of the nephew of the Count of Brittany, however it is much more likely that he came from a family of the name based on the lower Seine valley. William was likely the nephew of Samson Malveisin, Archbishop of Rheims from 1140 to 1161. In this context, William's career can come as no surprise.

William appears in Scottish records for the first time in the 1180s, appearing as a royal clerk. In 1193, the royal patronage he had earned brought him his first known ecclesiastical post, as Archdeacon of Lothian. He was made the king's Chancellor probably on 8 September 1199, and was elected to the Bishopric of Glasgow in October the same year. He was consecrated at Lyon by Renaud de Forez, Archbishop of Lyon, in September 1200. However, two years later in the same month, he was translated to the higher ranking Bishopric of St. Andrews. William got into a little trouble for exercising his episcopal powers before his episcopate had been confirmed by the Pope, then Innocent III; a charge was brought against him by one of his canons, a man named Eustace. The charge was heard by the Papal legate, John of Salerno, who held a council at Perth in December 1201, before leaving for business in Ireland. Legate John once again visited Scotland on his way back from Ireland, staying for more than fifty days at Melrose. However, nothing came of the charge.

Walter Bower relates that William received the permission of King William to visit his relatives in France. This was perhaps between May 1212 and Spring 1213, when Bishop William disappears from the records. When not visiting home, Bishop William, like most other Bishops of St. Andrews, was keen to expand the power of the bishopric. In one instance, when Gille Ísu, the hereditary priest of Wedale (Peeblesshire) died, he took the opportunity to absorb the church into his diocese. Bishop William enjoyed good relations with the native Scottish clerical order of his diocese, the people "qui Keledei vulgariter appellantur" (commonly called Céli Dé, Gaelic for "Vassals of God"). At some point between 1206 and 1216, and again in 1220, he managed to obtain absolution from the sentence of excommunication bestowed on the Céli Dé by the Pope; it may be that Bishop William's patronage ensured the opening priesthoods of its church, the Church of St Mary on the Rock at St. Andrews, to non-native clergy, to men such as Henry de Weles, and encouraged the order to consolidate its position vis-à-vis the papacy.

According to the arguments of D.D.R. Owen, William was not only a bishop, but an author of Arthurian romance. The author of the romance known to us as the Roman de Fergus identifies himself as Guillaume le Clerc, or William the Clerk. In the words of Owen, "it is most reasonable to keep our eyes open for any French clerk by the name of William (Guillaume)" in the period concerned, and Owen uses textual and contextual evidence to show that William Malveisin is one of the most likely known candidates.

Bishop William died at "Inchemordauch" (Inis Muiredaich), an episcopal manor located near Lower Kenley, Fife, in 1238, probably on 9 July. The next consecrated Bishop of St. Andrews was David de Bernham.

== Notes ==
Political offices
Preceded by Hugh de Roxburgh	Chancellor of Scotland; 1199–1202	Succeeded by Florence of Holland
Religious titles
Preceded by Hugh de Roxburgh (unconsecrated); Jocelin	Bishop of Glasgow; 1199–1202	Succeeded by Florence of Holland (elect only); Walter the Chaplain
Preceded by Roger de Beaumont	Bishop of St Andrews; 1202–1238	Succeeded by David de Bernham
