= James Stewart, Commendator of Kelso and Melrose =

Illegitimate son of James V of Scotland

James Stewart, Commendator of Kelso and Melrose (c. 1529–1557) was an illegitimate son of King James V of Scotland.

== Career ==
James Stewart was a son of James V and of Elizabeth Schaw, a member of the Schaw of Sauchie family. His exact birthdate is unknown. A document dated 1534 states he was in his fifth year.

Elizabeth Schaw is sometimes identified as a woman of the same name who married a minor courtier of James V, Robert Gibb.

James V had children with a number of mistresses before his marriages to Madeleine of France and Mary of Guise. A more well-known half-brother, James Stewart, 1st Earl of Moray, was variously known as "Lord James", the Prior of St Andrews, the Earl of Mar, the Earl of Moray, and Regent Moray.

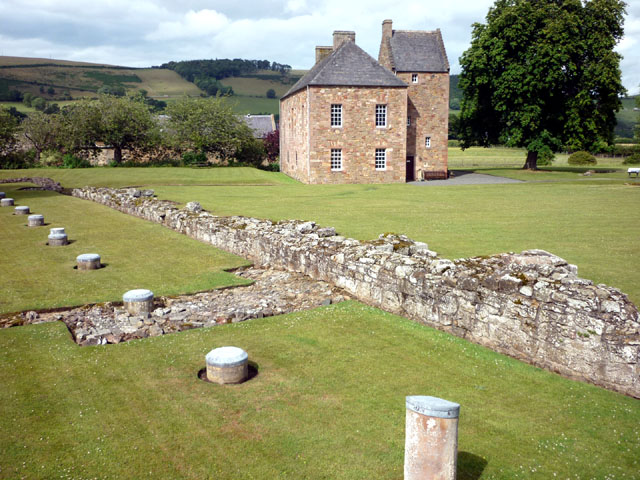
The Commendator's House at Melrose Abbey

In April 1532 the king's wardrobe servant and pursemaster Harry Kemp spent £20 Scots on the expenses of keeping the infant and his nurse's wages. In 1536, George Buchanan became his tutor. Clothes for "lord James of Kelso" and his brothers were made by the king's tailor, Thomas Arthur. James Stewart resided at St Andrews and was there in March 1539.

Like other members of the Scottish royal family, James Stewart was granted an income from monastic lands, as Commendator of Kelso and Melrose. James V wrote to the Pope Clement VII to obtain dispensations so his sons could hold clerical offices. In 1541 James V wrote to Cardinal Ghinucci in Rome to obtain permission to restructure the landholding system of the estates of Kelso and Melrose. He intended to realise a financial advantage (in the name of his son) by setting tenancies in "feufarm" with long lease "teinds" or tithes. In order to do this, permission was required from Rome for the actions of administrators on the behalf of the nine-year old James Stewart.

Lord James and his brother Lord James of St Andrews were at school in St Andrews after the death of James V. In June 1543, Regent Arran sent the Laird of Grange to collect them and take them to Linlithgow Palace. Robert Douglas took his stepson Lord James of St Andrews to Lochleven Castle instead, defying the Regent. James Stewart was at Stirling Castle with his sister Mary, Queen of Scots on 28 July 1544, and signed and sealed a charter.

He wrote a letter to his step-mother Mary of Guise from Melrose, apparently in 1545, discussing the business of feuing and teinds on her jointure lands of Selkirk and Ettrick. He had recently been with her at Linlithgow Palace. As instructed, he told Tom Scot of Haining to take his teind crops to their barn yard in Selkirk. William Hamilton of Sanquhar assisted in the administration of Melrose Abbey. Sanquhar had coal mines on Melrose lands, and if James Stewart visited Mauchline Castle (a Melrose property) the coal was reserved to him.

In August 1548 his half brothers John Stewart, Commendator of Coldingham and Lord Robert sailed for France from Dumbarton with Mary, Queen of Scots. According to an English observer, Henry Johnes, the older brothers, Lord James, Prior of St Andrews and James Stewart, Commendator of Kelso and Melrose refused to go with her.

In 1550, after the conclusion of the war known the Rough Wooing, he accompanied Mary of Guise on a visit to French court and his half-sister Mary, Queen of Scots. His half-brother John Stewart, Commendator of Coldingham also came. A number of Scottish nobles and lairds were included on the trip, perhaps a move intended to build support for pro-French policy.

In July 1553, his sister Lady Jean Stewart was contracted to marry Archibald Campbell, 5th Earl of Argyll. Her cash dowry of 5,000 merks was to be paid by Mary of Guise and her brothers, the Commendators of Kelso, Holyrood, and Coldingham.

He died in 1557.

In March 2021 one of his seal matrices as Commendator of Kelso and of Melrose, showing his coat-of-arms (the Royal Arms of Scotland with a "bar sinister" of illegitimacy), was acquired by the National Museum of Scotland.

== Ancestors ==
Ancestors of James Stewart, Commendator of Kelso and Melrose

8. James III of Scotland
4. James IV of Scotland
9. Margaret of Denmark
2. James V of Scotland
10. Henry VII of England
5. Margaret Tudor
11. Elizabeth of York
1. James Stewart
12. John Shaw
6. Sir James Shaw
13. Jonet Forrester
3. Elizabeth Shaw
14. Sir Patrick Hume
7. Alison Hume
15. Margaret Sinclair
