= Oduvald =

Scottish nobleman, monk, saint and abbot

Saint Oduvald Abbot of Melrose
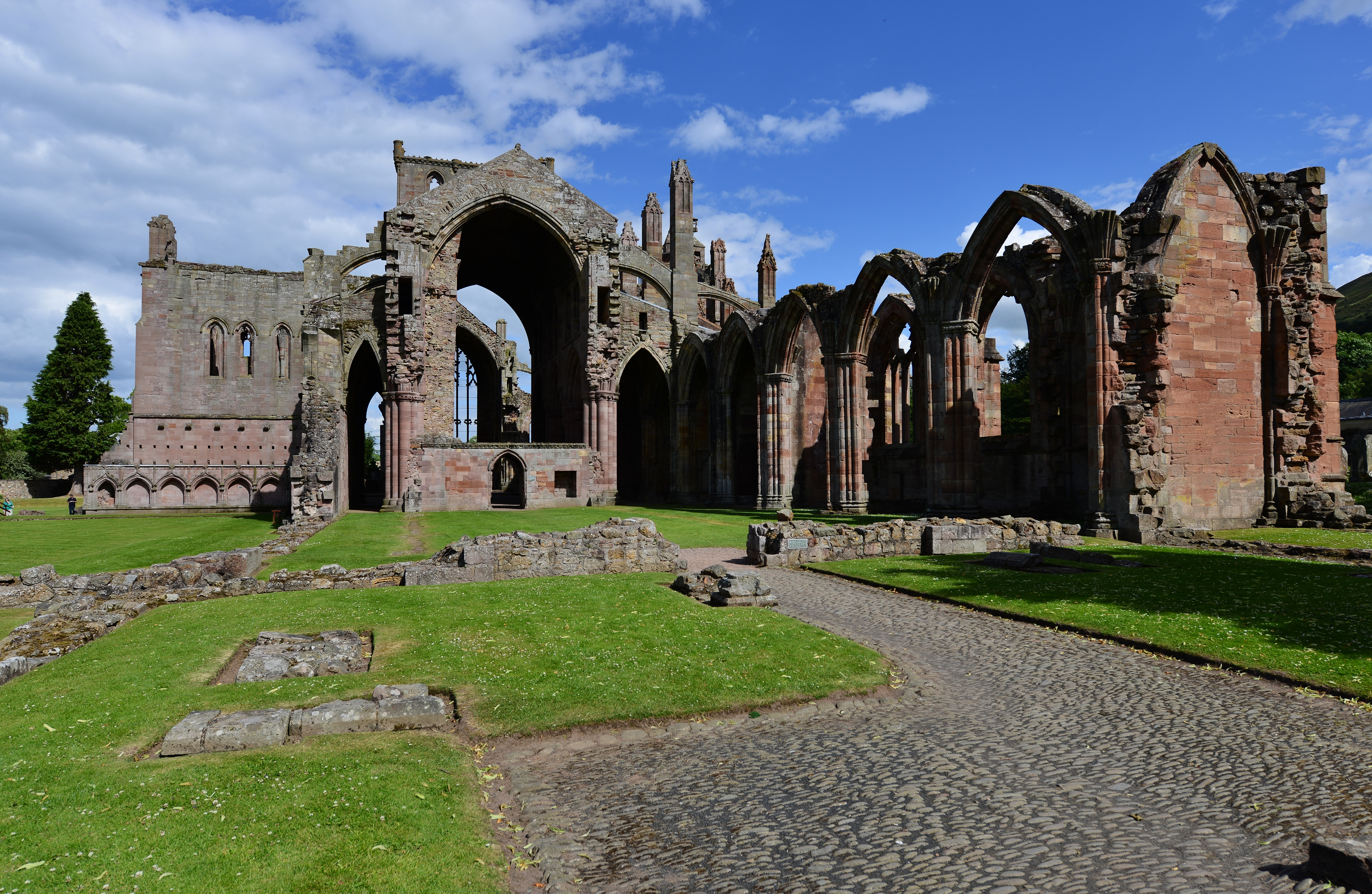
- Melrose Abbey
- Born: Scotland
- Residence: Melrose Abbey
- Died: 698; Scotland
- Canonized: Pre-congregation
- Feast: 26 May

Saint Oduvald (died 698) was a Scottish nobleman, monk, and abbot of Melrose Abbey. His feast day is 26 May.

== Monks of Ramsgate account ==
The monks of St Augustine's Abbey, Ramsgate wrote in their Book of Saints (1921):

Oduvald (St.) Abbot. (May 26)
(7th century) A Scottish nobleman, a monk, and afterwards Abbot of Melrose. He was a contemporary of Saint Cuthbert. He died A.D. 698.

== Butler's account ==
The hagiographer Alban Butler (1710–1773) wrote in his Lives of the Fathers, Martyrs, and Other Principal Saints under May 26:

Saint Oduvald, Abbot and Confessor

This saint was a Scottish nobleman, and governor of the province of Laudon, who, renouncing the world, entered the abbey of Melrose. His joy upon this occasion he expressed by singing those verses of the Psalmist: In the departing of Israel out of Egypt, etc. and, The snare is broken, and we are delivered, etc. During the whole course of his monastic life he was remarkable for his continual advancement in spiritual fervour, and his gift of tears and constant prayer. His sighs after heaven were crowned with a joyful and happy death in 698, ten years after Saint Cuthbert.

== Sources ==
- Butler, Alban (1866), The Lives of the Fathers, Martyrs, and Other Principal Saints, vol. 5, James Duffy This article incorporates text from this source, which is in the public domain.
- St. Augustine's Abbey, Ramsgate (1921), The Book of saints : a dictionary of servants of God canonized by the Catholic Church, London: A. & C. Black, ltd. This article incorporates text from this source, which is in the public domain.
