= Hugh de Roxburgh =

Scottish bishop

Hugh (or Hugo) de Roxburgh (or Hugo Cancellarius) was a late 12th century Chancellor of Scotland and bishop of Glasgow. He was rector of Tullibody and later Archdeacon of St. Andrews. He was elected to the see soon after the death of his predecessor Jocelin. However, it is probable that he was not consecrated, because he died on 10 July 1199, less than four months after his election. He was buried at Jedburgh Abbey.

Political offices
Preceded by Roger de Beaumont	Chancellor of Scotland; 1188–1199	Succeeded by William de Malveisin
Religious titles
Preceded by Jocelin	Bishop of Glasgow elect. 1199	Succeeded by William de Malveisin
