= William de Bevercotes =

13th-century English nobleman

William de Bevercotes, also known as William de Bevercote acted as the Keeper of the Seal of Scotland during 1291-1292 and the Lord Chancellor of Scotland, during the English administration in Scotland from 1304 to 1306.

== Biography ==
He was a Royal Clerk during the reign of Edward I of England. William was appointed as the Keeper of the Seal of Scotland on 5 October 1296. During 1304, William was appointed to the position of Chancellor of Scotland during the English administration in Scotland and served in this function until 1306. William held the manors of Bevercotes, Markeham, Milneton, and Elkesley, in Nottinghamshire for one knight's fee.

William is known to have had two sons, Thomas and John.
