= Roger de Beaumont (bishop) =

- Bishop of St Andrews
- Church: Roman Catholic Church
- Diocese: St Andrews
- Appointed: 1189
- Term ended: 7 July 1202
- Predecessor: Hugh the Chaplain
- Successor: William de Malveisin

Orders
- Consecration: 15 February 1198 by Richard de Lincoln

Personal details
- Died: 7 July 1202 Cambuskenneth, Scotland

Roger de Beaumont (died 1202) was a 12th and 13th century Bishop of St Andrews.

== Life ==
He was the son of Robert de Beaumont, 3rd Earl of Leicester. Roger's position as a younger son of the Earl of Leicester meant that Roger had to seek a fortune elsewhere, and did so within the church. Robert was a second cousin of William I of Scotland, being the great-grandson and grandson of Elizabeth of Vermandois respectively. At Williiam's court Beaumont managed to obtain favour, eventually reaching the position of Chancellor of the King, a post which usually functioned as a prelude to ascending a high-ranking bishopric.

=== Bishop of Saint Andrews ===
So it was that, at Perth in April 1189, he was elected Bishop of St. Andrews. Roger, nevertheless, had to wait nine years for consecration, which was finally performed in 1198 at St. Andrews by the Bishop of Moray and the Bishop of Aberdeen.

During his time as chancellor, Beaumont had been party to the negotiations surrounding the nullification of the treaty of Falaise, and had lobbied the Pope to secure the independence of the Scottish church from the claims of both Nidaros and York to superiority. These demands of the pope were both met, with Clement III issuing a Bull in 1188 confirming that church in Scotland was answerable only to the Holy See. The following year, 8 months after Beaumont's election as bishop, the English King Richard I nullified the Treaty of Falaise, and recognised the independence of the Church.

Bishop Roger was witness to the foundation charter of Inchaffray Abbey in 1200, as earlier he had been for the Abbey of Arbroath in 1178, and it was during his tenure as Bishop that the first St Andrews Castle was built as an episcopal palace.

His episcopate came to an end when he died at Cambuskenneth on 7 July 1202. He was buried at St. Andrews. The next bishop of the see was William de Malveisin.

Political offices
Preceded by Walter de Bidun	Chancellor of Scotland; 1170–1189	Succeeded by Hugh de Roxburgh
Religious titles
Preceded by Hugh the Chaplain	Bishop of St Andrews (Cell Rígmonaid); 1189/98–1202	Succeeded by William de Malveisin
