= Lord Chancellor of Scotland =

Former Great Office of State of the Kingdom of Scotland

The Lord Chancellor of Scotland, formally titled Lord High Chancellor, was an Officer of State in the Kingdom of Scotland. The Lord Chancellor was the principal Great Officer of State, the presiding officer of the Parliament of Scotland, the Keeper of the Great Seal, the presiding officer of the Privy Council (until 1626), and a judge of the College of Justice.

Holders of the office are known from 1123 onwards, but its duties were occasionally performed by an official of lower status with the title of Keeper of the Great Seal. From the 15th century, the Chancellor was normally a bishop or a peer.

Following the Union, the Lord Keeper of the Great Seal of England became the first Lord High Chancellor of Great Britain, but the Earl of Seafield continued as Lord Chancellor of Scotland until 1708. He was re-appointed in 1713 and sat as an Extraordinary Lord of Session in that capacity until his death in 1730.

== List of Lords Chancellors of Scotland ==
=== David I ===
- 1124-1126: John Capellanus
- 1126-1143: Herbert of Selkirk
- bef.1143-1145: Edward, Bishop of Aberdeen
- c.1147–c.1150: William Cumin
- bef.1150-1153: Walter, possibly Walter fitz Alan

=== Malcolm IV ===
- 1153–1165: Enguerrand, Bishop of Glasgow

=== William I ===
- 1165-1171: Nicholas
- c.1171-1178: Walter de Bidun, Bishop of Dunkeld
- c.1178–1189: Roger de Beaumont, Bishop of St Andrews
- 1189–1199: Hugh de Roxburgh, Bishop of Glasgow
- 1199–1202: William de Malveisin, Bishop of Glasgow
- 1203-1210: Florence of Holland, Bishop-elect of Glasgow
- 1211-1224: William del Bois, Archdeacon of Lothian

=== Alexander II ===
- 1226-1227: Thomas de Stirling, Archdeacon of Glasgow
- 1227-1230: Matthew the Scot, Bishop-elect of Dunkeld
- 1231–1233: William de Bondington, Bishop of Glasgow
- 1233-1249: Sir William de Lindsay

=== Alexander III ===
- 1249–1250: Robert de Keldeleth, Abbot of Dunfermline
- 1250-1253: Gamelin, Bishop of St Andrews
- 1256–1257: Richard de Inverkeithing, Bishop of Dunkeld
- 1259-1273: William Wishart, Bishop of Glasgow
- 1273–c.1279: William Fraser, Bishop of St Andrews
- 1285-1291: Thomas Charteris, Archdeacon of Lothian

=== English Appointees during the Interregnum ===
- 1291: Alan de St Edmund, Bishop of Caithness
- 1292: William de Dumfries
- 1292: Alan de Dumfries
- 1294-1295: Thomas de Hunsinghore
- 1295-1296: Alexander Kennedy
- 1296-1304?: Walter de Amersham
- c.1301–c.1305: Nicholas de Balmyle, Bishop of Dunblane
- 1304-1306: William de Bevercotes

=== Robert I ===
- 1308–1328: Bernard, Abbot of Arbroath (later Bishop of the Isles)

=== David II ===
- 1328-1329: Walter de Twynham, Rector of Glasgow Primo
- 1329-1332: Adam de Moravia, Bishop of Brechin
- 1332: William Brisbane
- 1338-1341: William Bullock, Chancellor to Edward Baliol
- 1342: William de Bosco
- 1335x1340–1346: Sir Thomas Charteris
- 1350-1352: William Caldwell
- 1353–1370: Patrick de Leuchars, Bishop of Brechin

=== Robert II ===
- 1370–1377: John de Carrick, Bishop-elect of Dunkeld
- 1377–1390: John de Peebles, Bishop of Dunkeld

=== Robert III ===
- 1394: Duncan Petit, Archdeacon of Glasgow
- 1396-1421: Gilbert de Greenlaw, Bishop of Aberdeen

=== James I ===
- 1422–1425: William Lauder, Bishop of Glasgow
- 1426–1439: John Cameron, Bishop of Glasgow

=== James II ===
- 1439–c.1444: William Crichton, 1st Lord Crichton
- 1444: James Kennedy, Archbishop of Saint Andrews
- 1444-1447: James Bruce, Bishop of Dunkeld and Glasgow
- 1447–1453: William Crichton, 1st Lord Crichton
- 1454–1456: William Sinclair, Earl of Orkney and Caithness
- 1457–1460: George Shoreswood, Bishop of Brechin

=== James III ===
- 1460–1482: Andrew Stewart, 1st Lord Avandale
- 1482–1483: John Laing, Bishop of Glasgow
- 1483: James Livingstone, Bishop of Dunkeld
- 1483–1488: Colin Campbell, 1st Earl of Argyll

=== James IV ===
- 1488 (Feb–Jun): William Elphinstone, Bishop of Aberdeen
- 1488–1492: Colin Campbell, 1st Earl of Argyll
- 1493–1497: Archibald Douglas, 5th Earl of Angus
- 1497–1501: George Gordon, 2nd Earl of Huntly
- 1501–1504: James Stewart, Duke of Ross
- 1510–1513: Alexander Stewart (d. 1513), Archbishop of St Andrews

=== James V ===
- 1513–1526: James Beaton, Archbishop of Glasgow (later Archbishop of St Andrews)
- 1527–1528: Archibald Douglas, 6th Earl of Angus
- 1528–1543: Gavin Dunbar, Archbishop of Glasgow

=== Mary I ===
- 1543–1546: David Beaton, Archbishop of St Andrews
- 1546–1562: George Gordon, 4th Earl of Huntly
- 1563–1566: James Douglas, 4th Earl of Morton
- 1566–1567: George Gordon, 5th Earl of Huntly

=== James VI ===
- 1567–1573: James Douglas, 4th Earl of Morton
- 1573 (Jan–Sep): Archibald Campbell, 5th Earl of Argyll
- 1573–1578: John Lyon, 8th Lord Glamis
- 1578–1579: John Stewart, 4th Earl of Atholl
- 1579–1584: Colin Campbell, 6th Earl of Argyll
- 1584–1585: James Stewart, Earl of Arran
- 1586–1595: John Maitland, 1st Lord Maitland of Thirlestane
- 1599–1604: John Graham, 3rd Earl of Montrose
- 1604–1622: Alexander Seton, 1st Earl of Dunfermline
- 1622–1634: George Hay, 1st Earl of Kinnoull

=== Charles I ===
- 1635–1638: John Spottiswoode, Archbishop of St Andrews
- 1638–1641: James Hamilton, 1st Duke of Hamilton
- 1641–1660: John Campbell, 1st Earl of Loudoun

=== Charles II ===
- 1660–1664: William Cunningham, 9th Earl of Glencairn
- 1664–1681: John Leslie, 7th Earl of Rothes (1st Duke of Rothes from 29 May 1680)
- 1681-1682: Office vacant
- 1682–1684: George Gordon, 1st Earl of Aberdeen

=== James VII ===
- 1684–1689: James Drummond, 4th Earl of Perth

=== William III and Mary II ===
- 1689-1692: In commission
- 1692–1696: John Hay, 1st Marquess of Tweeddale
- 1696–1702: Patrick Hume, 1st Earl of Marchmont

=== Anne ===
- 1702–1704: James Ogilvy, 1st Earl of Seafield
- 1704–1705: John Hay, 2nd Marquess of Tweeddale
- 1705–1707: James Ogilvy, 1st Earl of Seafield

== See also ==
- Director of Chancery
- Privy Council of Scotland
- Treasurer of Scotland
- Treasurer-depute of Scotland
- Secretary of State, Scotland
- List of Masters of Requests
