= Archdeacon of Glasgow =

The Archdeacon of Glasgow was the head of the Archdeaconry of Glasgow, a sub-division of the Diocese of Glasgow. He was one of two archdeacons serving the Bishop of Glasgow, the other one being the Archdeacon of Teviotdale. This archdeacon (Glasgow) was responsible for region of the Diocese of Glasgow outside the Teviotdale region of the Scottish Borders region. The position was an important position within the medieval Scottish church, because of the high number of parish churches in the archdeaconry.

== List of archdeacons of Glasgow ==
- Ascelin, 1126 x 1127–1153 x 1159
- Enguerrand, 1161 x 1162–1164
- Simon, 1166 x 1174–1195 x 1196
- Robert, 1195 x 1196–1222
- Thomas, 1222
- Thomas de Contravel, 1222–1227
- Hugh de Potton, 1227–1238
- Matthew de Aberdeen, 1238 x 1244
- Reginald de Irvine, 1245–1266 x 1268
- William de Lindsay, 1275
- James de Dalileye 1306–1308 x 1311
- John Wishart, x 1310–1337
- Guido Kieretti, 1342–1374
- Gregory de Maybole (?), 1367–1387
- Thomas Mercer, 1374 x 1377 -1379 x 1388
- Duncan Petit, 1388–1397
- John de Grangia, x 1394
- Henry de Wardlaw, x 1394–1403
- William MacMorrin, x 1403
- Simon de Mandeville, 1403–1409
  - William de Camera, 1403
  - John Forrester, 1403
- John Forrester, 1409–1414
  - William de Glendinning, 1409–1413
  - John Stewart, 1413–1414
- George de Borthwick, 1414–1446
- John Arous, 1447 x 1448–1468
- Archibald Whitelaw, 1468
- Hugh 'Danslas', 1468
- Gilbert Rerik, 1468–149
- John Gibson, 1495
- Patrick Blackadder, 1502 x 1505–1521 x 1524
- Alexander Dick, 1523 x 1538-1559x1560
- John Abercrombie, 1562
- Andrew Betoun, 1560–1563 x 1573
- Archibald Douglas, 1573–1610
- Theodore Hay, 1610–1638

== Bibliography ==
- Watt, D.E.R., Fasti Ecclesiae Scotinanae Medii Aevi ad annum 1638, 2nd Draft, (St Andrews, 1969), pp. 170–4

== See also ==
- Archdeacon of Teviotdale
- Bishop of Glasgow
