= Walter de Amersham =

13th-century English nobleman

Walter de Amersham, also known as Walter de Agsmundesham (died 1304) was the Lord Chancellor of Scotland during the English administration in Scotland from 1296 to 1304.

== Biography ==
He was a Royal Clerk and Justice of the Peace during the reign of Edward I of England. He was appointed in 1291 as assistant to Alan de St Edmund, the Chancellor for Scotland. Walter was paid 10 merks every month for his service. On 27 June 1292 Walter issued a receipt for 27s 6d received from the Chamberlain of Scotland as arrears of his fee while associate of the late Chancellor Berwick. During 1296, Walter was appointed to the position of Chancellor of Scotland during the English administration in Scotland and served in this function until his death in 1304.

Walter was rector of St Thomas's Church Old Winchelsea from 1269 to 1277. During his time as rector, the town suffered inundation from the sea and Walter would have been required to support a town in peril. Matthew Green writes: In the winter of 1271 the quay on the south side of St Thomas the Martyr had been 'carried away by the floods and tempests of the sea' clawing away some of the church and gravelly imperilling it. In 1287 the church was lost and Walter's successor, Adam, also of Agmondesham was required to build a new church in New Winchelsea on higher ground in the centre of a town planned by Edward I.

Walter became a Justice and is recorded in 1282/3 holding an assize of mort d'ancestor with Robert Fulks at Henley, relating to property in Lillingstone Lovell. In 1286/7 he received a commission 'to hear the complaints of the men of the ancient demesne manor of Cookham against the bailiff of Queen Eleanor and return them to the King's Bench with return'.

Walter retained property in Agmondesham (Amersham). Between November 1301 and November 1302 he granted messuages, rent and land in Amersham to Sarra Attenshe for life with remainder to Thomas de Wouburn. An article written by Eustace Allott can be found on Amersham Museum website. Walter is known to have had two sons Alan and Thomas, whom his property was divided between.
