= Jocelin of Furness =

English Cistercian hagiographer

Jocelin of Furness (Note: Also rendered Jocelyne or Jocelyn.) (fl. 1175–1214) was an English Cistercian hagiographer, known for his Lives of Saint Waltheof, Saint Patrick, Saint Kentigern and Saint Helena of Constantinople. He is probably responsible for the popular legendary association of Saint Patrick with snakes, which he purportedly cast out of Ireland.

== Biography ==
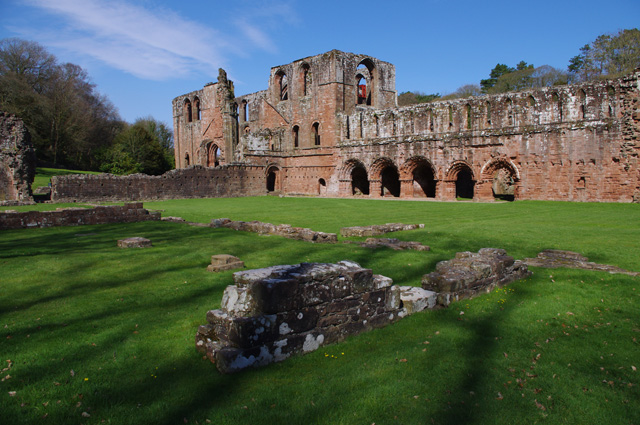
The transepts and cloister of Furness Abbey.

He was a monk of Furness Abbey (now in Barrow-in-Furness, Cumbria), and translated or adapted Celtic hagiographical material for Anglo-Norman readers. He wrote for Jocelin, Bishop of Glasgow, a Life of Kentigern, and for John de Courcy and Thomas (Tommaltach), Archbishop of Armagh a Life of St Patrick. His Life of Waltheof was written to promote the cult of a former abbot of Melrose. The Life of St Helena was probably commissioned by a female community in England. Another work attributed to him was a book of British bishops.

It has been claimed that he was also Abbot of Rushen Abbey, and an architect, but this is one of several different identifications which have been put forward.

== Writings ==
Jocelin's writings are the topic of a major survey by Helen Birkett, and a volume of conference proceedings.

- Life of St Patrick, ed. by Ingrid Sperber and Ludwig Bieler, in Royal Irish Academy Archive of Celtic-Latin literature, ed. by Anthony Harvey and Angela Malthouse (2nd development and expanded edition, ACLL-2), https://www.brepolis.net (subscription)
- The most ancient lives of Saint Patrick, including the life by Jocelin, by James O'Leary (New York, 1904) (free)
- Life of St Kentigern, ed. and trans. Alexander Penrose Forbes, Lives of S. Ninian and S. Kentigern (Edinburgh, 1874)
- Life of St Waltheof, ed. by George McFadden, 'An Edition and Translation of the Life of Waldef, Abbot of Melrose, by Jocelin of Furness' (unpublished PhD thesis, Columbia University, 1952)
- The Life of St Helena (1198 × 1214), ed. by Antonina Harbus, Helena of Britain in Medieval Legend (Cambridge: Brewer, 2002); trans. by Ingrid Sperber and Clare Downham, 'The Life of St Helena by Jocelin of Furness'.
