= Glasgow Fair =

Annual holiday in Glasgow, Scotland

- Date: Last 2 weeks in July; This Year: 20th July 2026
- Frequency: Annual

The Glasgow Fair is a holiday usually held during the second half of July in Glasgow, Scotland. 'The Fair' is the oldest of similar holidays and dates to the 12th century. The fair's earliest incarnation occurred in 1190, when Bishop Jocelin obtained permission from King William the Lion to hold the festivities.

Until the 1960s, most local businesses and factories closed on 'Fair Friday' to allow workers and their families to attend, typically spending their time in the Firth of Clyde or Ayrshire coast. This practice was known as going "doon the watter" (literally "down the water" in the Glasgow dialect).

== The Fair ==
The Glasgow Fair was originally held within the boundaries of Glasgow Cathedral; from the 1800s onward, the fair has taken place on Bellahouston Park. In its earliest incarnations, the fair focused on economic practicalities such as the sale of horses and cattle. In the modern era, the fair has become known for its amusements, with circus and theatre shows as centrepieces.

The Glasgow Fair has been a nexus for travelling showmen, who congregate in order to take advantage of the large audiences. This provided the fair with a diverse roster of entertainers and performances. The 1912 fair, for example, featured a traditional penny gaff as well as short melodramas. The Glasgow Fair also served to introduce attendees to changes in industry and commerce. The 1912 fair also presented a scenic railway that took visitors on a simulated ride through Japan and back to Scotland.

Starting in the 1900s, the Glasgow Fair focused on introducing attendees to global events. In 1917, the following advertisement was printed in a local publication on:

No longer need we envy the privileged few who visit the battlefields of France and Belgium. A visit to Green's Carnival at Whitevale, Gallowgate permits us for the small sum of twopence to go over one of the world’s most historic salients. Wounded soldiers who have taken part in the fighting in and around Ypres have conceived the idea of constructing a full sized reproduction of the Trenches, with Dug-outs, Trench Hospitals, and Dressing Stations. Officers and men's sleeping quarters, telegraph stations, ruined farmhouses and their devastated interiors. We are further permitted to examine the trench mortars, periscopes and the 'plum puddings' the Huns so dislike; also the toffee-apples, the latest pattern of bomb; specimens of German helmets and guns; unexploded shells and anti-aircraft guns are all in evidence. Barbed wire entanglements and gun-carriage wheels give realistic touches to the ridges, sand-bags by the million form embankments and defences on the most modern plans. This visit is as instructive as it is entertaining. Private George Wilson, Edinburgh's Newsboy V.C and others who have helped make history by their bravery will act as guides and explain the ins and outs of Trench life to visitors. The Carnival at Whitevale has long been one of Glasgow's holiday attractions and this year it will prove a veritable mecca for those in need of recreation and amusement.

The fair continues to be held annually, though attendance gradually decreased and a large portion of the fair was relocated to Vinegarhill.

== In literature and popular culture ==
Neil Munro satirised the various ways in which Glaswegians enjoyed the Fair in the early Twentieth Century in his Erchie MacPherson story, "The Fair", first published in the Glasgow Evening News on 11th July 1904.

The activities of Glaswegians on the Ayrshire coast during the Glasgow Fair are celebrated by Billy Connolly in his song Saltcoats at the Fair, first released on The Humblebums' First Collection of Merry Melodies album (Transatlantic TRA186, February 1969).

== See also ==
- Artisanal food
- Charter
- Hawker
- History of marketing
- List of Renaissance fairs
- Market town
- Marketing
- Market (place)
- Market hall
- Merchant
- Retail
- Town privileges
