= Abbot of Melrose =

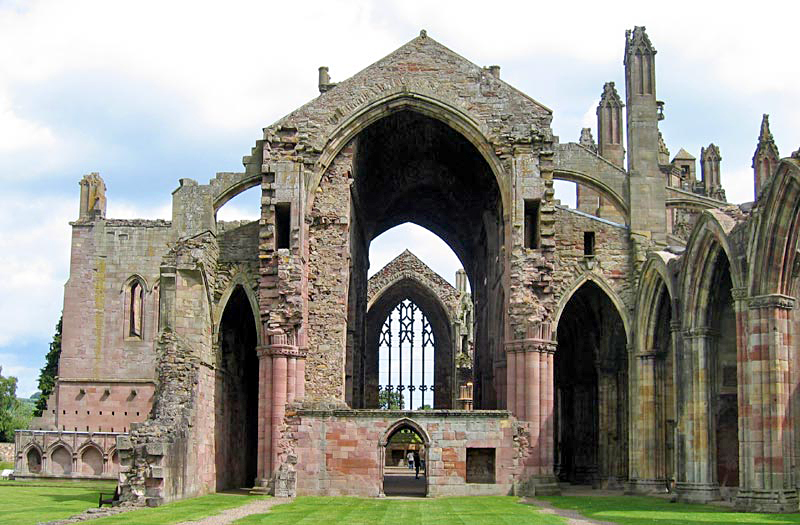
The ruins of Melrose Abbey as they were in June 2004.

The Abbot and then Commendator of Melrose was the head of the monastic community of Melrose Abbey, in Melrose in the Borders region of Scotland. The abbots of the earlier Northumbrian foundation from Lindisfarne are not included here. The second abbey was founded in 1136 on the patronage of David I (Dabíd mac Maíl Choluim), King of Scots, by Cistercian monks from Rievaulx Abbey, Yorkshire. Control of the abbey was secularized in the 16th century and after the accession of James Stewart, the abbey was held by commendators. The last commendator, James Douglas of Lochleven, resigned the abbacy to William Douglas, 6th Earl of Morton (his nephew) in December 1606, and the abbey itself to the king in 1608. The abbey (or most of its lands) was then erected into a secular lordship for viscount Haddington, John Ramsay, who in 1609 was created "Lord Melrose". Lochleven however resumed the title of commendator in 1613 until his death in 1620.

== List of Abbots ==
- Richard, 1136-1148
- St. Waltheof, 1148-1159
- William, 1159-1170
- Jocelin, 1170-1174
- Laurence, 1175-1178
- Ernald, 1179-89
- Reiner, 1189-94
- Radulf (I), 1194-1202
- William, 1202-06
- Patrick, 1206-07
- Adam, 1207-13
- Hugh de Clipstone, 1214-15
- William de Courcy, 1215-6
- Radulf II, 1216-1219
- Adam de Harkarres, 1219-46
- Matthew, 1246-61
- Adam of Maxton, 1261-67
- John de Edrom (or Ederham), 1267-68 x 69
- Robert de Keldeleth, 1269-73
- Patrick de Selkirk, 1273–96
- ???
- William de Fogo, 1310–1329
- Thomas de Soutra, 1333 x 1335-x1342
- William de St Andrews, 1342–1376
- Gilbert de Roxburgh, 1391–1392
- David Benyng (or Binning), 1394–1422
- John Fogo, 1425–1434
- Richard Londy (or Lundy), 1440–1444
- Andrew Hunter, 1444-1465
- Robert Blackadder, 1471–1483
- Richard Lamb, 1472-1483
- John Brown (or Carnecorss), 1483–1486
- ???, 1486
- ???, 1486
- David Brown, 1486-1507/10
  - Bernard Bell, rival to David Brown, 1486–1503
  - William Turnbull, rival to David Brown, 1503-1507
- Robert Betoun, 1507/10-1521 x 1524
- John Maxwell, 1524-1526
- Andrew Durie, 1525-1541

== List of Commendators ==
- James Stewart, 1535-1557
- Louis de Guise, 1558-1559
- James Balfour, 1559–1564
- Michael Balfour, 1564–1568
- James Douglas of Lochleven, 1569-1620

== Bibliography ==
- Cowan, Ian B. & Easson, David E., Medieval Religious Houses: Scotland With an Appendix on the Houses in the Man, Second Edition, (London, 1976), pp. 76–77
- Fawcett, Richard, & Oram, Richard, Melrose Abbey, (Stroud, 2004)
- Watt, D.E.R. & Shead, N.F. (eds.), The Heads of Religious Houses in Scotland from the 12th to the 16th Centuries (The Scottish Records Society, New Series, Volume 24), (Edinburgh, 2001), pp. 149–55
