= Archdeacon of Teviotdale =

The Archdeacon of Teviotdale was the head of the Archdeaconry of Teviotdale, a sub-division of the Diocese of Glasgow. He was one of two archdeacons serving the Bishop of Glasgow. As the name describes, this archdeacon was responsible for the Teviotdale region of the Scottish Borders region. The position was an important position within the medieval Scottish church; because of the high number of parish churches in the archdeaconry.

== List of archdeacons of Teviotdale ==
- Peter de Alinton 1238–1242
- Reginald de Irvine 1242–1245
- Nicholas de Moffat, 1245–1270
- William Wishart, 1288–1297 x 1308
- Roger de Welleton, 1307–1310
- William de Hillum, 1312
- William de Yetholm 1320 x 1321–1329
- John de Berwick, x 1354
- John de Boulton, 1354
- Henry de Smalham, 1354–1358 x 1364
- John de Ancrum, 1364–1393
- Thomas de "Mathane", 1394
- John de Merton, 1394–1400 x 1404
- John Forrester, 1418
- William Croyser, 1418–1440 x 1443; 1446 x 1451–1460 x 1461
- John de Scheves, 1418–1419
- John Lyon, 1418–1418 x 1423
- Edward de Lauder, x 1419
- Alexander de Foulertoun, 1422 x 1424
- John Bowmaker, x 1424–1428
- Andrew de Hawick, 1424–1425
- John Benyng, 1426
- William Croyser
- James Croyser, 1440
- Walter Blair, 1441–1447
- Patrick Hume, 1443–1472
- Alexander Inglis, 1471
- John Lichton, 1472
- David Luthirdale, 1474–1475
- John Whitelaw, 1475
- Nicholas Forman, 1478 x 1479
- James Doles, 1478
- John Brown, 1479
- William Elphinstone junior, 1479–1481
- William Elphinstone senior, 1481 x 1482–1486
- John Martini, 1486 x 1491 (?), x 1510
- William Ker, 1491,1510–1511
- George'Berber', 1509
- George Lockhart, 1509 x 1520–1533
- Thomas Ker, x 1534
- John Lauder, 1534–1551
- John Hepburn, 1544–1564 x 1565
- Robert Richardson, 1552–1565
- Thomas Ker, 1565–1569

== Bibliography ==
- Watt, D.E.R., Fasti Ecclesiae Scotinanae Medii Aevi ad annum 1638, 2nd Draft, (St Andrews, 1969), pp. 174–9

== See also ==
- Archdeacon of Glasgow
- Bishop of St Andrews
