= Vita Sancti Kentigerni =

Hagiography of Saint Kentigern

The Vita Sancti Kentigerni ("Life of Saint Kentigern") is a hagiography of Saint Kentigern (also known as St. Mungo) written in Latin circa 1200 by Jocelyn of Furness. He wrote this hagiography under the direction of Jocelin of Glasgow.

== Manuscripts and printed texts ==
The first Life of Kentigern was written at the instigation of Bishop of Glasgow, Herbert of Selkirk and was rewritten by Jocelin of Furness, circa 1190.

In 1874, Vita sancti kentigerni was edited by Alexander Penrose Forbes in The Historians of Scotland. The Latin text was printed in this edition as well as an English translation of it. The preface to this edition gives references to the two remaining manuscripts. One of them remains in Marsh's library in Dublin, the other one is in the British Library.
