= Melrose Abbey =

Partly ruined monastery in Melrose, Scotland

Coordinates: 55°35′56″N 2°43′4″W

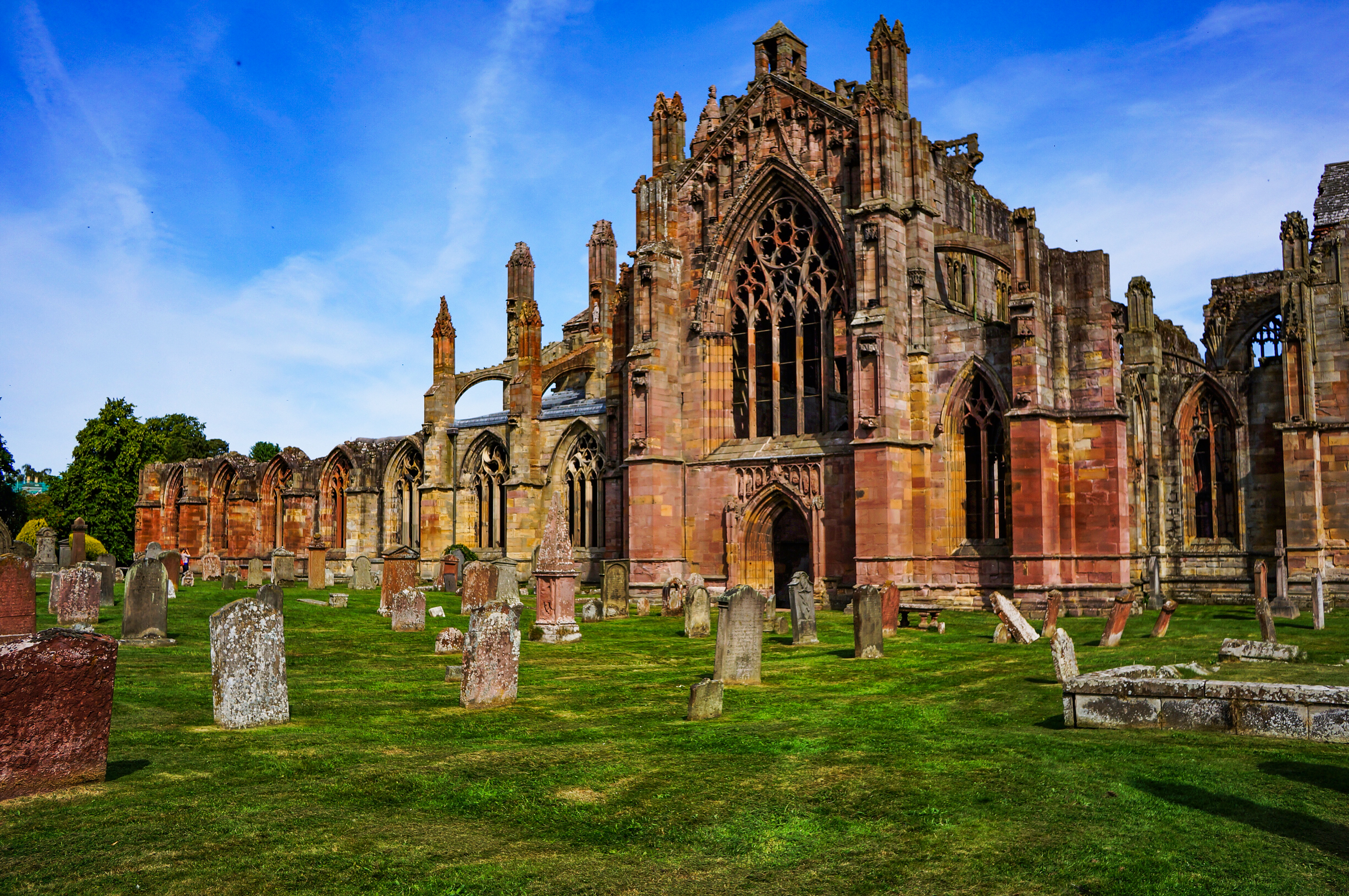
- Interactive map of Melrose Abbey

Monastery information
- Order: Cistercian
- Established: 1136
- Disestablished: 1609
- Mother house: Rievaulx Abbey
- Diocese: Diocese of Glasgow
- Controlled churches: Cavers Magna; Dunscore; Ettrick; Hassendean; Mauchline; Melrose; Ochiltree; Tarbolton; Westerkirk; Wilton

People
- Founder: David I of Scotland
- Important associated figures: Waltheof, Jocelin

Site
- Location: Melrose, Scottish Borders

St Mary's Abbey, Melrose is a partly ruined monastery of the Cistercian order in Melrose, Roxburghshire, in the Scottish Borders. It was founded in 1136 by Cistercian monks at the request of King David I of Scotland and was the chief house of that order in the country until the Reformation. It was headed by the abbot or commendator of Melrose. Today the abbey is maintained by Historic Environment Scotland as a scheduled monument.

The east end of the abbey was completed in 1146. Other buildings in the complex were added over the next 50 years. The abbey was built in the Gothic manner and in the form of a St. John's Cross. A considerable portion of the abbey is now in ruins. A structure dating from 1590 is maintained as a museum open to the public.

Alexander II and other Scottish kings and nobles are buried at the abbey. A lead container believed to hold the embalmed heart of Robert the Bruce was found in 1921 below the Chapter House site; it was found again in a 1998 excavation and documented in records of his death. The rest of his body is buried in Dunfermline Abbey.

The abbey is known for its many carved decorative details, including likenesses of saints, dragons, gargoyles and plants. On one of the abbey's stairways is an inscription by John Morow, a master mason, which says, Be halde to ye hende ("Keep in mind, the end, your salvation"). This has become the motto of the town of Melrose.

== History ==
=== Old Melrose ===
An earlier monastery was founded by, then later dedicated to, Saint Aidan of Lindisfarne on a site about 2.5 miles (4 km) east of Melrose Abbey. This was shortly before his death in 651 at Bamburgh. Set in a bend of the River Tweed, a graveyard marks the site. Saint Cuthbert (died 687), who grew up nearby, trained at Old Melrose abbey. He was prior from 662 before he moved to Lindisfarne (Holy Island). Æthelweald was a novice at Lindisfarne when Cuthbert became bishop. He attended Cuthbert on some of his missionary journeys, and witnessed at least one of his miracles. He later became prior and then abbot at Melrose. Saint Oduvald (died 698) was a Scottish nobleman who followed Cuthbert as abbot. The visionary Dryhthelm was also a monk there in the early eighth century. The abbey site was raided by Kenneth I of Scotland in 839.

=== Cistercian abbey ===
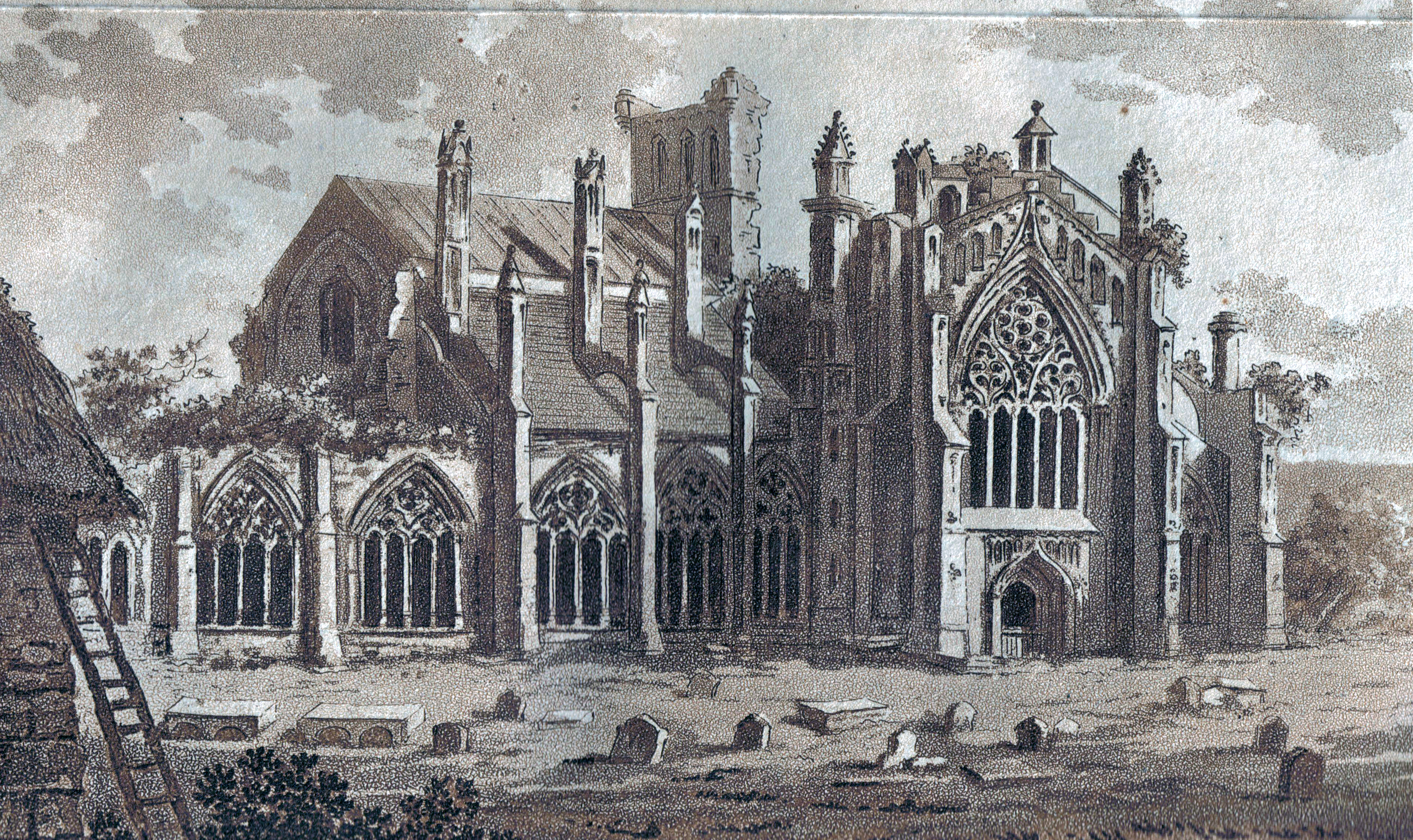
Melrose Abbey in 1800, when part of the abbey was still in use as the parish church

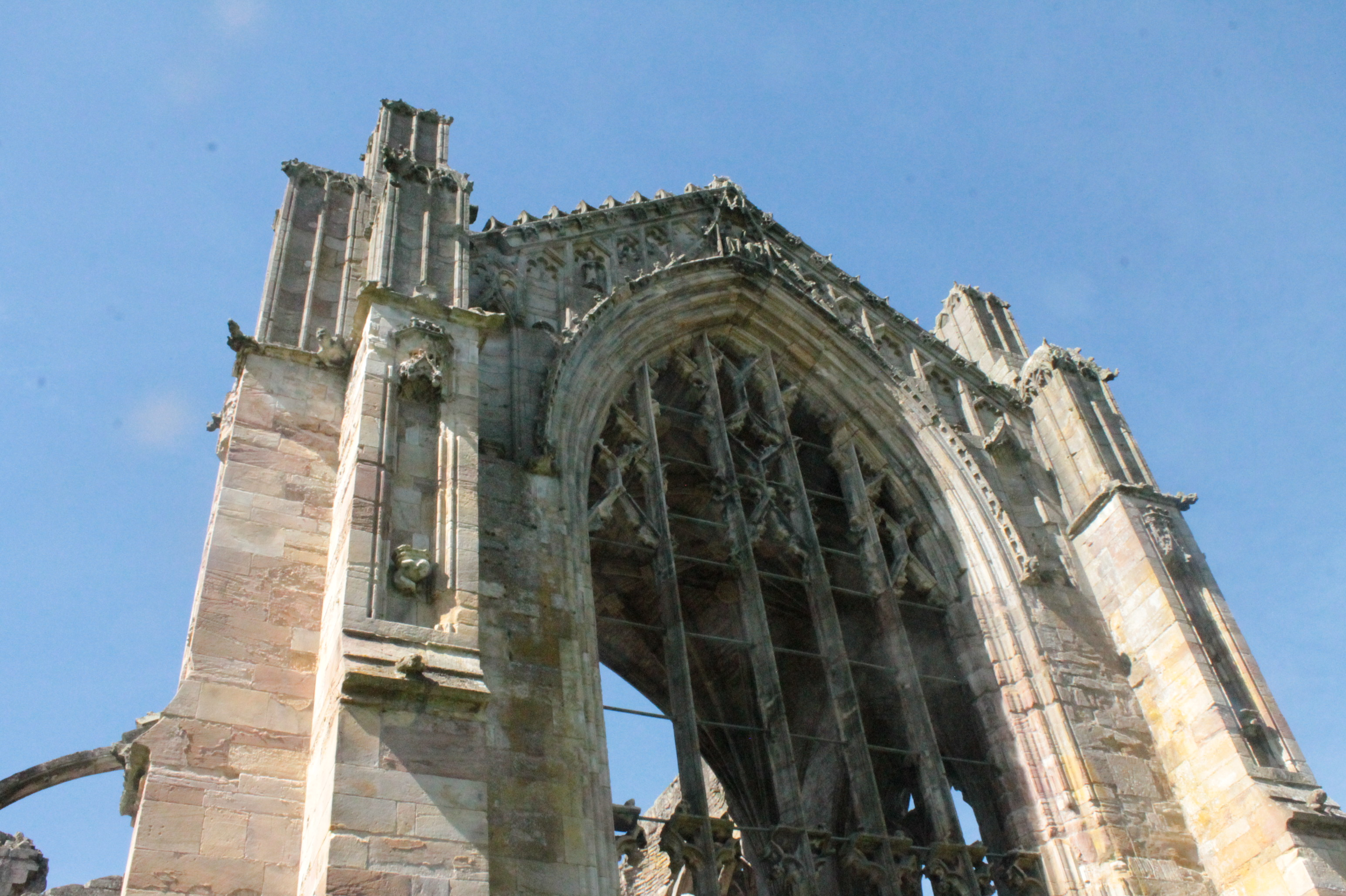
East gable and window, Melrose Abbey

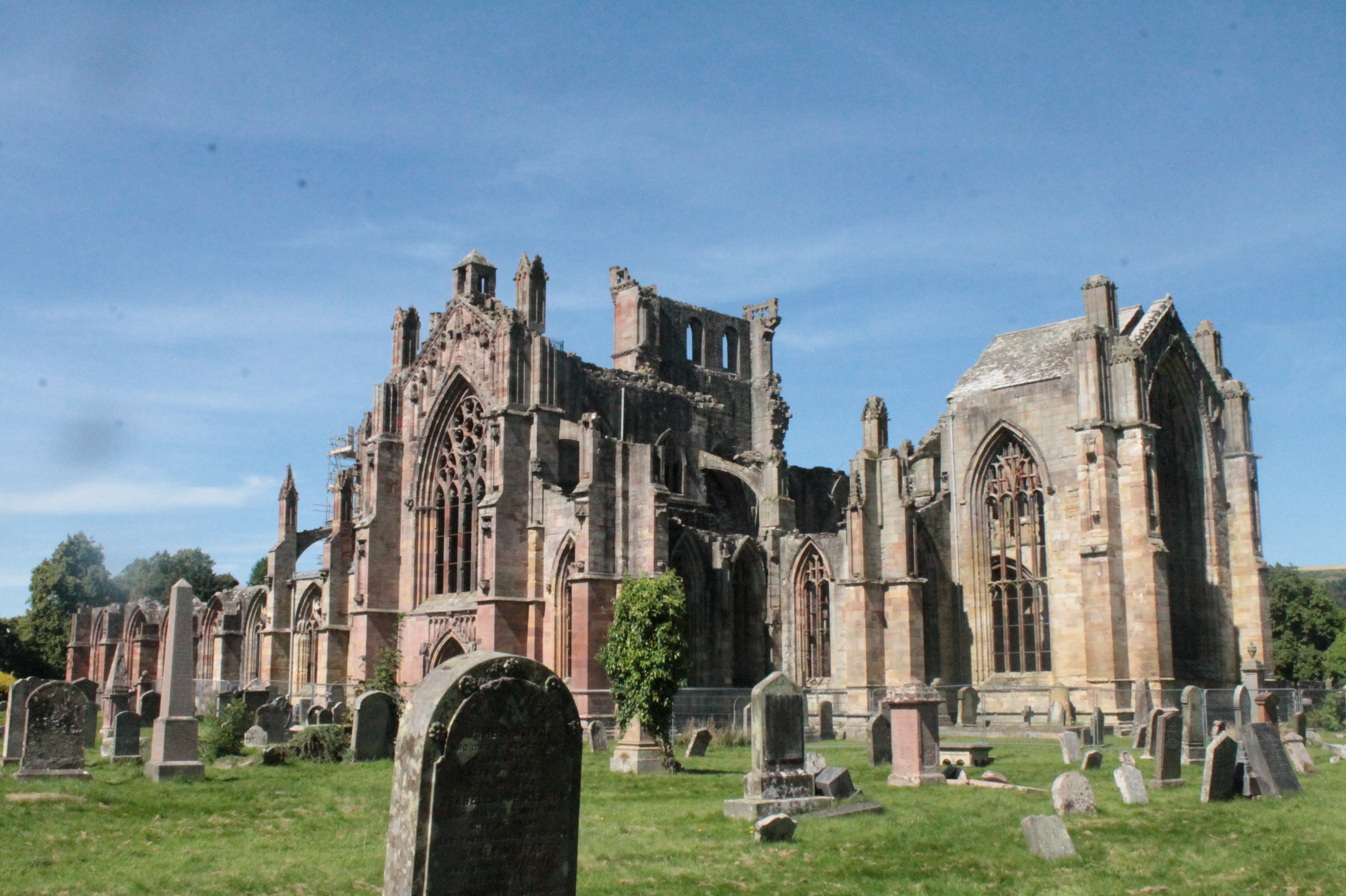
Melrose Abbey from the south-east

Melrose was the first Cistercian abbey in Scotland. King David I wanted the new abbey to be built on the same site, but the Cistercians insisted that the land was not good enough for farming and selected the current site. It was said to have been built in ten years. The church of the convent was dedicated to the Virgin Mary (like all Cistercian houses) on 28 July 1146. The abbey became the mother church of the order in Scotland. Its first community came from Rievaulx Abbey, the North Yorkshire house colonised from Cîteaux.

In the 12th century, around Melrose, the Cistercians implemented new farming techniques and marketed Melrose wool throughout the great trading ports across northern Europe. The abbey established granges for its sheep flocks at Penshiel, Hartside, Edmundston and Friardykes in the catchment of the Whiteadder in the Lammermuirs, leading to disputes over grazing rights with the tenants of the Earl of Dunbar. Encroachment of the abbey's livestock into the royal forest between the Leader and Gala Waters resulted in disputes with its keepers, the Morville lords of Lauderdale. In 1164, Dryburgh Abbey yielded Colmslie and adjacent woodland to Melrose.

A town slowly grew up around the abbey. During a time of famine four thousand starving people were fed by the monastery for three months.

The monastery had 100 monks, exclusive of the abbot and dignitaries. The privileges and possessions of the abbey were very extensive. Its founder David endowed it with the lands of Melrose, Eildon, and other places; and the right of fishery on the River Tweed. Succeeding monarchs increased their property. The house was famed for its wealth, for many of its abbots were men of distinction and honour. Waltheof of Melrose, stepson of King David and at one time prior of Kirkham, was abbot of Melrose from 1148 to 1159. He endowed Melrose with a reputation for sanctity and learning which placed it on a par with houses such as Fountains and Rievaulx and made it the premier abbey in Scotland. The tomb of St. Waltheof, in the chapter house, later became the focus of pilgrimage.

One of the earliest accounts of the Magna Carta agreement reached at Runnymede in 1215 is found in the Chronicle of Melrose Abbey. Melrose was located on one of the main roads running from Edinburgh to the south making it particularly vulnerable to attack. In 1322, the town was attacked by the army of Edward II of England, and much of the abbey was destroyed. It was rebuilt by order of King Robert the Bruce, with Sir James Douglas being the principal auditor of finance for the project. In 1385, the abbey was burned by the army of Richard II of England, "partly because of support for the Avignon Pope Clement VII" he forced the army of Robert II of Scotland back to Edinburgh. It was rebuilt over a period of about 100 years – construction was still unfinished when James IV visited in 1504.

From 1541, the abbacy was held by a series of commendators. In 1544, as English armies raged across Scotland in an effort to force the Scots to marry the infant Mary, Queen of Scots to the son of Henry VIII, the abbey was again badly damaged and was never fully repaired. On 29 September 1549 an English soldier discovered the pyx that had been suspended over the high altar and gave it to the Earl of Rutland. War damage led to its decline as a working monastery. The last abbot was James Stuart (an illegitimate son of James V), who died in 1557. In 1590, Melrose's last monk died.

The abbey withstood one final assault, and some of its walls still show the marks of cannon fire after having been bombarded by Oliver Cromwell's troops during the Wars of the Three Kingdoms. In 1618, a portion of the abbey's church was converted into a parish church for the surrounding town. A plain vault was inserted into the crossing, removing the original ribbed vaulting in the central section. It was used until 1810, when a new church was erected in the town. In 1812, a stone coffin was exhumed from the aisle in the abbey's south chancel. Some speculated the remains were those of Michael Scot, the philosopher and "wizard".

At the beginning of the nineteenth century, Sir Walter Scott was appointed Sheriff-Depute of Roxburghshire. Sir Walter supervised the extensive repair work funded by the Duke of Buccleuch that was to preserve the ruins. In 1918, the duke gave the ruins to the state. It is now in the care of Historic Environment Scotland.

=== Robert the Bruce ===
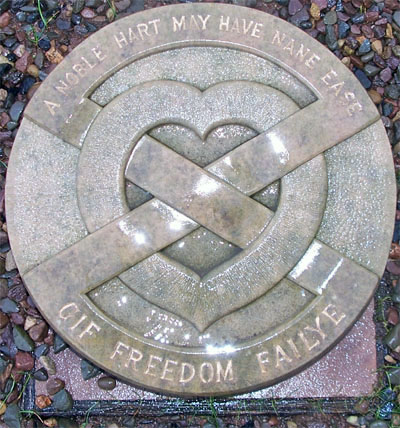
Modern marker for the site of the burial of the heart of Robert the Bruce at Melrose Abbey

Robert Bruce's heart is said to have been buried in the church, perhaps brought back from a crusade with the body of Lord Douglas in either 1330 or 1331. The position was marked by a small metal plaque.

In 1996, an archaeological excavation on the site unearthed a conical lead container and an engraved copper plaque that read "The enclosed leaden casket containing a heart was found beneath Chapter House floor, March 1921, by His Majesty's Office of Works." The casket was investigated by AOC archaeology in Leith and contained a still recognisable human heart in a thick black liquor. As there are no records of anyone else's heart being buried at Melrose it was presumed to be that of Robert the Bruce. The container was reburied at Melrose Abbey on 22 June 1998 under a memorial stone.

There was no attempt to use DNA to see if the heart belonged to King Robert. There is no record of any other heart being buried on the site; however, the Chapter House would be an unusual location for a king's heart to be buried: most high-status burials would have happened next to the altar.

== Description ==
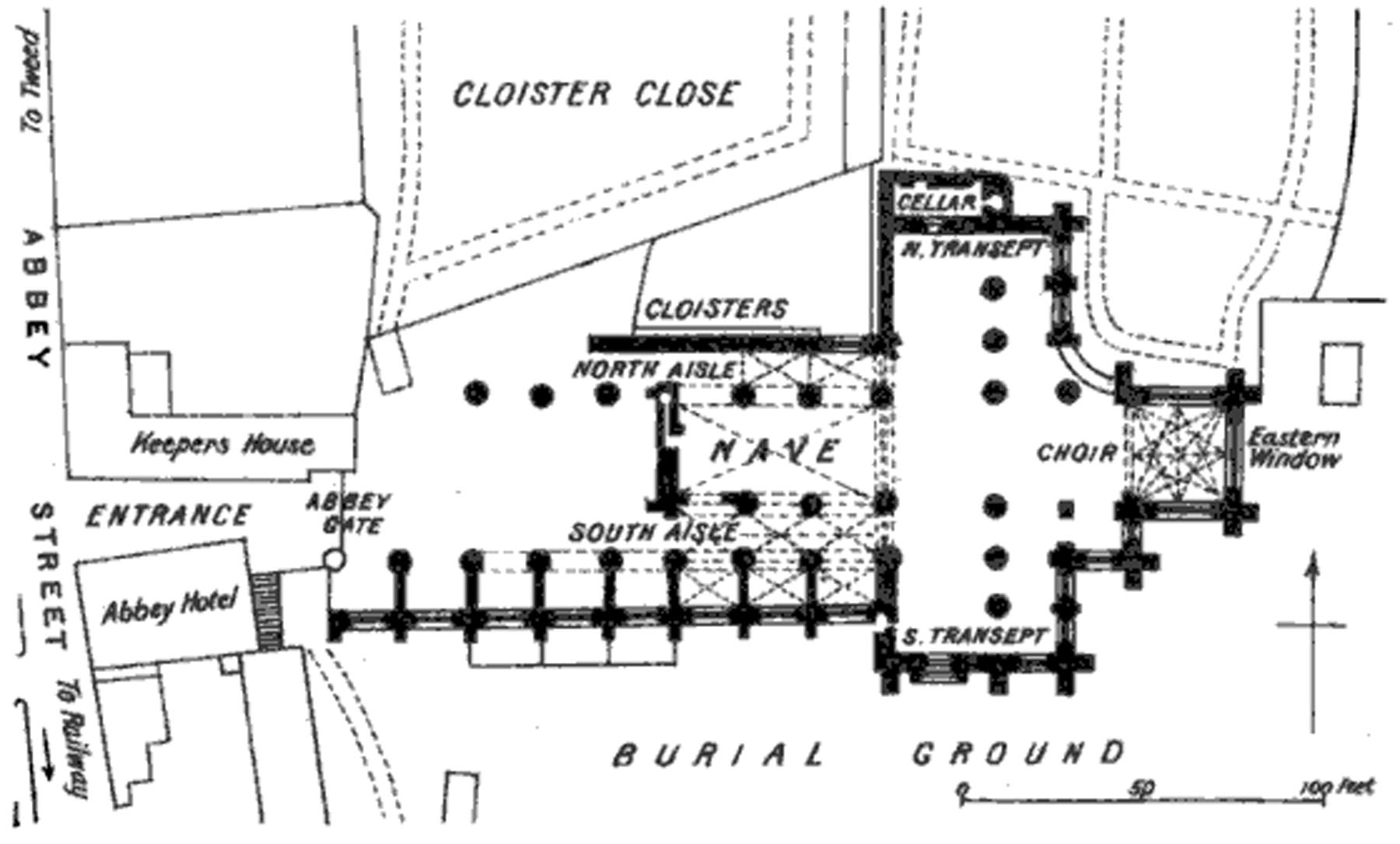
Ground plan of Melrose Abbey

The abbey is laid out on a traditional east–west axis. The west section is almost wholly absent other than its foundations. The eastern section is more intact. A graveyard serving the local community lies to the south and southeast of the abbey. The majority of stones date from the 19th century. The abbey is the only Scottish abbey to still retain some of its original floor tiles. The northern cloisters are equally erased to foundation level.

== Abbots ==
- Eata first abbot, a pupil of Aidan, Bishop of Lindisfarne.
- Richard Lambe was abbot in 1473.
- Robert Betoun was abbot in 1519.
- Thomas Ker was abbot in 1524.
- William Ker commendator (died before 31 July 1566).
- Michael Balfour commendator in 1568.
- James Douglas, abbot and commendator from 1 May 1569 to 9 December 1606.

== Gallery ==
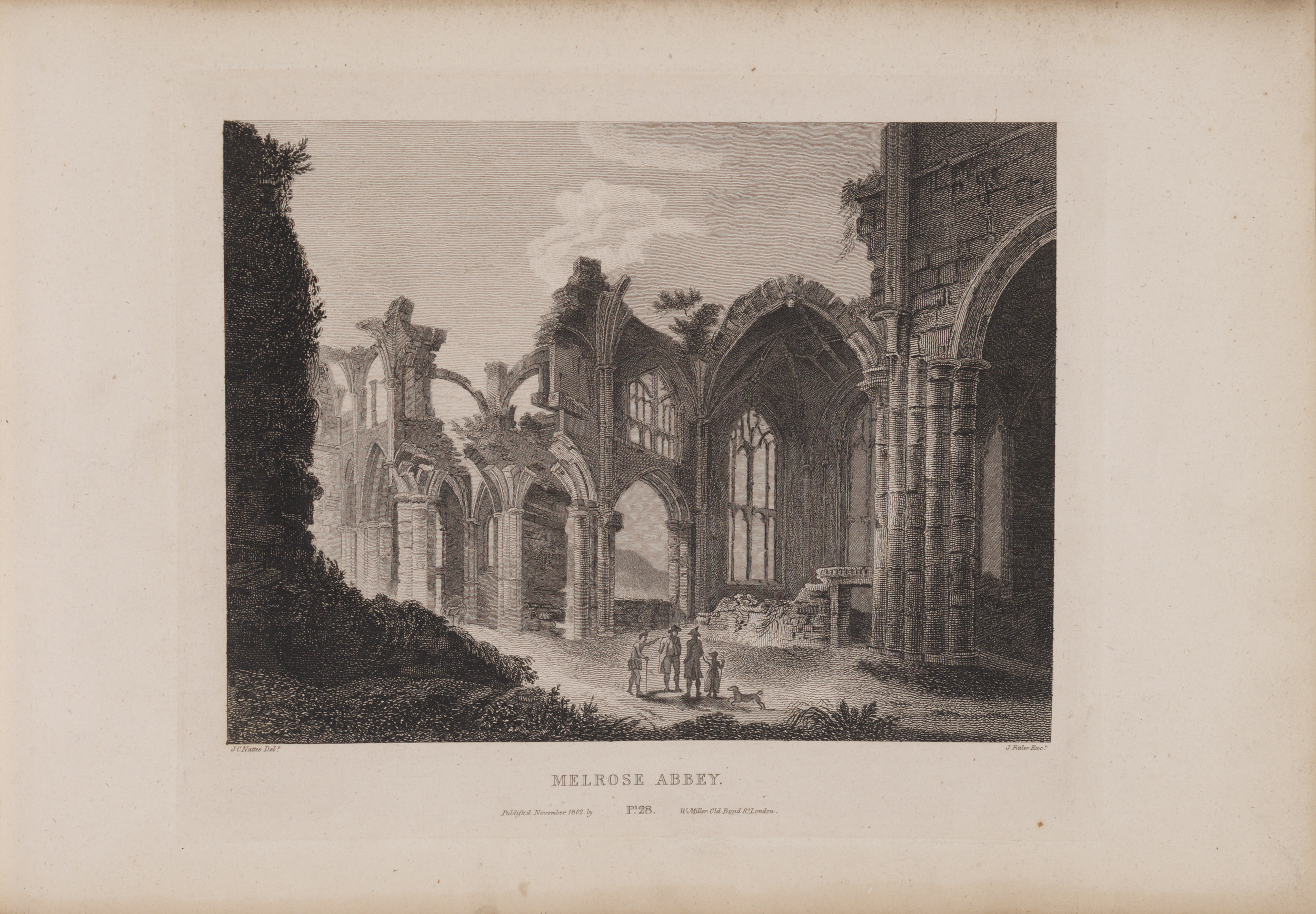
Engraving of the abbey by James Fittler in Scotia Depicta, published in 1804

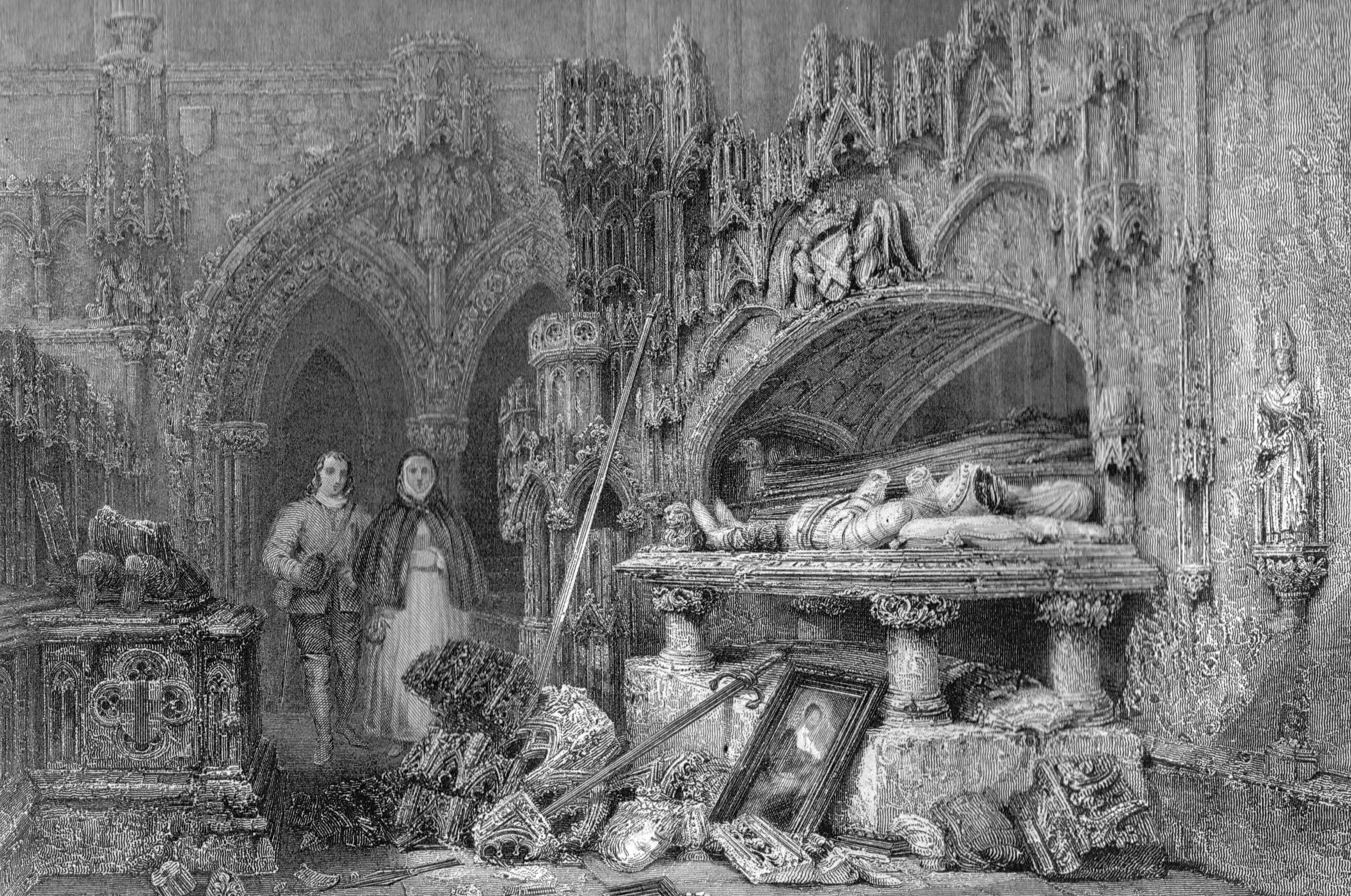
An interior view of the abbey, 1835

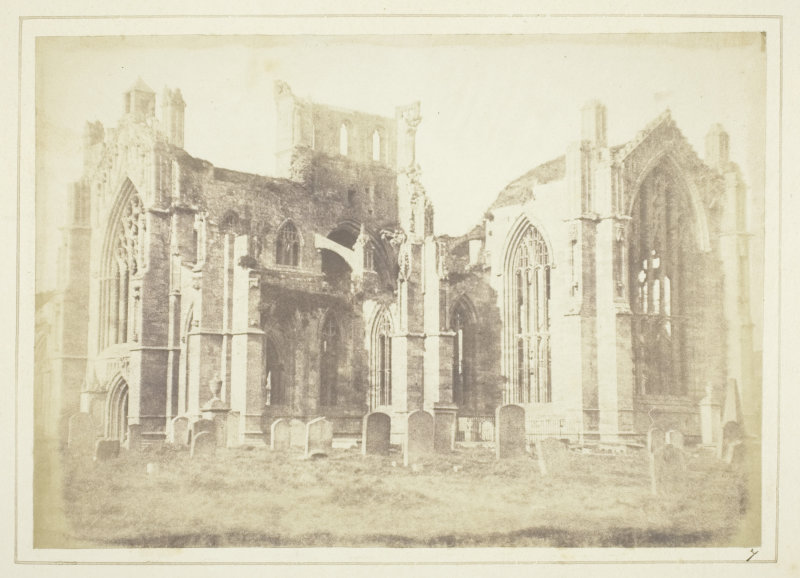
Photograph of Melrose Abbey in 1844, by Henry Fox Talbot

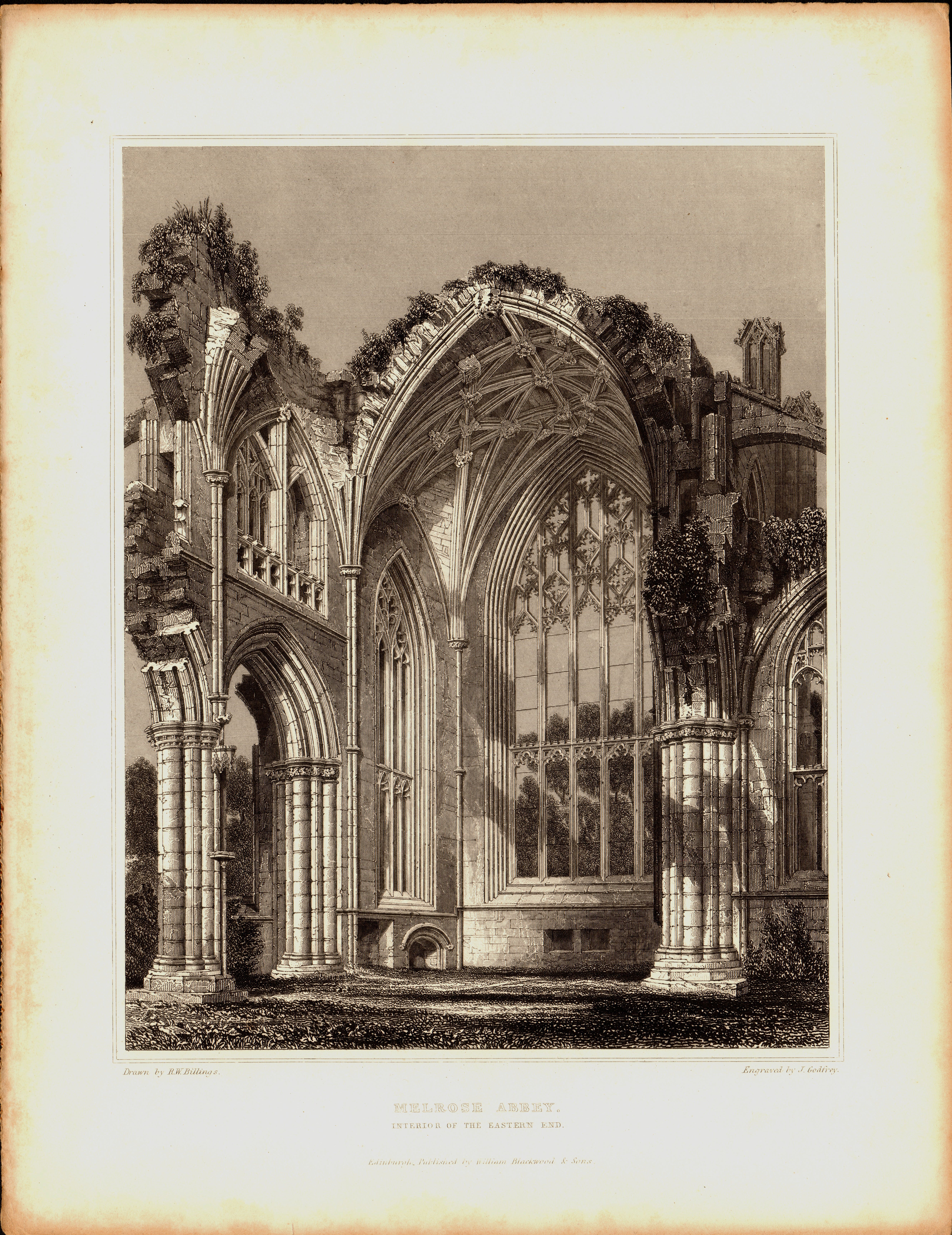
Engraving of the East End of the Abbey from "The Baronial and Ecclesiastical Antiquities of Scotland" (RW Billings, ca 1850)

== Burials ==
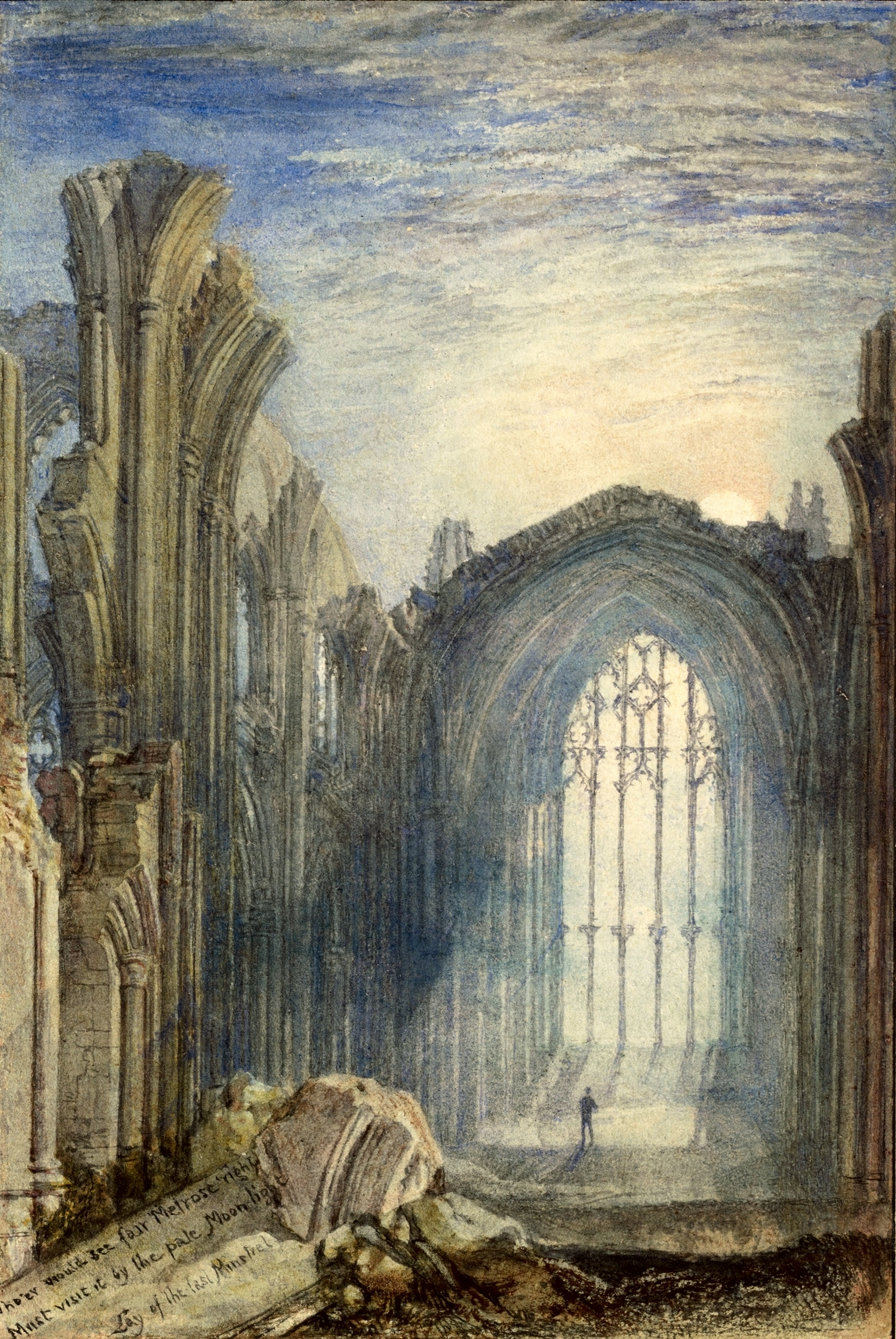
J. M. W. Turner's Melrose Abbey, "If thou wouldst view fair Melrose aright, Go visit it by the pale moonlight;" (Walter Scott)

- Jocelin (Bishop of Glasgow)
- Waltheof of Melrose
- William de Bondington – Bishop of Glasgow
- William Douglas, Lord of Liddesdale
- William Douglas, 1st Earl of Douglas
- James Douglas, 2nd Earl of Douglas
- Philip de Valognes, Chamberlain of Scotland
- Alexander II of Scotland
- Alexander Ormiston Curle
- Sir Brian Layton
- Sir David Brewster (1781–1868), inventor of the Kaleidoscope
- Walter, 8th Duke of Buccleuch
- Mary, Duchess of Buccleuch
- John, 9th Duke of Buccleuch
- Elizabeth, Duchess of Buccleuch

== Tributes ==
Sir Walter Scott described Melrose Abbey in one of his poems, "The Lay of the Last Minstrel, Canto Second".

A Presbyterian congregation in Bloomfield Hills, Michigan, built a Gothic church in the U.S. and patterned it after Melrose Abbey. The church, Kirk in the Hills, completed in 1958, is located on a 40-acre (160,000 m^{2}) lakeside setting 20 miles (32 km) north of Detroit.

The abbey was built in the video game Minecraft by 4J Studios in 2015. The build was featured one of the game's official tutorial worlds (TU31), the one for version 1.8.

== Tourism ==
The abbey is part of five other abbeys and historic sights through Scotland on Borders Abbeys Way walk. In 2019 the site received 61,325 visitors.

A report in February 2023 stated that "conservation work means that the church itself is closed off to visitors, but the cloisters, museum and gardens are still open".

== See also ==
- Abbot of Melrose, for a list of abbots and commendators
- List of religious houses in Scotland
- List of places in the Scottish Borders
- List of places in Scotland
