= William Chisholm =

William Chisholm may refer to:

- William Chisholm (died 1564), bishop of Dunblane
- William Chisholm (died 1593), his nephew, bishop of Dunblane and of Vaison
- William Chisholm (Nova Scotia politician) (1870–1936), Canadian politician who represented Antigonish, Nova Scotia
- William Chisholm (Upper Canada politician) (1788–1842), Upper Canada politician and the founder of Oakville, Ontario
- William A. A. Chisholm, 1823 founder of the Woodville Republican newspaper in Woodville, Mississippi
- Bill Chisholm (businessman), American businessman
- Bill Chisholm (race walker) (1909–1966), American racewalker
