= William Chisholm (died 1593) =

William Chisholm (II)
- Bishop of Dunblane
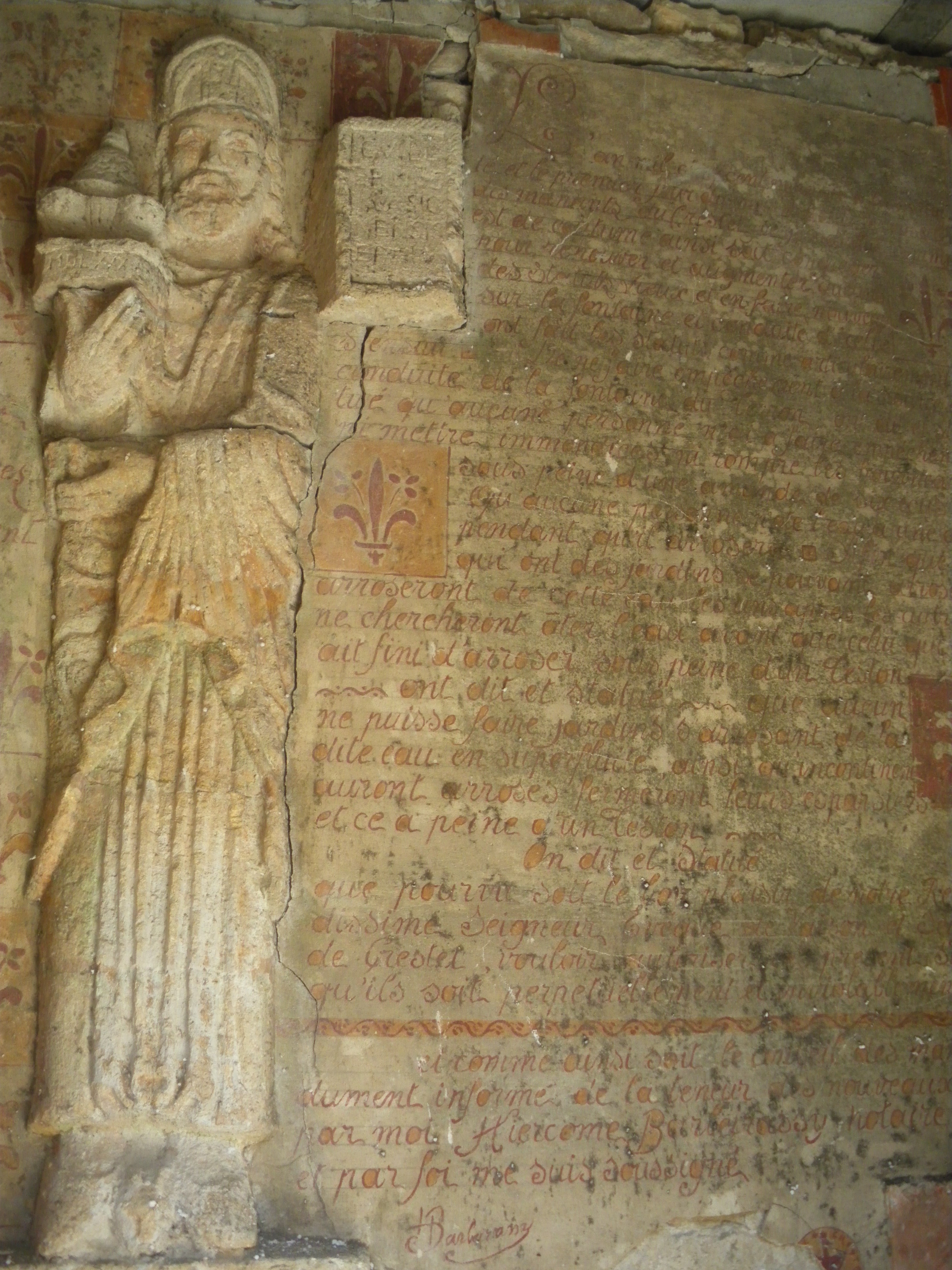
- Statue of William Chisholm at Crestet
- Church: Roman Catholic Church
- Diocese: Dunblane
- In office: 1564–1569
- Predecessor: William Chisholm (I)
- Successor: Andrew Graham
- Other post: Bishop of Vaison (1570–85)
- Previous posts: Coadjutor Bishop of Dunblane (1561–64); Titular Bishop of Massilitan (1561–64)

Personal details
- Born: 1525 x 1526 Scotland
- Died: 26 September 1593 Rome, Papal States

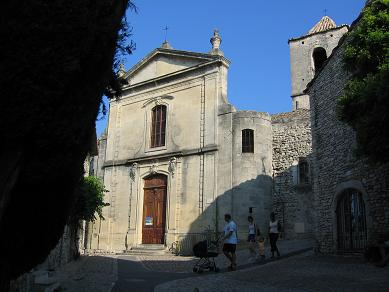
Saint-Quenin cathedral, Vaison-la-Romaine

William Chisholm (called II in some biographies; died 26 September 1593), bishop of Dunblane and bishop of Vaison, was a son of James Chisholm of Cromlix, and nephew to William Chisholm (I), bishop of Dunblane from 1527 to 1564, to whom he was appointed coadjutor by a brief of Pope Pius IV dated 1 June 1561.

== Life ==
He is spoken of by John Knox, who was ordained a Catholic priest by Chisholm, as "one of the chief pillars of the Papisticall Kirk", and in the very highest terms by the pope's legate, Nicolas de Gouda, in his despatch from the Scottish court in 1562. The legate, after commenting on the incapacity of the Scottish bishops generally, goes on to say: "The only exception is the coadjutor bishop of Dunblane; though holding but a secondary position during the lifetime of his superior, he has already made his influence felt, both in public and in private, having succeeded in confirming a great many people in the faith, and being justly held in high esteem and regard by all good men".

This bishop was much employed by Mary, Queen of Scots, in diplomatic missions, of which the most important were in 1565 to Rome to obtain the pope's dispensation for her marriage with Lord Darnley in spite of their consanguinity, and in 1567, when she sent him as special envoy to France to convey the intelligence of her marriage with Lord Bothwell, and to explain the circumstances attending that event.

He was also one of the commissioners for the divorce of Bothwell and Lady Jane Gordon, daughter of George Gordon, 4th Earl of Huntly. He is said to have still further dilapidated the income of his bishopric, and was declared to have forfeited it for non-compliance with the legislation passed by the Scottish Reformation Parliament after the overthrow and exile of the Queen. In exile in Rome in January 1569, he was appointed as a priest at the Basilica di Santa Maria Maggiore by Carlo Cardinal Borromeo, Lord Archbishop of Milan. On 3 July 1573 a license was issued by the four regents for the choice of successor as Bishop of Dunblane.

Chisholm had before this retired to France, where he was well known, and in 1570 he was instituted by the pope to the bishopric of Vaison-la-Romaine, near Avignon, as some recompense for the loss of his Diocese in Scotland and his exile. This bishopric, however, he resigned in 1584 in favour of his nephew, William Chisholm (III), when he retired to the convent of Grande Chartreuse. He took the vows only of a simple monk, but was soon made prior of the Chartreuse at Lyon, and eventually at Rome. He continued to busy himself greatly with trying to preserve the Catholic Church in Scotland until his death at Rome on 26 September 1593, and is buried in the church of the Carthusians there.

== Notes ==
Attribution

This article incorporates text from a publication now in the public domain: Stephens, Henry Morse (1887). "Chisholm, William (d.1593)". In Stephen, Leslie (ed.). Dictionary of National Biography. Vol. 10. London: Smith, Elder & Co. p. 262.

Religious titles
Preceded by William Chisholm (I)	Bishop of Dunblane; 1564–1569	Succeeded by Andrew Graham
