= Seille =

Seille may refer to several rivers in France:

- Seille (Moselle), in Lorraine, tributary of the Moselle
- Seille (Saône), in Franche-Comté and Burgundy, tributary of the Saône
- Seille (Ouvèze), in Provence, tributary of the Ouvèze

== See also ==
- Seilles, a village in the Belgian municipality Andenne
