= François Genet =

Most Reverend François Genet
- Bishop of Vaison
- Church: Catholic Church
- Diocese: Diocese of Vaison
- In office: 1686–1702
- Predecessor: Louis-Alphonse de Suarès
- Successor: Joseph-François Gualtieri

Orders
- Ordination: 19 December 1665
- Consecration: 25 March 1686 by Alessandro Crescenzi

Personal details
- Born: 16 October 1640 Avignon, France
- Died: 17 October 1702 (age 62) Vaison, France

François Genet (1640–1702) was a Roman Catholic prelate who served as Bishop of Vaison (1686–1702).

== Biography ==
François Genet was born in Avignon, France, on 16 October 1640. He was ordained a deacon on 19 September 1665 and ordained a priest on 19 December 1665. On 18 March 1686, he was appointed during the papacy of Pope Innocent XI as Bishop of Vaison. On 25 March 1686, he was consecrated bishop by Alessandro Crescenzi, Cardinal-Priest of Santa Prisca, with Giuseppe Eusanio, Titular Bishop of Porphyreon, and Pier Antonio Capobianco, Bishop Emeritus of Lacedonia, serving as co-consecrators. He served as Bishop of Vaison until his death on 17 October 1702.

Catholic Church titles
Preceded by Louis-Alphonse de Suarès	Bishop of Vaison; 1686–1702	Succeeded by Joseph-François Gualtieri
