= Boerio =

Boerio is a surname. Notable people with the surname include:

- Bibiana Boerio (born 1954), American businesswoman
- Chuck Boerio (1930–2011), American football player
- Henri Boério (born 1952), French gymnast

== See also ==
- Boeri
