= Roman Catholic Diocese of Vaison =

French diocese

Diocese of Vaison Dioecesis Vasensis
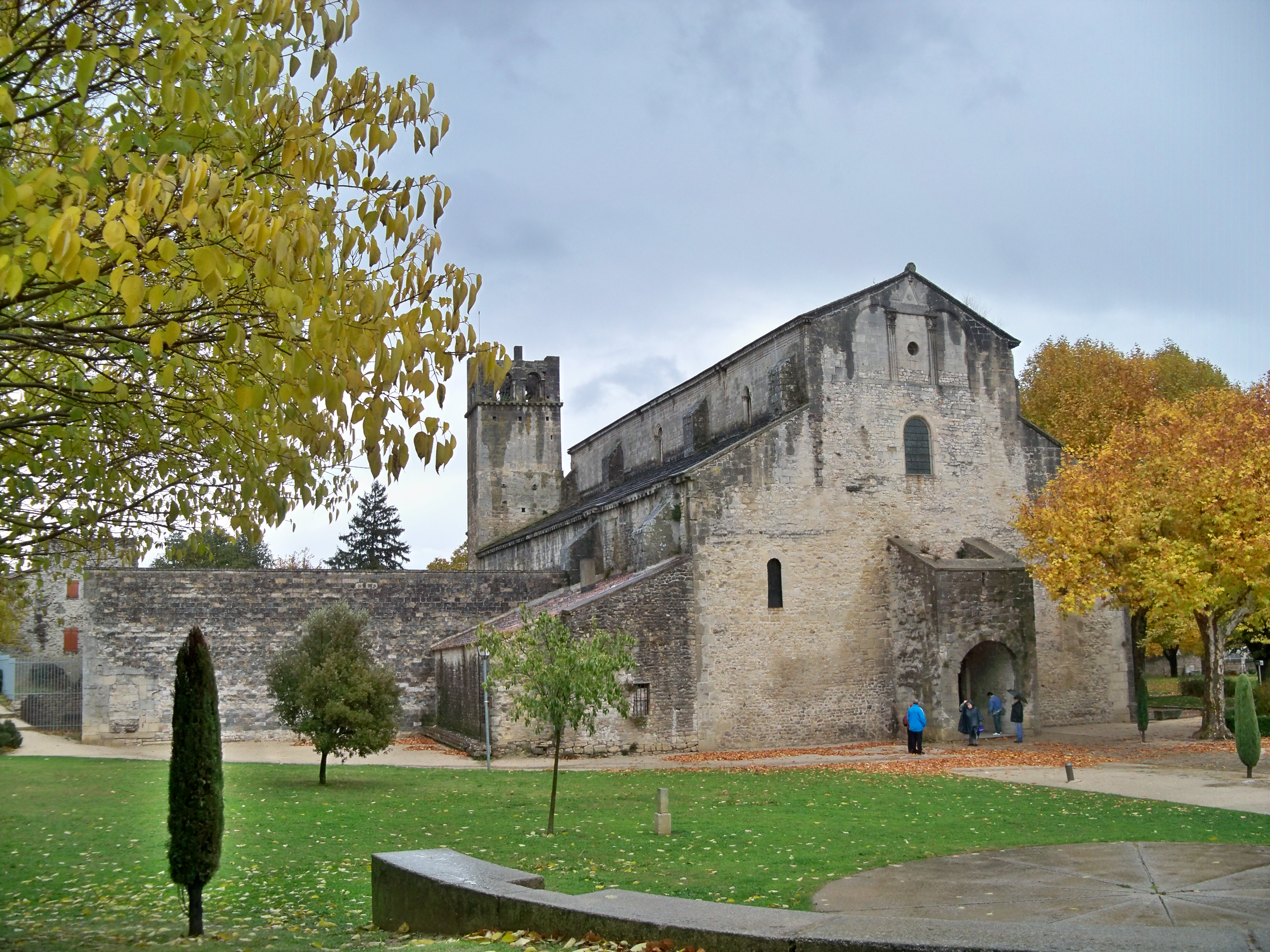
- Cathedral of Notre Dame, Vaison

Location
- Country: France
- Ecclesiastical province: Archdiocese of Avignon
- Coordinates: 44.24°N 5.07°E

Information
- Established: 4th century (suppressed in 1801)
- Cathedral: Cathedral of Notre Dame, Vaison

The Diocese of Vaison (Latin: dioecesis Vasionensis) was a Roman Catholic diocese in France, suppressed in 1801, with its territory transferred to the Diocese of Avignon. It had been one of nine dioceses in the ecclesiastical province presided over by the archbishop of Arles, but a later reorganization placed Vasio, i.e. today's Vaison-la-Romaine, under the archbishop of Avignon. Jurisdiction inside the diocese was shared between the bishop and the Comte de Provence (Count of Provence), higher justice and the castle belonging to the Comte, and civil justice and all other rights belonging to the bishop. The cathedral was served by a chapter which had four dignities: the provost (praepositus), the archdeacon, the sacristan, and the precentor. There were also six canons, each of whom had a prebend attached to his office.

== History ==
The oldest known bishop of the See is Daphnus, who assisted at the Council of Arles (314).

Others were St. Quinidius (Quenin, 556–579), who resisted the claims of the patrician Mummolus, conqueror of the Lombards; Joseph-Marie de Suares (1633–1666), who died in Rome in 1677 while filling the office of Custode of the Vatican Library and Vicar of the Basilica of St. Peter, and who left numerous works.

St. Rusticala (551–628) was abbess of the monastery of St. Caesarius at Arles.

William Chisholme (II), former bishop of Dunblane, became bishop of Vaison-la-Romaine in 1566 or 1569.

Two councils which dealt with ecclesiastical discipline were held at Vaison in 442 and 529, the latter a provincial council under the presidency of Caesarius of Arles.

The bishopric was suppressed as part of the Napoleonic Concordat of 1801, between Consul Bonaparte and Pope Pius VII, and the territory of Vaison was incorporated into the diocese of Avignon and the diocese of Valence. In 2009 the title of Vasio was revived as a titular See.

== Bishops ==
=== To 1000 ===
- Dafnus (Daphnus, Dammas) 314–347
- Emilien 347–367
- Concordius 367–419
- Julian 419–439
- Auspicius 439–450
- Fonteïus 450–483
- Donidius 483–506
- Papolus 506–511
- Etilius 511–517
- Gemellus 517–524
- Eripius 524
- Alethius 524–541
- Theodosius 541–556
- Saint Quenin 556–575
- Saint Barse 575–581
- Artemius 581–644?
- Pétronius Aredius 644
- Vacant for 169 years
- Jean I 813–853
- Simplicius 853–855
- Elias (Hélie) 855–911
- Umbert I 911–933
- Ripert I 933–982
- Amalric I 982–983
- Umbert II 983–996
- Benedictus (Benoît I) 996–1003 or 1000

=== 1000 to 1300 ===
- Imbert 1000?–1003?
- Almerade 1003–1005
- Umbert III 1005–1007
- Pierre I 1007–1009
- Pierre de Mirabel 1009–1059
- Benoît II 1059–1060
- Pierre III 1060–1103
- Raimbaud I 1103–1107
- Rostang 1107–1142
- Bérenger de Mornas 1142–1178
- Bertrand de Lambesc 1178–1185
- Bérenger de Reilhane 1185–1190
- Guillaume de Laudun 1190–1193
- Raimbaud de Flotte 1193–1212
- Ripert de Flotte 1212–1241
- Guy I 1241–1250
- Faraud 1250–1271
- Giraud de Libra 1271–1279
- Bertrand II 1279–1280
- Giraud II 1280–1296
- Raimond de Beaumont 1296–1332

=== 1300 to 1500 ===
- Jean II 1332–1333
- Bertrand III 1333–1335
- Gocio (Gozzio, Gothius) de Bataille 1335–1336, cardinal
- Ratier 1336–1341
- Pierre de Casa Patriarche 1341–1348
- Pierre de Beret 1348–1356
- Guy de Perpignan
- Laurent d'Albiac 1356–1362
- Jean Maurel 1362–1370
- Pierre Boyer 1370–1376
- Eblon de Meder 1376–1380
- Raimond de Bonne (Dominican) 1380–1395
- Radulph 1395–1406
- Guillaume de Pesserat 1406–1412
- Hugues de Theissiac 1409–1445
- Pons de Sade 1445–1473
- Jean de Montmirail 1473–1479
- Amauric II 1479–1482
- Odon Alziassi 1482–1483
- Roland 1483–1485
- Benoit de Paganottis, O.P. 1485–1523

=== From 1500 ===
- Jérôme Sclede 1523–1533
- Thomas Cortés 1533–1544
- Jacques Cortès Patriarche 1544–1566
- William Chisholm (II) 1566–1585
- William Chisholm (III) 1585–1629 (nephew of the preceding)
- Michel d'Almeras 1629–1633
- Joseph Marie de Suarès 1633–1666
- Charles Joseph de Suarès 1666–1671
- Louis Alphonse de Suarès 1671–1685
- François Genet 1685–1703
- Joseph François Gualtéri 1703–1725
- Joseph Louis de Cohorne de la Palun 1725–1748
- Paul de Sallières de Fausseran 1748–1758
- Charles François de Pélissier de St Ferréol 1758–1786
- Etienne André Fallot de Beaumont 1786–1790

== See also ==
- Catholic Church in France
- List of Catholic dioceses in France

== Bibliography ==
=== Reference works ===
- Gams, Pius Bonifatius (1873). Series episcoporum Ecclesiae catholicae: quotquot innotuerunt a beato Petro apostolo. Ratisbon: Typis et Sumptibus Georgii Josephi Manz. p. 517.
- Eubel, Conradus, ed. (1913). Hierarchia catholica, Tomus 1 (in Latin) (second ed.). Münster: Libreria Regensbergiana. p. 263.
- Eubel, Conradus, ed. (1914). Hierarchia catholica, Tomus 2 (in Latin) (second ed.). Münster: Libreria Regensbergiana. p. 244.
- Gauchat, Patritius (Patrice) (1935). Hierarchia catholica IV (1592-1667). Münster: Libraria Regensbergiana. p. 360.
- Gulik, Guilelmus (1923). Eubel, Conradus (ed.). Hierarchia catholica, Tomus 3 (second ed.). Münster: Libreria Regensbergiana. p. 327.
- Ritzler, Remigius; Sefrin, Pirminus (1952). Hierarchia catholica medii et recentis aevi V (1667-1730). Patavii: Messagero di S. Antonio. pp. 405–406.
- Ritzler, Remigius; Sefrin, Pirminus (1958). Hierarchia catholica medii et recentis aevi VI (1730-1799). Patavii: Messagero di S. Antonio. p. 433.
- Sainte-Marthe, Denis de (1715). Gallia christiana, in provincias ecclesiasticas distributa (in Latin). Vol. Tomus primus. Paris: Coignard. pp. 919–940.

=== Studies ===
- Boyer, Louis-Anselme (1731). Histoire de l'église cathédrale de Vaison, avec une chronologie de tous les évêques qui l'ont gouvernée et une chorographie ou description en vers latins et français des villes, bourgs, villages... (in French). Vol. 2 volumes. Avignon: Chave.
- Duchesne, Louis (1907). Fastes épiscopaux de l'ancienne Gaule: I. Provinces du Sud-Est (in French) (2nd ed.). Paris: Fontemoing. pp. 262–263.
- Labande, Léon-Honoré (1905). La cathédrale de Vaison: étude historique et archéologique (in French). Caen: H. Delesques.
- Sautel, Joseph (1926). Vaison dans l'Antiquité (in French). Vol. 3 vols and Supplement. Avignon: Aubanel-Rullière.
