= Alice Colonieu =

French ceramicist, painter and sculptor (1924–2010)

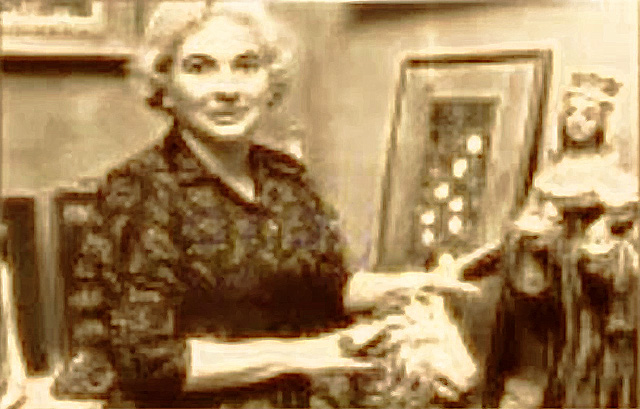
- Born: 5 November 1924; Marseille, France
- Died: 16 July 2010 (aged 85); Roaix, Vaucluse
- Known for: Sculpting, painting

Alice Victorine Antoinette Colonieu (5 November 1924 – 16 July 2010) was a French ceramicist, painter and sculptor.

== Biography ==
From an old family from Vaucluse, Alice Colonieu was born in Marseille, the daughter of Albert, a SNCF controller, and Cephyse Jouve. After leaving the École des Beaux-Arts of Marseille where she received several first and second prize during the war. Alice Colonieu follows the course of the vocational school ceramic Fontcarrade in Montpellier, then settled near Orange. From the year 1945 until the 1980s, Alice Colonieu expresses her talent with the clay as an expression.

Alice Colonieu exhibit at the Decorative Arts in 1953 and 1954. In 1953 she became a member of the Federation of Crafts. She presented her ceramics at the exhibition of masterpieces of modern ceramic at Cannes in 1955. Then in 1961, Alice Colonieu won the gold medal at the National Exhibition of Arts.

Alice Colonieu worked for major designers such as Jean Royère, Maurice Rinck and Jules Leleu whom she performed two beautiful ceramic panels for the Ocean liner Pierre Loti. But she is also interested in the decoration of public buildings such as the postal office of Isle sur la Sorgue, the school Frédéric Mistral at Avignon or even churches Roaix, Sablet and Valréas. Her works were exhibited at the Musée National d'Art Moderne of Paris, the International Museum of Ceramics in Faenza and in major international collections

In 1960 Alice Colonieu moved to Roaix in Vaucluse, where she built a house. She explored painting and book illustration. A local legend says that the penitents asked to Alice Colonieu to make a statue of the Virgin and to install on the back of a house in Villedieu. This set of Renaissance style, decorated with a king scallop is called the " Virgin of the Smile" and is still visible in Villedieu.

In 1997 Alice Colonieu illustrated book of René Lachaud entitled Templiers : Chevaliers d'Orient et d'Occident.

She died on 16 July 2010 at her home in Roaix.

In 2012, an exhibition of 1950's ceramicists took place at the Museum of Mediterranean pottery featured Alice Colonieu's pieces.

In September 2013, during the Marseille Provence 2013, in the rooms of the Hotel de Manville in Baux-de-Provence, the first exhibition of ceramics and glass by Alice Colonieu and Jean-Paul Van Lith was held. During this event, Sylvie Caron, curator of the exhibition Marseille-Provence 2013, paid tribute to Alice Colonieu, exposing parts that have never been shown before including service personnel dishes or even jewelry the artist had made for herself.

At Vaison-la-Romaine, a street was named Impasse Alice Colonieu. She died in Roaix, Vaucluse.
