= Andrew Graham (bishop of Dunblane) =

Andrew Graham was Bishop of Dunblane between 1573 and 1594.

== Life ==
He was the grandson of William Graham, 2nd Earl of Montrose and was sometime minister of Wick, Caithness.

He received license for election after the deprivation of William Chisholm (II) on 3 July 1573, with crown confirmation and mandate for consecration on 17 May 1575. He was granted the temporalities of the bishopric on 28 July 1575. In July 1594 he was deposed due to lack of residency and failing in his duties for at least seven years.

He was not formally replaced until 1603, making way for his kinsman George Graham. His episcopate fell in a time when the role of bishops had been reduced to little more than nominal function.

== Family ==
He married Jane Bisset, daughter of Walter Bisset of Easter Kinneff (on the coast north of Montrose).
