= Boeri =

Boeri or Boéri is a surname. Notable people with the surname include:

- Cini Boeri (1924–2020), Italian architect and designer
- Daniel Boéri (born 1944), Monegasque sociologist and politician
- Isabelle Boéri-Bégard (born 1960), French fencer
- Michel Boeri, Monegasque motor sports manager
- Petrus Boeri (14th century), Benedictive bishop
- Stefano Boeri (born 1956), Italian architect and urban planner
- Tito Boeri (born 1958), Italian economist and academic
