= Vgo (stonemason) =

Twelfth-century stonemason

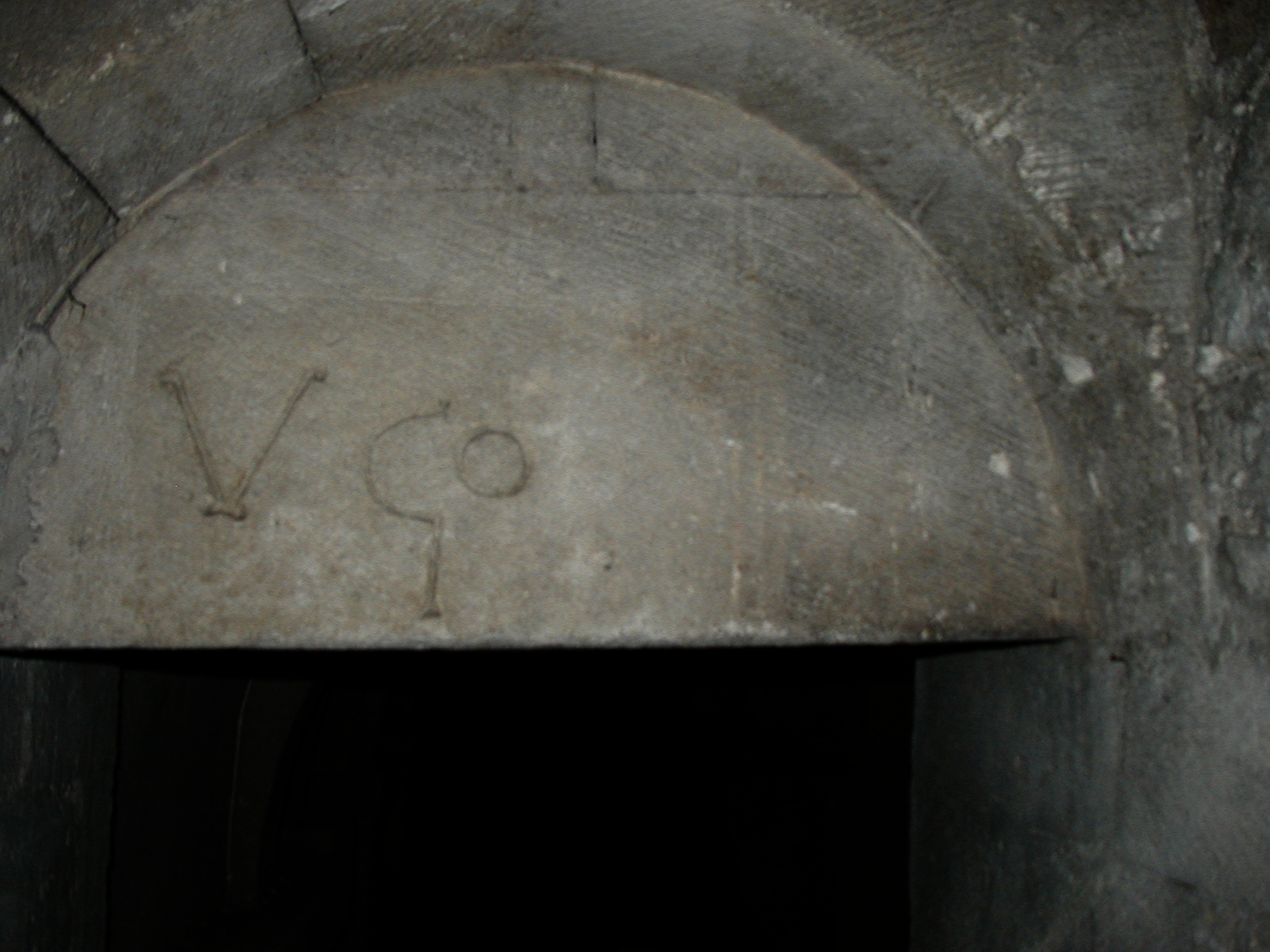
Vgo signature with sickle-shaped G inside Apt Crypt

Vgo, or Ugo, for "Hugues", was a stonemason active in Provence during the twelfth century. He left his signature on several Romanesque religious edifices in Provence and mainly in Tricastin:

- Vaison Cathedral
- Notre Dame d'Aubune
- St Blaise de Bauzon
- St Sepulchre Chapel in Beaumont
- Crypt of Apt Cathedral

He is not to be confused with Master Hugo, an English artist of the same century.
