= Montauban-sur-l'Ouvèze =

- Commune
- Coat of arms
- Location of Montauban-sur-l'Ouvèze
- Location within France Location within Auvergne-Rhône-Alpes
- Coordinates: 44°16′00″N 5°30′00″E
- Country: France
- Region: Auvergne-Rhône-Alpes
- Department: Drôme
- Arrondissement: Nyons
- Canton: Nyons et Baronnies

Government
  - Mayor (2020–2026): Gérard Coupon
- Area^{1}: 32.29 km^{2} (12.47 sq mi)
- Highest elevation: 1,532 m (5,026 ft)
- Lowest elevation: 665 m (2,182 ft)
- Population (2023): 116
  - Density: 3.59/km^{2} (9.30/sq mi)
- Time zone: UTC+01:00 (CET)
  - Summer (DST): UTC+02:00 (CEST)
- INSEE/Postal code: 26189 /26170
- ^{1} French Land Register data, which excludes lakes, ponds, glaciers > 1 km^{2} (0.386 sq mi or 247 acres) and river estuaries.

Montauban-sur-l'Ouvèze (French pronunciation: [mɔ̃tobɑ̃ syʁ luvɛz], literally Montauban on the Ouvèze; Vivaro-Alpine: Montauban d'Ovèsa) is a commune in the Drôme department in southeastern France.

== Population ==
Historical population
Year	Pop.	±% p.a.
1968	140	—
1975	92	−5.82%
1982	80	−1.98%
1990	81	+0.16%
1999	85	+0.54%
2007	121	+4.51%
2012	102	−3.36%
2017	110	+1.52%
2023	116	+0.89%
Source: INSEE

== See also ==
- Communes of the Drôme department
