= Jules Leleu =

French furniture designer

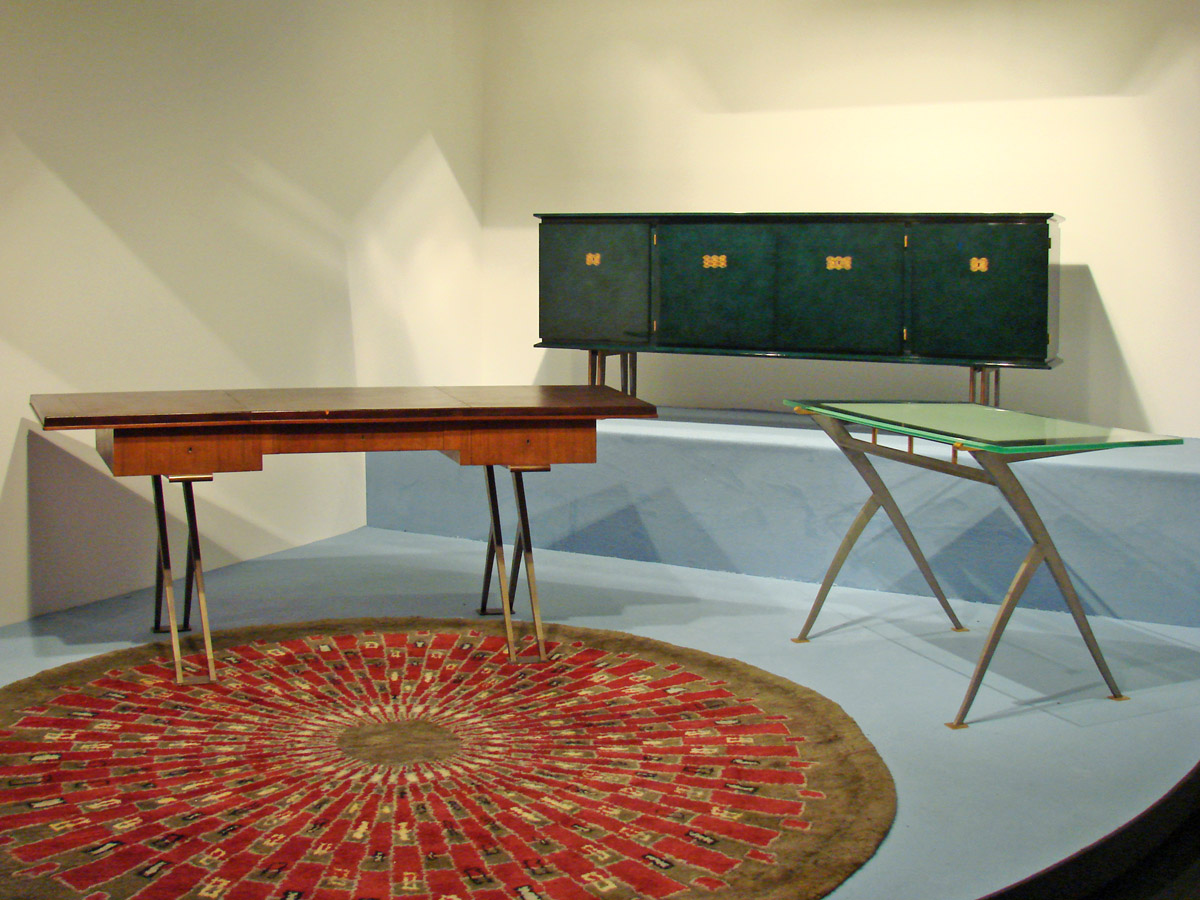

Jules Leleu (June 17, 1883 – 1961), was a French furniture designer.

== Career ==
Born in Boulogne-sur-Mer, France, Leleu studied decorative painting and at the age of 26 succeeded his father in the family painting business. With his brother he began work in the Decorating field. After World War I, Leleu specialized in furniture making. He opened a Paris gallery, Maison Leleu, in 1924 and exhibited at the 1925 Exposition Industrielle et Arts Decoratifs, winning a grand prize at the exposition. Leleu designed the Grand Salon of the Ambassadors at the Society of Nations in Geneva and the French Embassies of several nations as well as the ocean liners SS Ile de France and SS Normandie. Jules Leleu worked with Alice Colonieu, she performed for Jules leleu two beautiful ceramic panels for the Ocean liner Pierre Loti. Leleu often implemented lacquer in his work. Before World War II he worked with Japanese lacquer master Katsu Hamanaka and after the War with Paul-Etienne Sain and Henri Tambute.
