= Roman Bridge (Vaison-la-Romaine) =

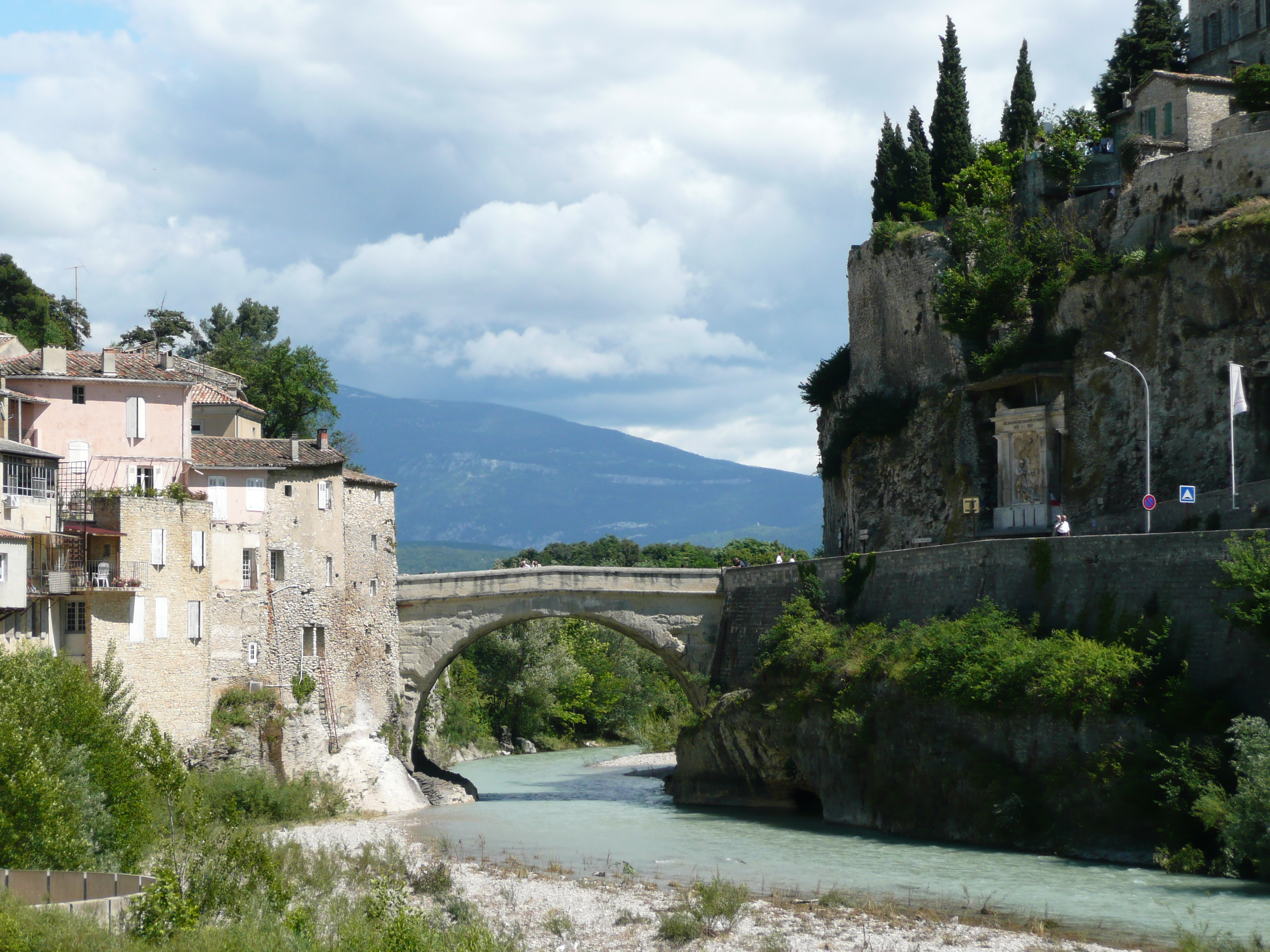
- Roman bridge in Vaison la Romaine, France
- Coordinates: 44.238957°N 5.074689°E
- Crosses: Ouvèze
- Locale: Vaison-la-Romaine, Vaucluse, France

Characteristics
- Design: Arch bridge
- Material: Stone
- Width: 9 m
- Longest span: 17.20 m
- No. of spans: 1

History
- Construction end: 1st century AD

Location
- Interactive map of Roman Bridge

The Roman Bridge at Vaison-la-Romaine (French: Pont romain de Vaison-la-Romaine) is a Roman bridge over the river Ouvèze in the southern French town of Vaison-la-Romaine. The bridge was built by the Romans in the 1st century AD, with a single arch spanning 17.20 m. It is still in use, and has survived severe flooding that swept away some more recent bridges.

== See also ==
- List of bridges in France
- List of Roman bridges
- Roman architecture
- Roman engineering

== Sources ==
- O’Connor, Colin (1993), Roman Bridges, Cambridge University Press, p. 99 (G15), ISBN 0-521-39326-4
