= Provençal markets =

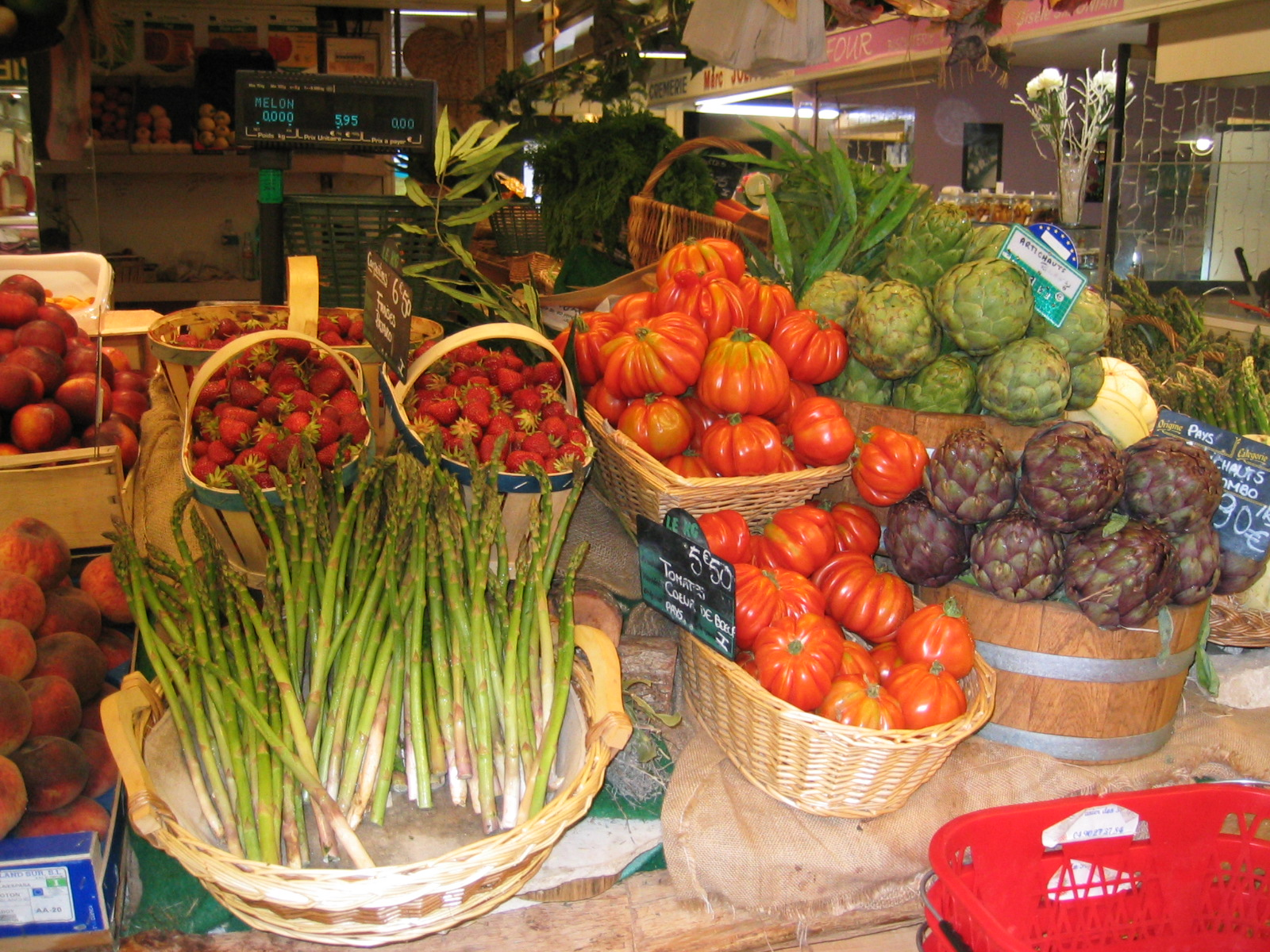
Local produce for sale in Avignon

Provençal markets (Occitan: mercats Provençals) or markets of Provence (mercats de Provença) have become one of the regional emblems of Provence-Alpes-Côte d'Azur. Traditional markets held in a town or village are events that are both a celebration of local identity, and a collective ceremony in which everyone is both the participant and spectator, as well as a meeting place where everyone is equal and no one is excluded. Some markets date back to the Middle Ages. For example, Vaison-la-Romaine's market was authorized by Pope Sixtus IV in 1483.

== Tourism and tradition ==
Very often, the traditional markets occupied squares and little streets and their main goal was to channel the provision of food supplies in towns and villages and to keep informed as well.

With the rise of mass tourism during the 20th century the festival of colours and smells provided by the local fruits and vegetables, as well as spices and Herbes de Provence, itself became an attraction.

== Summer season ==
In the summer, the traditional holiday period, one will find tomatoes, peppers, lettuces, black and green olives, onions, apricots, peaches, figs, grapes, etc., not to forget local produce such as the Cavaillon melon, candied fruits from Apt, calissons from Aix, nougat from Sault, strawberries from Carpentras or fish from the coasts.

The Provençal market also offers local specialities such as essential oils of lavender from Haute-Provence, cut and dried flowers, and all kinds of soap products. Finally, it is also the chance to discover truffles, lavender honey, cordials, jams, olives, designation of origin oils and fine wines from the Rhone Valley and Provence.

== Bibliography ==
- Dixon and Ruthanne Long, Markets of Provence: A Culinary Tour of Southern France (1996)
- Marjorie R. Williams, Markets of Provence: Food, Antiques, Crafts, and More (2016)
