= George Graham (bishop) =

George Graeme (1565–1643), Bishop of Dunblane and Bishop of Orkney, was a late sixteenth- and early seventeenth century Church of Scotland prelate.

== Life ==
He was the younger son of George Grahame Laird of Inchbraikie and his wife, Marion ("Mary") Rollo, daughter of Rollo of Duncrub. He was a great-grandson of William Graham, 1st Earl of Montrose.

Originally (from 1589) minister of Clunie he translated to Auchtergaven in 1595 and further translated to Scone in 1601, and then in February 1603, he received crown provision to the bishopric of Dunblane, vacant by the resignation of Andrew Graham. George had to wait a few years to obtain consecration, but was consecrated at some date between 21 October 1610 and 3 May 1611.

On 26 August 1615, he was translated to the bishopric of Orkney. He held that bishopric for more than three decades. Graeme, along with all other bishops of Scotland, was deprived of his see on 18 November 1638. He renounced his rights to the bishopric a few months later, on 11 February 1639, after being threatened by the Assembly at Glasgow. By this action, he avoided excommunication, and retained his estate at Gorthie. He died on 19 December 1643.

== Family ==
In 1595, he married Marion Crichton, sister of The Admirable James Crichton. Marion was the daughter of Sir Robert Crichton of Eliock and Cluny, Perthshire, Lord Advocate of Scotland, and his wife Elizabeth Stewart, granddaughter of Andrew Stewart, 2nd Lord Avondale. They were the parents of at least seven children, five of whom survived to adulthood.

Religious titles
Preceded by Andrew Graham	Bishop of Dunblane; 1603–1615	Succeeded by Adam Bellenden
Preceded by James Law	Bishop of Orkney; 1615–1638	Vacant Title next held by Thomas Sydserf
