= Ouvèze =

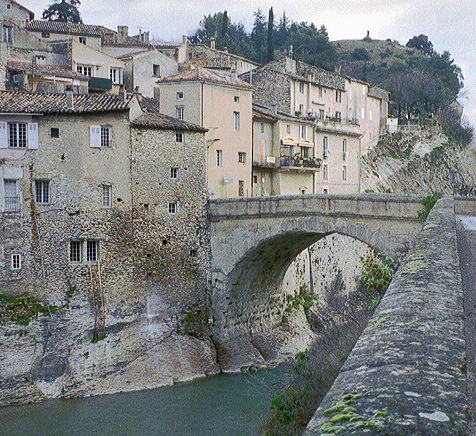
- Roman bridge over the Ouvèze in Vaison-la-Romaine.

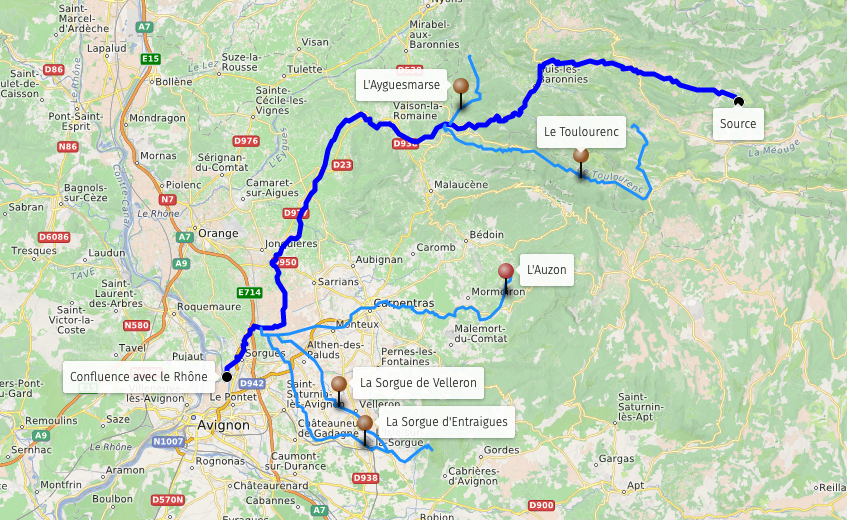

Location
- Country: France

Physical characteristics
- Source
  - location: French Prealps
  - elevation: 830 m (2,720 ft)
- Mouth
  - location: Rhône
  - coordinates: 43°59′23″N 4°51′9″E
- Length: 93 km (58 mi)
- Basin size: 1,919 km^{2} (741 sq mi)

Basin features
- Progression: Rhône→ Mediterranean Sea

The Ouvèze (French pronunciation: [uvɛz]; Occitan: Ovesa) is a river in southern France and left tributary of the Rhône. It rises in the southern French Prealps (the Baronnies), in the commune of Montauban-sur-l'Ouvèze. It flows into the Rhône in Sorgues, north of Avignon. Its length is 93 km (58 mi). Its drainage basin is 1,919 km^{2} (741 sq mi). The Sorgue is one of its tributaries.

The Ouvèze passes through the following départements and towns:

- Drôme: Buis-les-Baronnies, Mollans-sur-Ouvèze
- Vaucluse: Vaison-la-Romaine, Bédarrides, Sorgues
