= William Chisholm (died 1564) =

British divine and bishop of Dunblane

- Bishop of Dunblane
- Church: Roman Catholic Church
- Diocese: Dunblane
- In office: 1526–1564
- Predecessor: James Chisholm
- Successor: William Chisholm

Orders
- Consecration: 14 April 1527 by Gavin Dunbar

Personal details
- Born: c. 1498
- Died: December 1564 (aged c. 66)

William Chisholm (called I in some biographies; c. 1498 – December 1564) was a Scottish divine, and Bishop of Dunblane.

== Life ==
He was the second son of Edmund Chisholm of Cromlix, near Dunblane, a son of Chisholm of that ilk in Roxburghshire, and half-brother of James Chisholm, who was bishop of Dunblane from 1486 to 1527, when he resigned his see, with the consent of Pope Clement VII and King James V, in favour of his nephew William Chisholm (died 1593).

William Chisholm was consecrated bishop at Stirling on 14 April 1527, but James continued to administer the affairs and receive the income of the see until his death in 1534. Chisholm seems to have been a man of immoral character, and a nepotist, for, being an adversary of the Reformation, he alienated nearly all the property of the bishopric of Dunblane to his relations.

Most of it he gave to his nephew, Sir James Chisholm of Cromlix; and large portions also to his illegitimate son, James Chisholm of Glassengall, who married Joan, daughter of Sir John Drummond of Innerpeffray, and to his two illegitimate daughters, who were married respectively to Sir James Stirling of Keir and to John Buchanan of that ilk. His daughter Jean, who married Sir James Stirling of Keir, is said in an old genealogy of the Drummonds, quoted by Fraser in his "Stirlings of Keir", to have been the daughter of the bishop by Lady Jean Grahame, daughter of the Earl of Montrose, and in the same book are contained many grants of land from the bishop to this daughter and her husband.

One of the Lords of the Congregation, the Earl of Arran, looted the Bishop's palace and carried him and his valuables to Stirling Castle on 9 November 1559.

He died on 14 or 15 December 1564 and was succeeded in the bishopric of Dunblane by his nephew, William Chisholm (died 1593) of the family of Cromlix, who had been appointed his coadjutor in 1561.

== Sources ==
- Keith, Robert, An Historical Catalogue of the Scottish Bishops: Down to the Year 1688, (London, 1824), pp. 179–80

Religious titles
Preceded by James Chisholm	Bishops of Dunblane; 1526–1564	Succeeded by William Chisholm (II)
