= James Chisholm (bishop) =

- Bishop of Dunblane
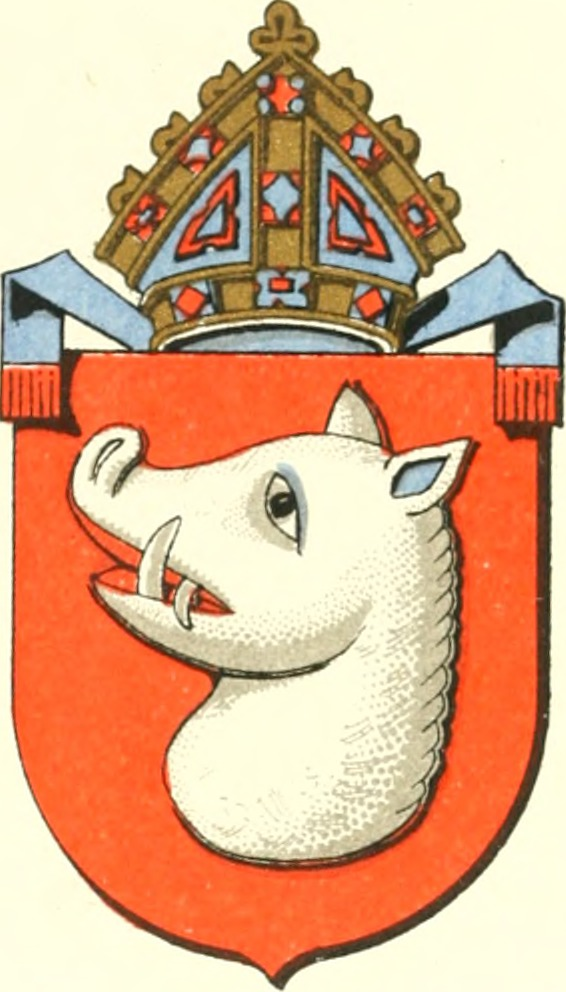
- Coat of arms of James Chisholm
- Church: Roman Catholic Church
- See: Diocese of Dunblane
- In office: 1487–1526
- Predecessor: John Herspolz
- Successor: William Chisholm (I)
- Previous post: Dean of Aberdeen (1482–1487)

Orders
- Consecration: 11 July 1487 x 28 January 1488

Personal details
- Born: 15th century Scotland
- Died: c. 1545 Probably Scotland

James Chisholm (died c. 1545), Bishop of Dunblane, was the eldest son of Edmund Chisholm, the first Chisholm to own the estate of Cromlix in Dunblane parish, Strathearn, having moved from the Scottish Borders. In his early years as a clergyman, he was a chaplain to King James III of Scotland; the king apparently sent him to Rome for some time.

In 1482, after the resignation of Richard Forbes, James Chisholm became Dean of Aberdeen. From 1482 too, James was claiming to have received papal provision as Dean of Moray, an office he never seems to have gained possession of. He was still claiming the title when he was provided as Bishop of Dunblane on 31 January 1487. Chisholm was consecrated at an unknown date that fell between 11 July 1487 and 28 January 1488.

Chisholm's long episcopate saw, among other things, the disastrous Battle of Flodden, a growth in the resources available to the cathedral, the addition of nine new chaplainries to the choir, and the addition of parapets to the tower and choir of the cathedral. In 1526, James partially gave up the bishopric for his half-brother William Chisholm (I); on 6 June 1526, Pope Clement VII provided William to the bishopric. James however retained the fruits of the see – possession and control of its resources – with a right to return if he chose; he bore the style "administrator of Dunblane" for some time after, possibly until his death, though such a style is attested only once, on 26 March 1534.

That was James' last appearance in contemporary sources. James Chisholm's death cannot be dated with certainty, but it is likely that he died in the year 1546; he was certainly dead by 20 January 1546.

== Notes ==
Religious titles
Preceded by Richard Forbes	Dean of Aberdeen; 1482–1487	Succeeded by Gavin Dunbar
Preceded by John Herspolz	Bishop of Dunblane; 1487–1526	Succeeded by William Chisholm (I)
