= Petrus Boeri =

French Benedictine canonist and bishop

Petrus Boeri (b. during the first quarter of the 14th century at Laredorte, Aude, canton of Peyriac Minervois; d. probably 1388) was a French Benedictine canonist and bishop.

== Life ==
Of his early life nothing is known. In 1350, when he is first mentioned, Boeri was Abbot of St. Chinian (St. Anianus, Hérault) in the small diocese of Saint-Pons de Tomièrs (Sancti Pontii Tomeriarum) which at that time formed a part of the Metropolitan Province of Narbonne. He attracted the favourable notice of Pope Urban V, who appointed him Bishop of Orvieto, 16 November 1364.

A few years later (7 October 1370) he was transferred by the same pontiff to the See of Vaison, near Avignon in France. But in 1371, shortly after Urban's death, he returned to Orvieto and remained in possession of that see until 28 June 1379, when he was deprived of his bishopric by Pope Urban VI, for having espoused the cause of the Antipope Robert of Geneva, then reigning at Avignon as Clement VII.

Upon his subsequent withdrawal to France he served Charles V of France, in the capacity of ambassador to the pontifical court at Avignon.) However, 31 August 1387, Clement VII likewise deposed him from his episcopal office and entrusted the temporal and spiritual administration of Orvieto to Thomas de Jarente, Bishop of Grasse. Boeri died shortly afterwards.

== Works ==
He was the author of two commentaries on the Rule of St. Benedict; in one, written when he was Abbot of St. Chinian, he deals with the Rule from the point of view of the canonist; in the other, written in the Sacro Speco at Subiaco when he was Bishop of Orvieto, he deals with it more from the point of view of the ascetic. He dedicated the later commentary to Charles V, King of France.

He also wrote a commentary on the Constitution "Pastor bonus" of Benedict XII; "Speculum Monachorum"; "De Signis locutionum"; "Notæ in Damasi Pontificale" (an annotated copy of the "Liber Pontificalis", likewise dedicated to Charles V); and began at Rouen in 1379 a treatise on the question of calling a general council with a view to ending the Western Schism. This treatise remained unfinished.

With the exception of "In Regulam S.P. Benedicti Commentarium" (ed. Leone Allodi, Subiaco, Rome) and "Notæ in Damasi Pontificale" Boeri's works have not been printed.
