= Vaison-la-Romaine =

Vaison-la-Romaine Veisoun (Occitan)
- Commune
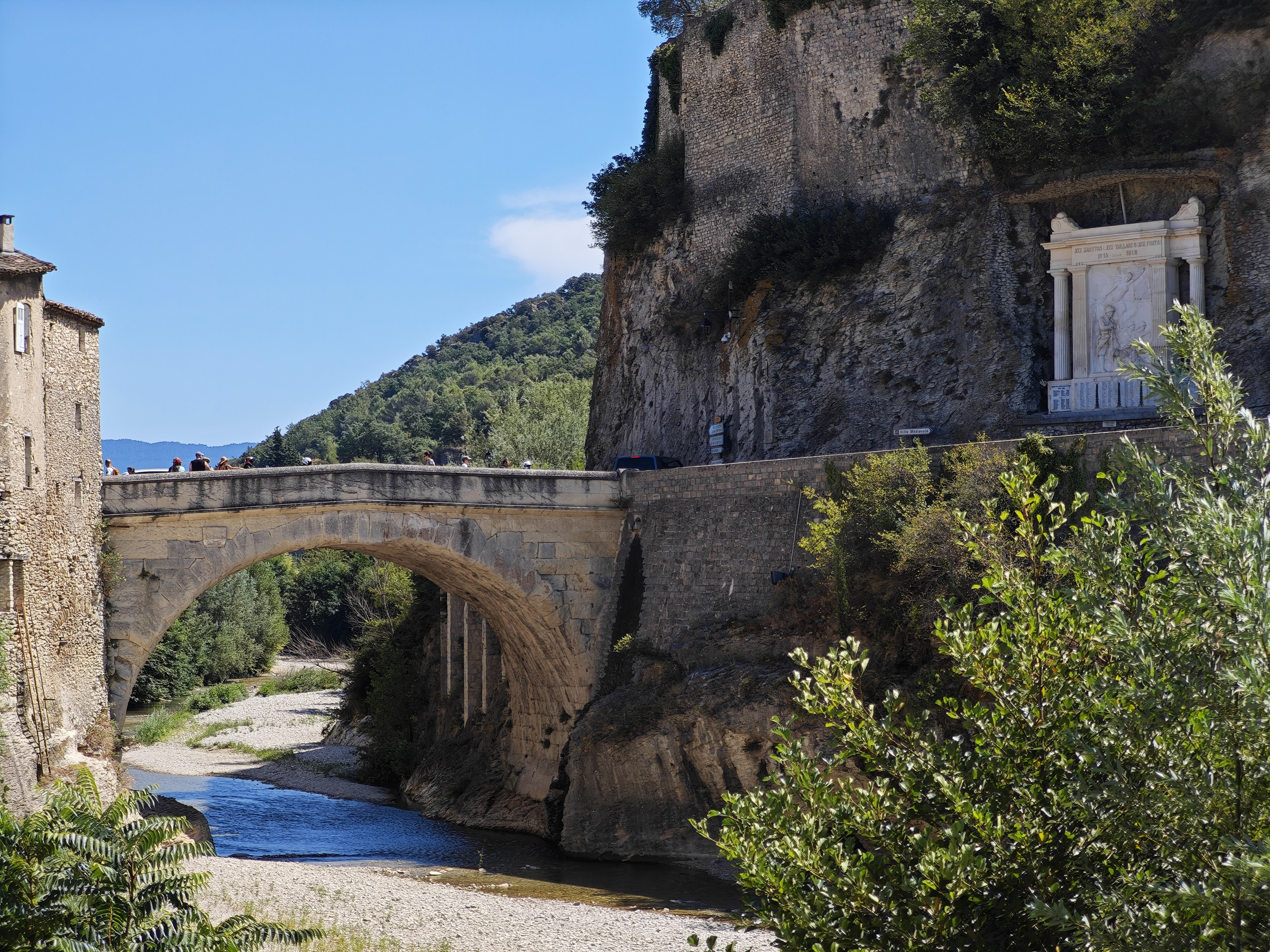
- Vaison-la-Romaine Roman Bridge

- Coat of arms
- Location of Vaison-la-Romaine
- Location within France Location within Provence-Alpes-Côte d'Azur
- Coordinates: 44°14′32″N 5°04′21″E
- Country: France
- Region: Provence-Alpes-Côte d'Azur
- Department: Vaucluse
- Arrondissement: Carpentras
- Canton: Vaison-la-Romaine
- Intercommunality: CC Vaison Ventoux

Government
  - Mayor (2020–2026): Jean-François Périlhou
- Area^{1}: 26.99 km^{2} (10.42 sq mi)
- Elevation: 204 m (669 ft)
- Highest elevation: 493 m (1,617 ft)
- Lowest elevation: 156 m (512 ft)
- Population (2023): 6,058
  - Density: 224.5/km^{2} (581.3/sq mi)
- Demonym: Vaisonnais
- Time zone: UTC+01:00 (CET)
  - Summer (DST): UTC+02:00 (CEST)
- INSEE/Postal code: 84137 /84110
- Website: www.vaison-la-romaine.com
- ^{1} French Land Register data, which excludes lakes, ponds, glaciers > 1 km^{2} (0.386 sq mi or 247 acres) and river estuaries.

Vaison-la-Romaine (French pronunciation: [vɛzɔ̃ la ʁɔmɛn]; lit. 'Vaison-the-Roman'; Occitan: Veisoun) is a commune in the Vaucluse department in the Provence-Alpes-Côte d'Azur region in southeastern France.

Its inhabitants are called the Vaisonnais. It has 6,237 residents (17,386 for the Communauté de Communes).

Labeled the "Plus Beaux Détours de France" and "Petites Cités de Caractère", it is known for it rich Roman ruins, including a large theater and a unique single-arch bridge, its two cathedrals, as well as its medieval town (Haute-Ville) and urban palaces.

It is also famous for its Provençal market, one of the oldest and most important in Provence, with nearly 500 merchants in the summer season - authorized by Pope Sixtus IV in 1483. Located near vineyards with appellations, it is the central town of the Vaison Ventoux Provence tourist region.

Vaison-la-Romaine is also renowned for its art scene. It has four theaters and many exhibition spaces and galleries. It hosts cultural events, including the international Vaison Danses festival, as well as polyphonic singing festivals, which have helped it earn the label "European Choral City". Many writers, painters and actors live in the area.

== History ==
The area was inhabited in the Bronze Age. At the end of the 4th century BC, Vaison became the capital of a Celtic tribe, the Vocontii, centred on the oppidum in the upper city.

=== The Roman period ===
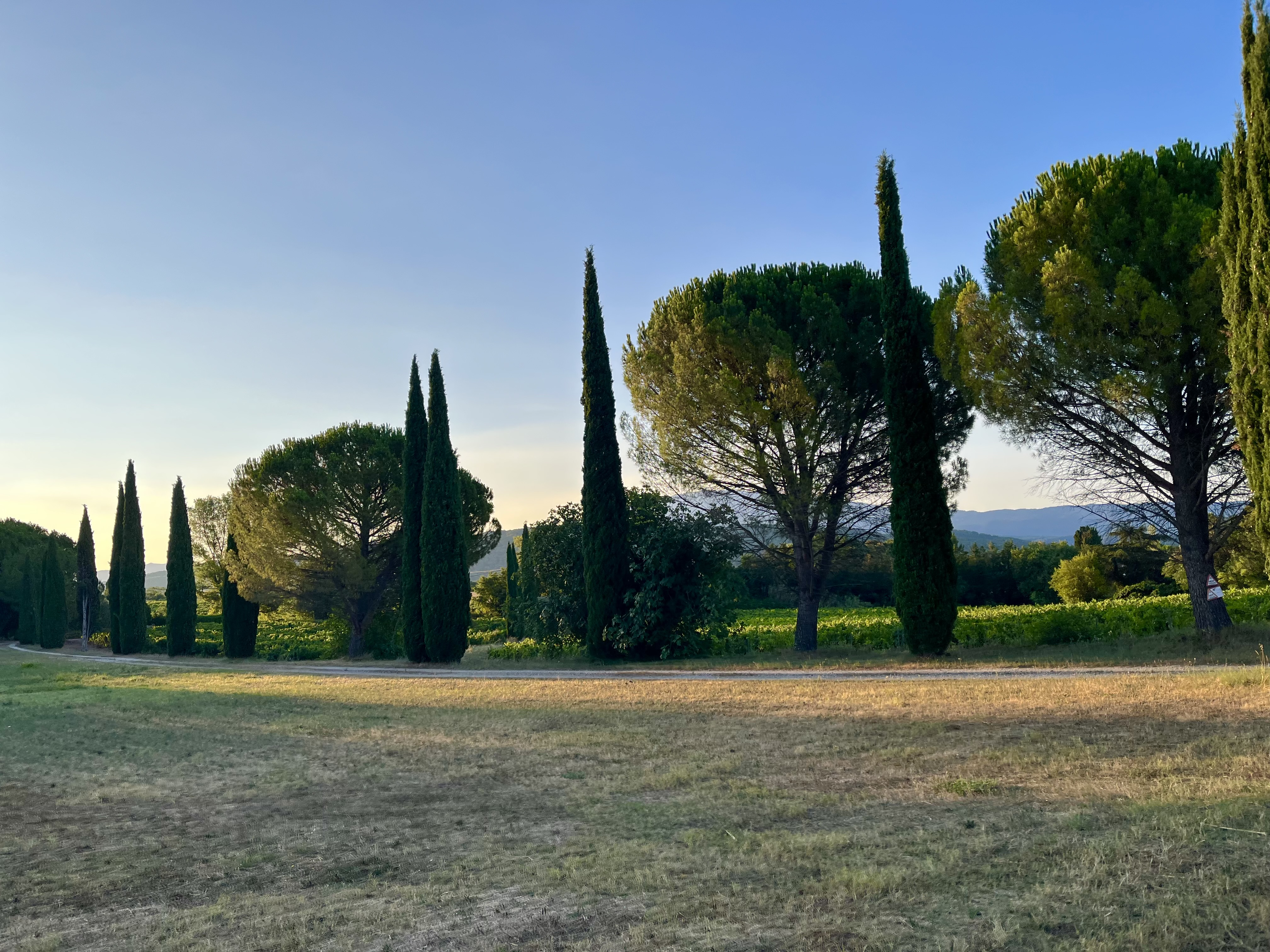
Mediterranean climate of Vaison-la-Romaine

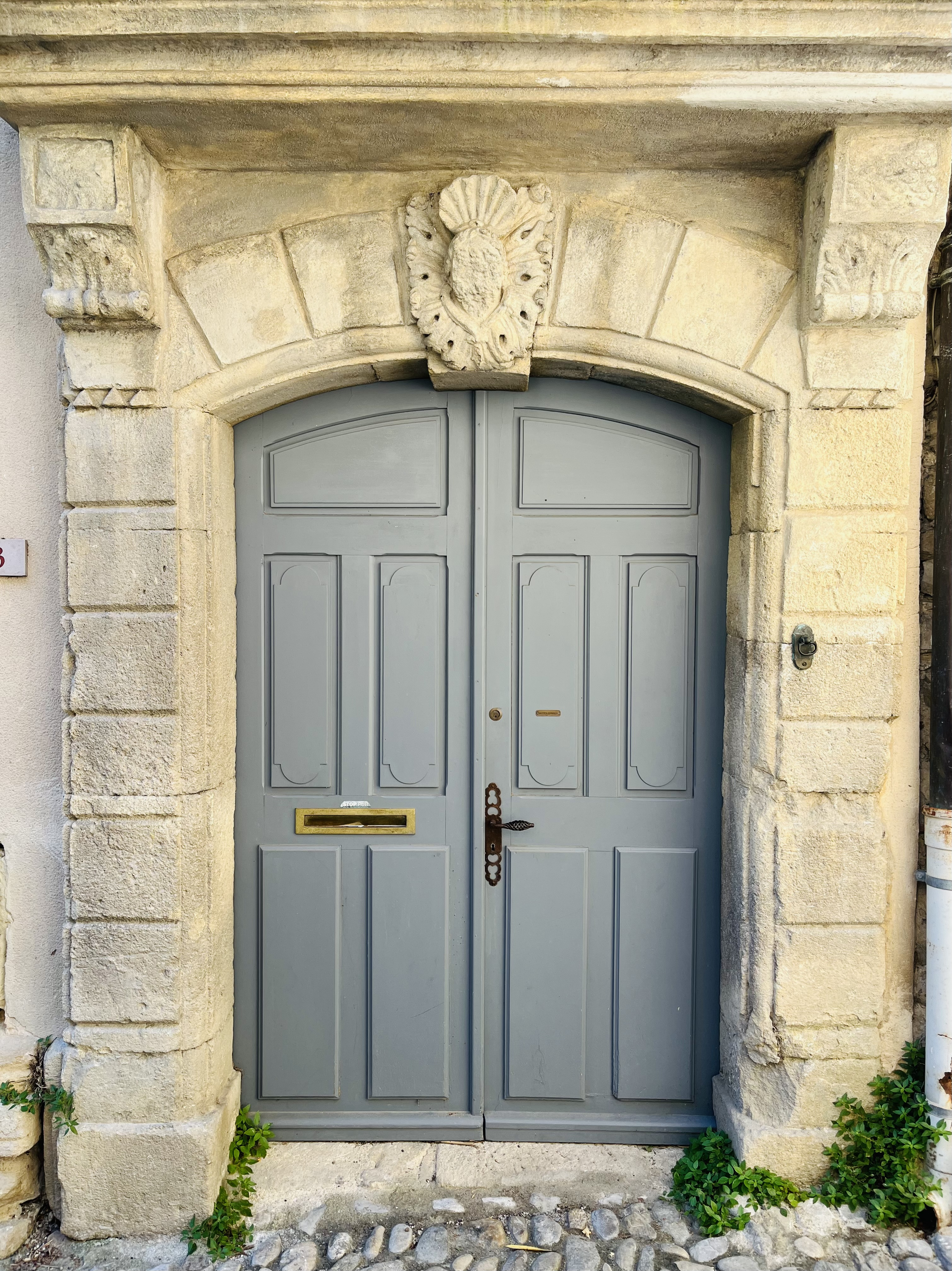
Urban palace, Haute-Ville, Vaison-la-Romaine

After the Roman conquest (125–118 BC) in the wars against the Salyes, the Vocontii retained a certain degree of autonomy; they had two capitals, Luc-en-Diois, apparently the religious centre, and Vaison which was named Vasio Julia Vocontiorum. Their authority continued in the gradual Romanisation of the Celtic oppidum. Early building was probably done by Vocontian aristocrats who moved down from the oppidum and established houses along the river, around which the city eventually accreted but based on a Roman orthogonal street plan with different alignment from the earlier houses.

Construction of large public monuments began in the second half of the 1st century including a theatre, bridge, aqueducts, and thermal baths. Two aqueducts provided water to the city; the older one had its source on the Sainte-Croix hill to the north, while the longer one's source was at the Groseau spring on Mont Ventoux 10 kilometres (6 mi) to the south-east.

The Pax Romana led to the extension of the city which was at its finest in the 2nd century, when it covered up to 75 hectares (190 acres). It became one of the richest of Gallia Narbonensis; many houses with numerous mosaic pavements have been discovered and there is a fine theatre on a rocky hillslope, probably built during the reign of Tiberius, whose statue was found in a prominent place on site. The statue, the Vaison Diadumenos (now in the British Museum), was also discovered in the theatre in the 19th century.

The barbarian invasions were presaged by pillaging and burning in 276, from which Roman Vasio recovered. Vaison became a relatively important Christian religious centre (a bishopric existed there from the 4th century) where two councils met in 442 and 529.

=== The Post-Roman period ===
The barbarian invasions of the 5th century by the Burgundians ruined the city. The theatre's benches began to be reused as Christian tombstones. Vaison was taken by the Ostrogoths in 527 then by Chlothar I, King of the Franks, in 545 and became part of Provence.

Disputes in the 12th century between the counts of Provence, who had refortified the ancient "upper town", and the bishops, each of whom were in possession of half the town, were injurious to its prosperity; they were ended by a treaty negotiated in 1251 by the future pope Clement IV, a native of Saint-Gilles-du-Gard.

In disturbed times of the Middle Ages, the inhabitants migrated to higher ground on the left bank of Ouvèze, with the shelter of the ramparts and a strong castle. From the 18th century, most of the population moved back down to the plains by the river.

A flood struck Vaison-la-Romaine on 22 September 1992, the worst since 1632.

== Population ==
Historical population
| Year | Pop. | ±% p.a. |
|---|---|---|
| 1968 | 4,402 | — |
| 1975 | 5,210 | +2.44% |
| 1982 | 5,862 | +1.70% |
| 1990 | 5,663 | −0.43% |
| 1999 | 5,904 | +0.46% |
| 2007 | 6,248 | +0.71% |
| 2012 | 6,123 | −0.40% |
| 2017 | 5,999 | −0.41% |
| 2023 | 6,058 | +0.16% |
Source: INSEE

== Main sights ==
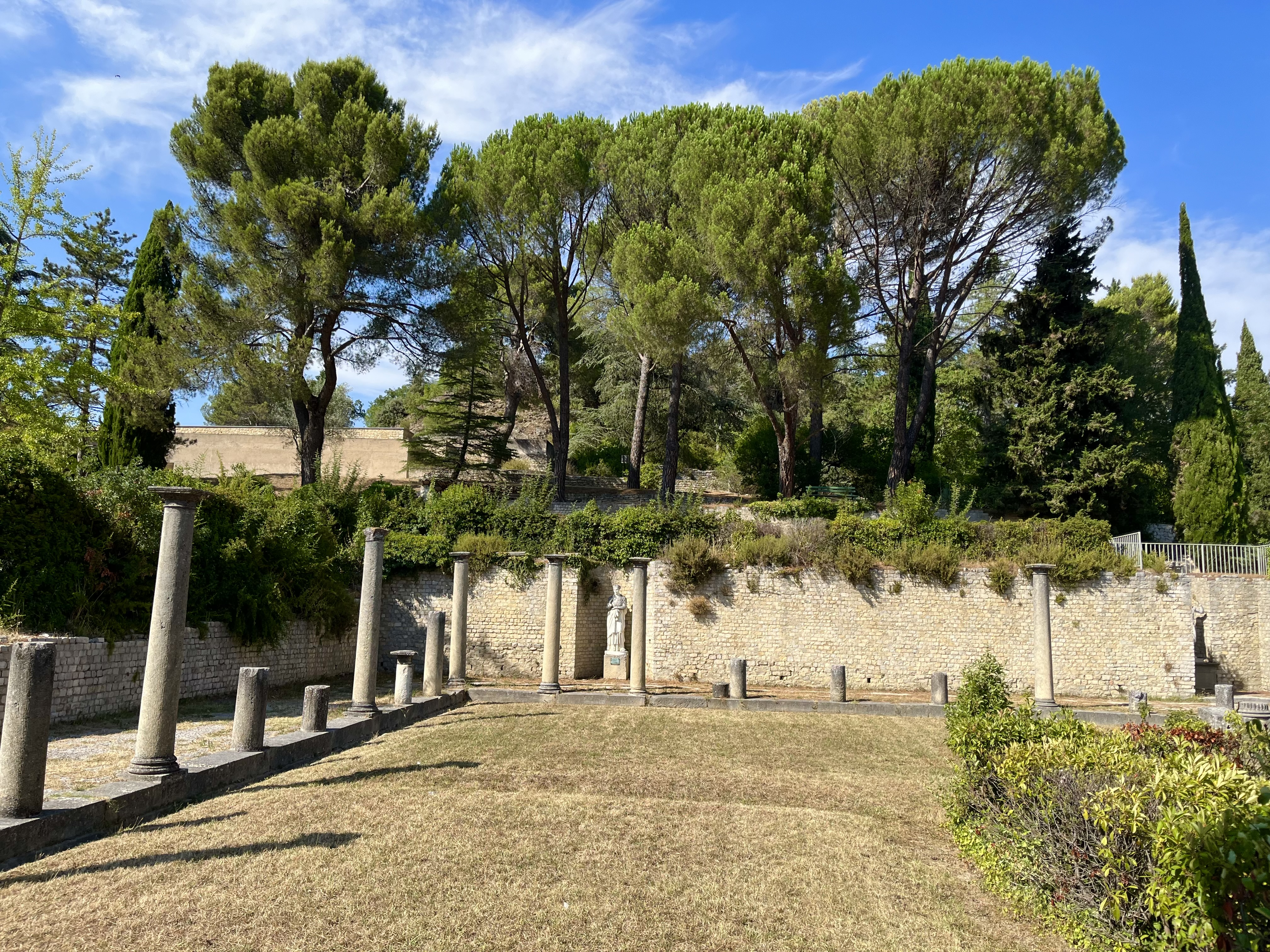
Roman site, Vaison-la-Romaine

The Roman ruins lie in the valley on the banks of the river Ouvèze which is crossed by a Roman bridge from the 1st century AD. The Roman ruins are in two main areas: La Villasse and Puymin.

Several large and rich town houses have been excavated:

- the House of the Dolphin (area 2700 m²)
- the House of the Laurelled Apollo (2000 m²)
- the House of the Arbour (3000 m²)
- the House of the Peacock (1000 m²)

The houses must have belonged to the Vocontii aristocracy who owned estates in the region.

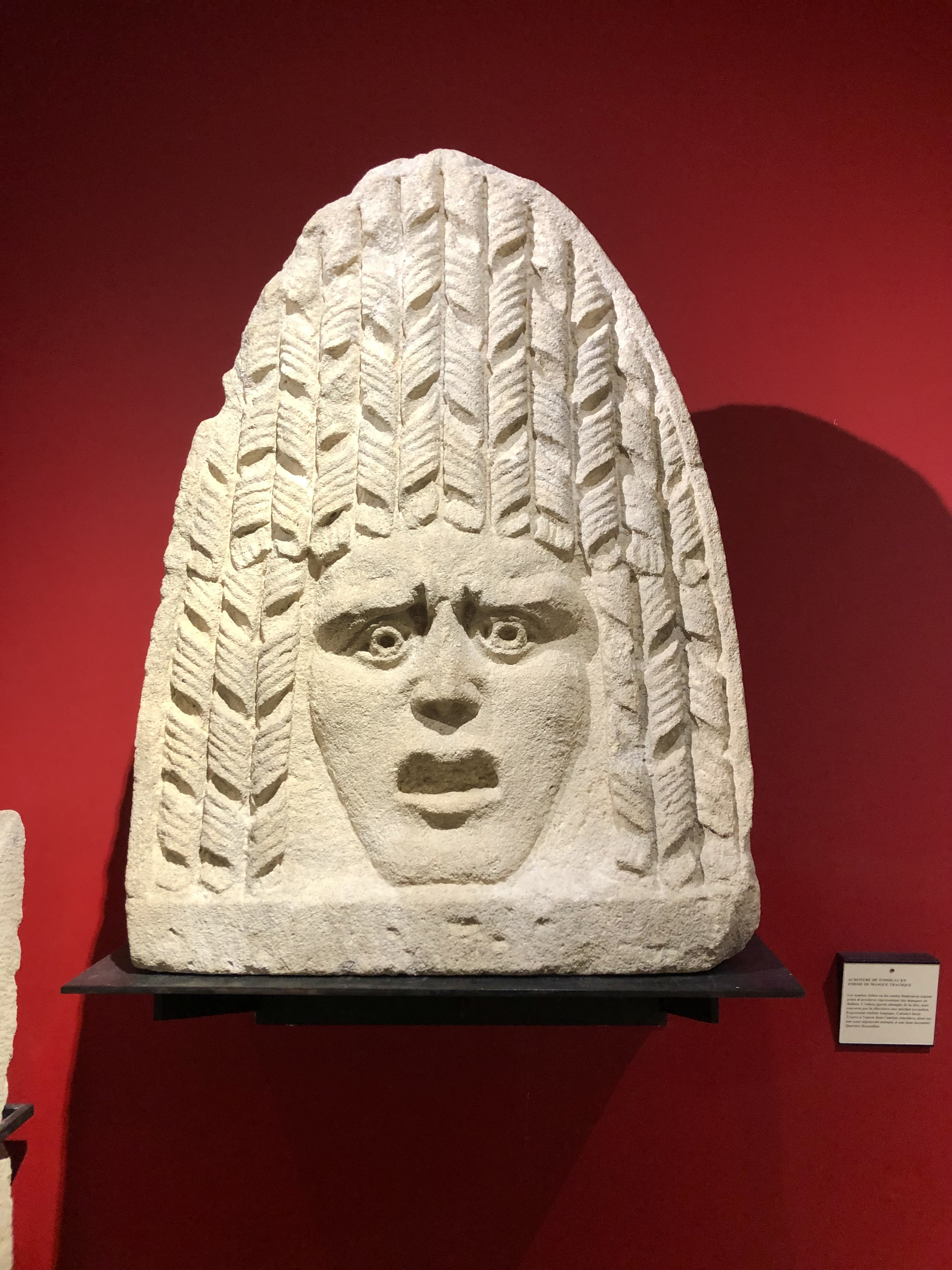
Archeological Museum, Vaison-la-Romaine

A large number of artifacts originating from Vaison-la-Romaine are now dispersed among 25 museums worldwide, mostly in Europe and North America.

The mediaeval town is high on the rocky hill as attacks were frequent and the town retreated to a more defensible position.

The apse of the Church of St. Quenin, dedicated to Saint Quinidius, seems to date from the 8th century, one of the oldest in France. The cathedral dates from the 11th century, but the apse and the apsidal chapels are from the Merovingian period.

The town also has a famous open air market held on Tuesdays year round.

=== The House of the Dolphin ===
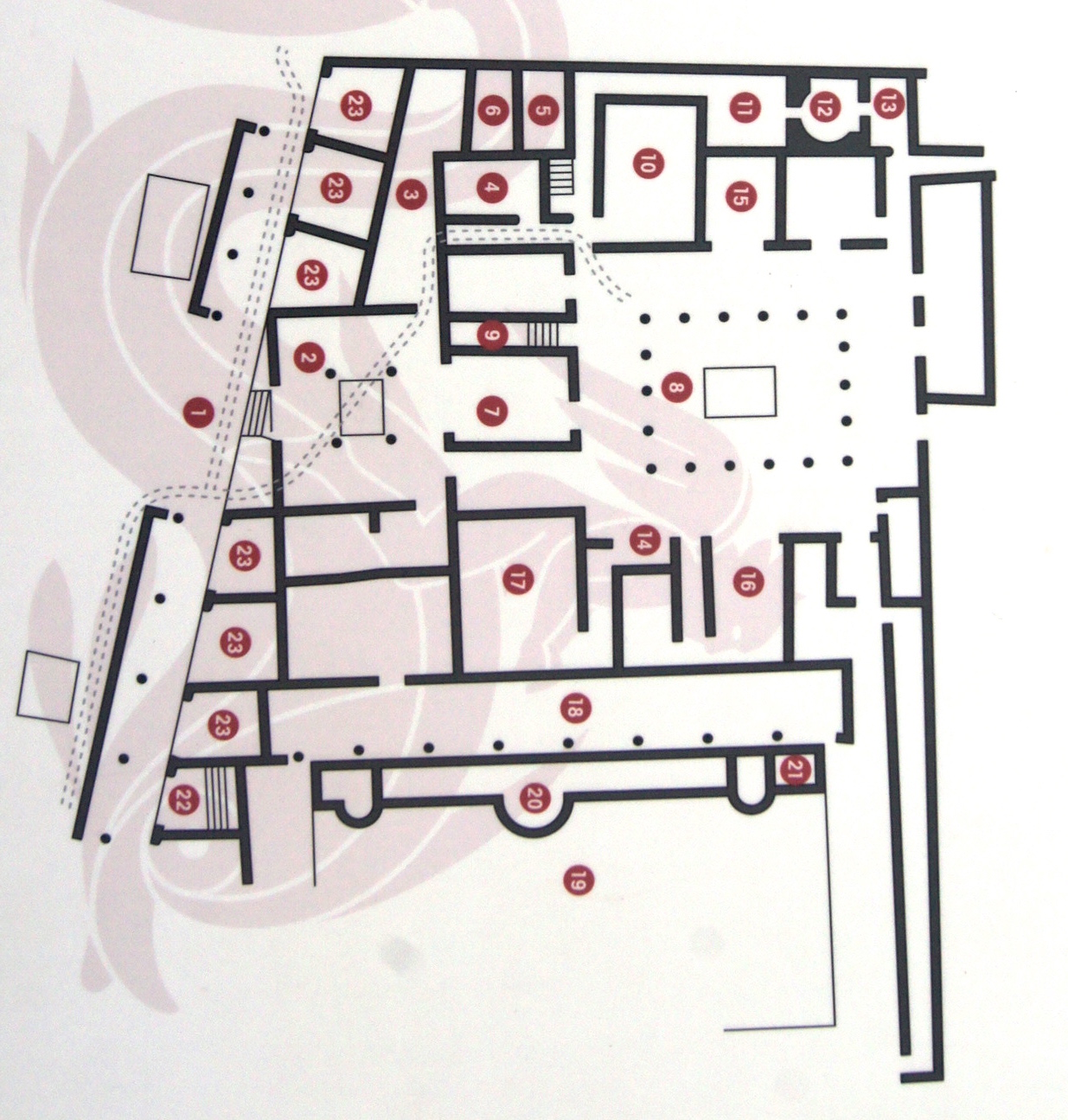
Plan of house of the Dolphin

The Dolphin House owes its name to a white marble fountainhead portraying a cupid riding a dolphin. The structure of the house indicates that it was built in stages over a period of about 250 years. In around 30 BC it was a farmhouse of area 1,400 m² built on a different alignment to the later street grid and with its main entrance to the south. The main building consisted of four rooms arranged around a colonnaded courtyard (peristyle). To the west lay several agricultural outbuildings and a small heated building, probably a thermal bath. 50 years later, water and sewage pipes were added, leading to greatly improved living standards. Around 80 AD, the house was extended over the strip of land up to the new pedestrian street. A new main entrance was built to the north, the peristyle was extended eastwards and adorned with a pond and the upper floor was enlarged.

The private section of the house consists of rooms arranged around the peristyle, including the upper floor accessed by the staircase next to the tablinum.

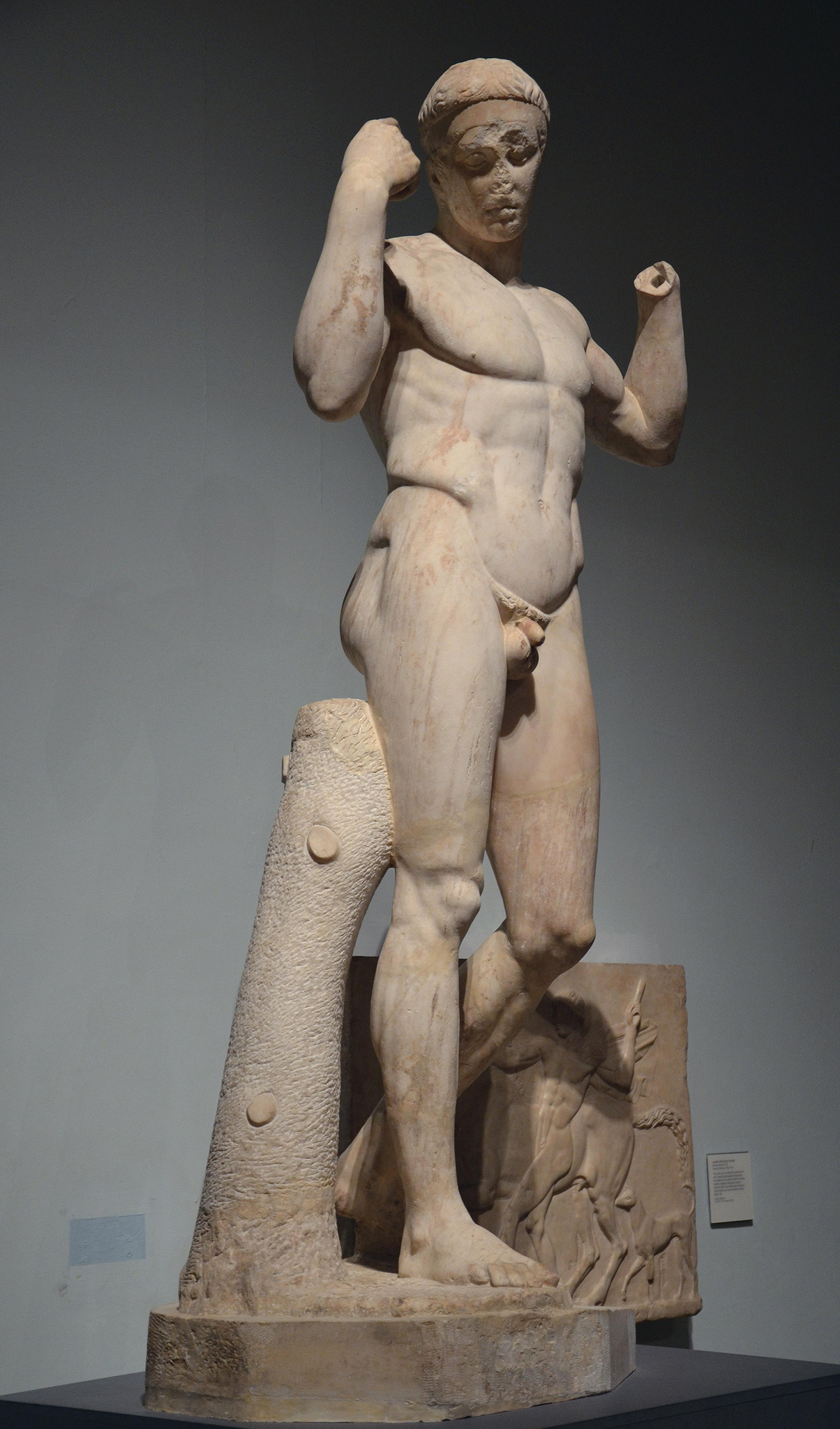
The Vaison Diadumenos in the British Museum

== Twin towns ==
- Martigny, Switzerland
- Dunblane, Scotland

== See also ==
- Ancient Diocese of Vaison
- Belisama
- Council of Vaison
- Dentelles de Montmirail
- Vgo (stonemason)

== Gallery ==
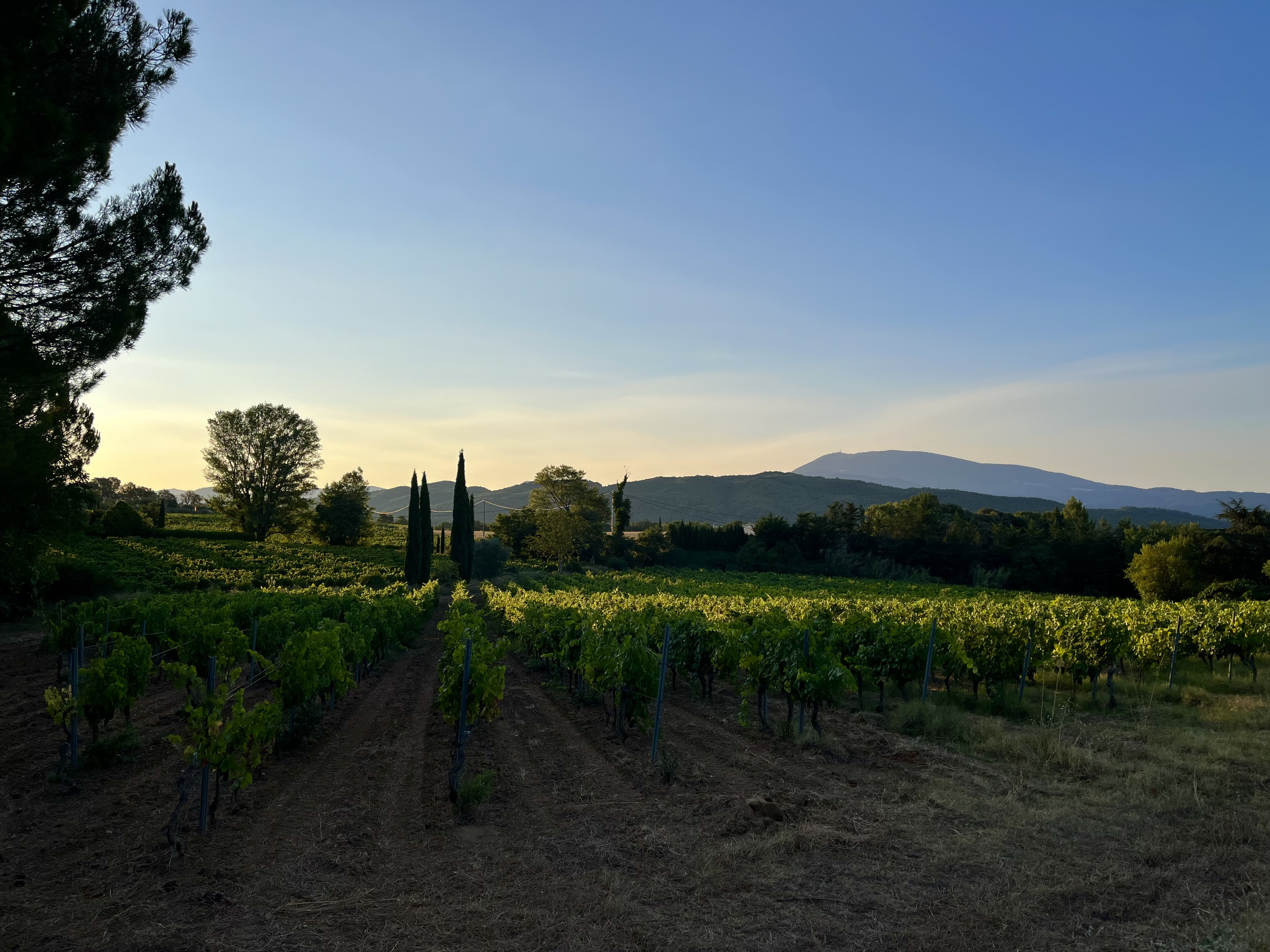
Vineyards around Vaison-la-Romaine

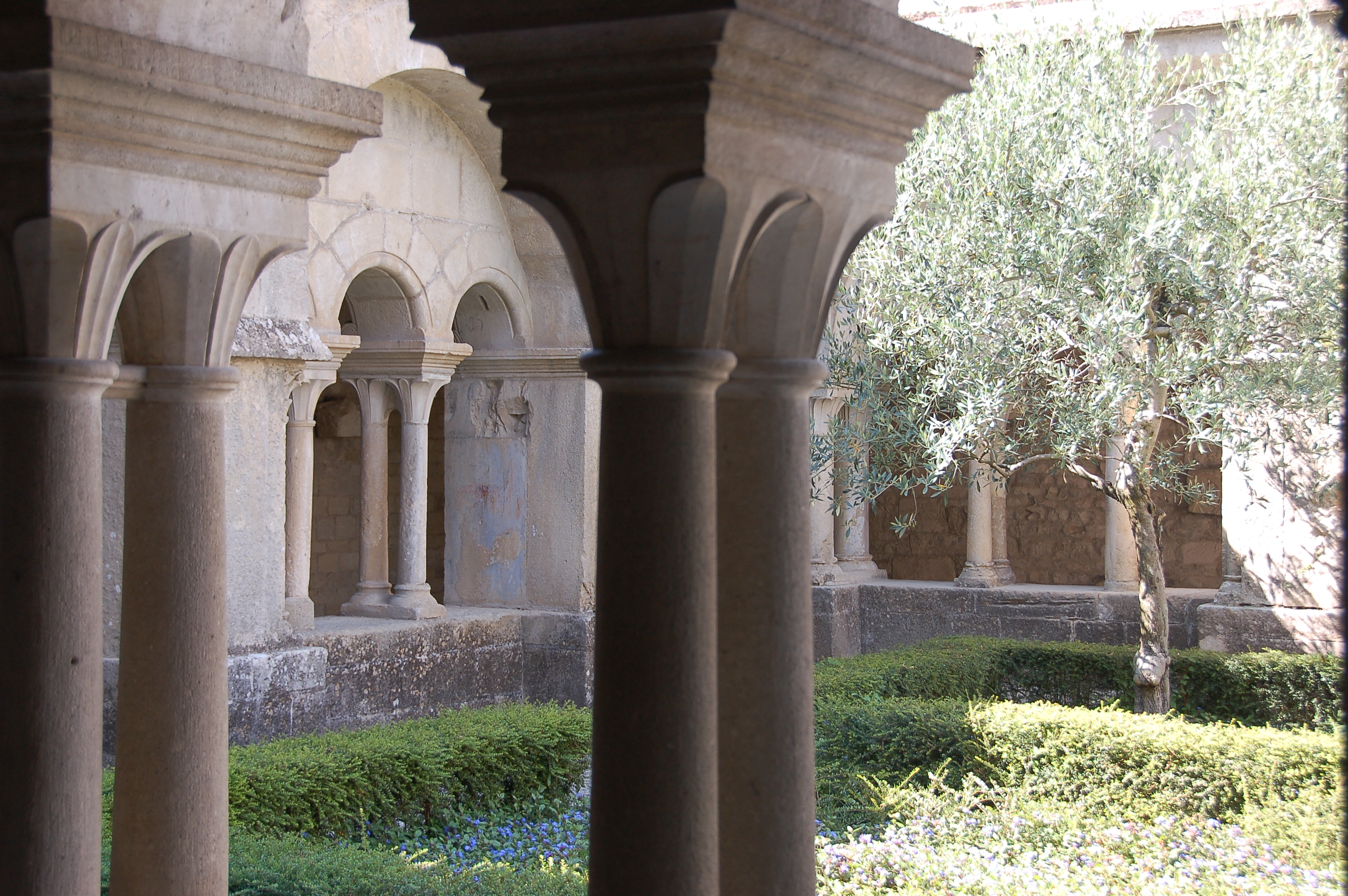
Cloister interior

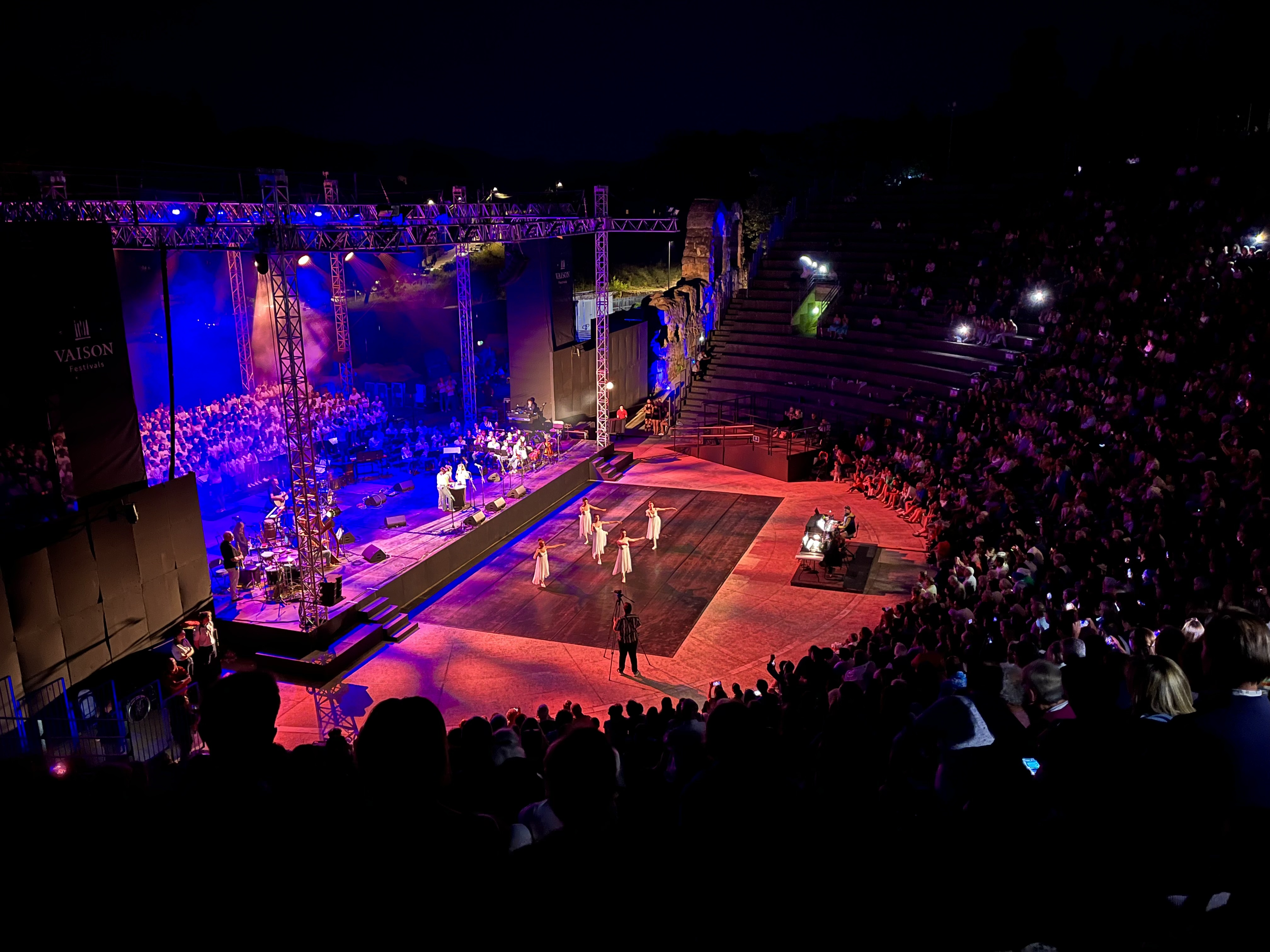
The international Vaison Danses festival, Grand Théâtre, Vaison-la-Romaine

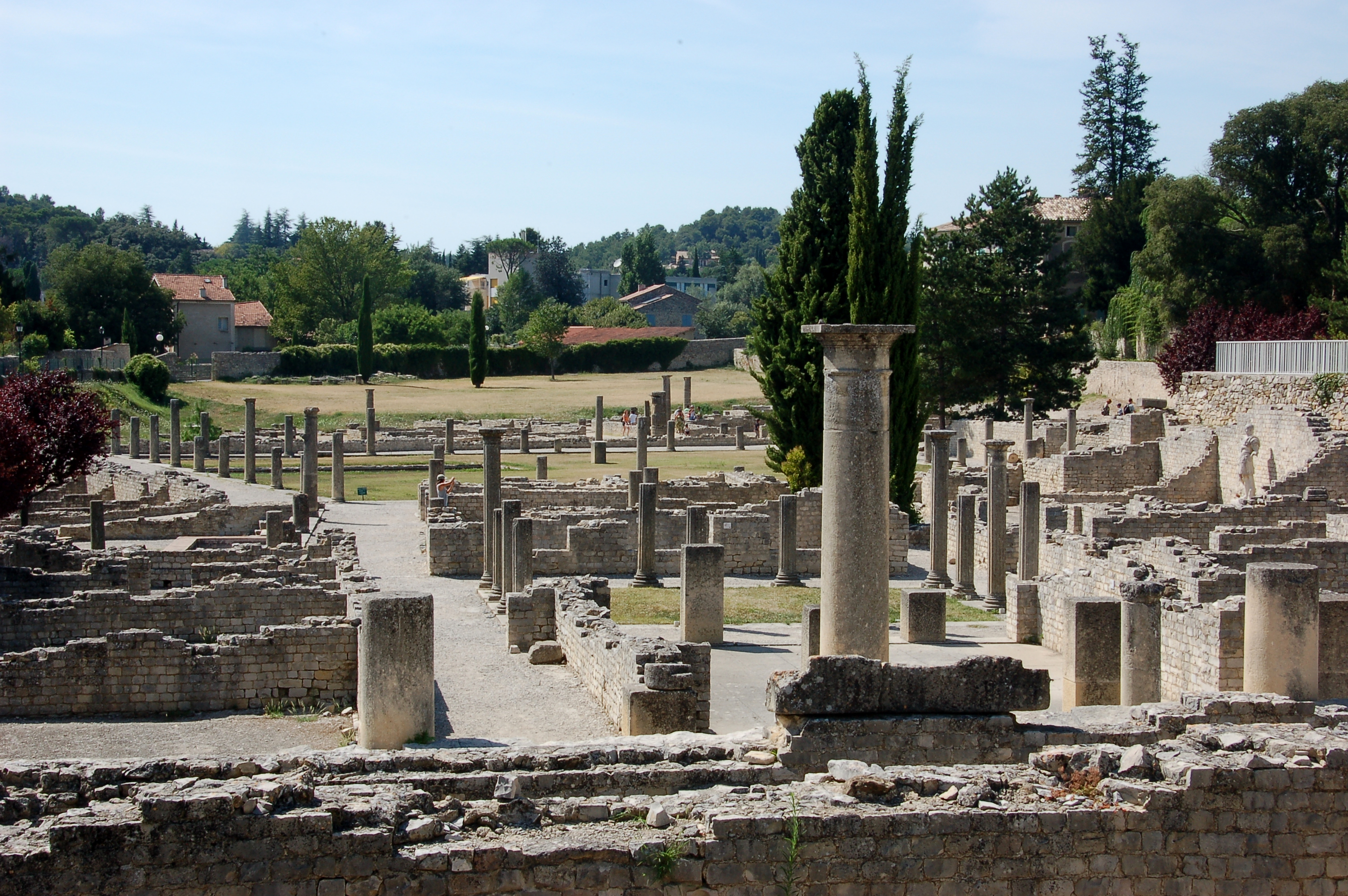
Ruins of a Roman villa

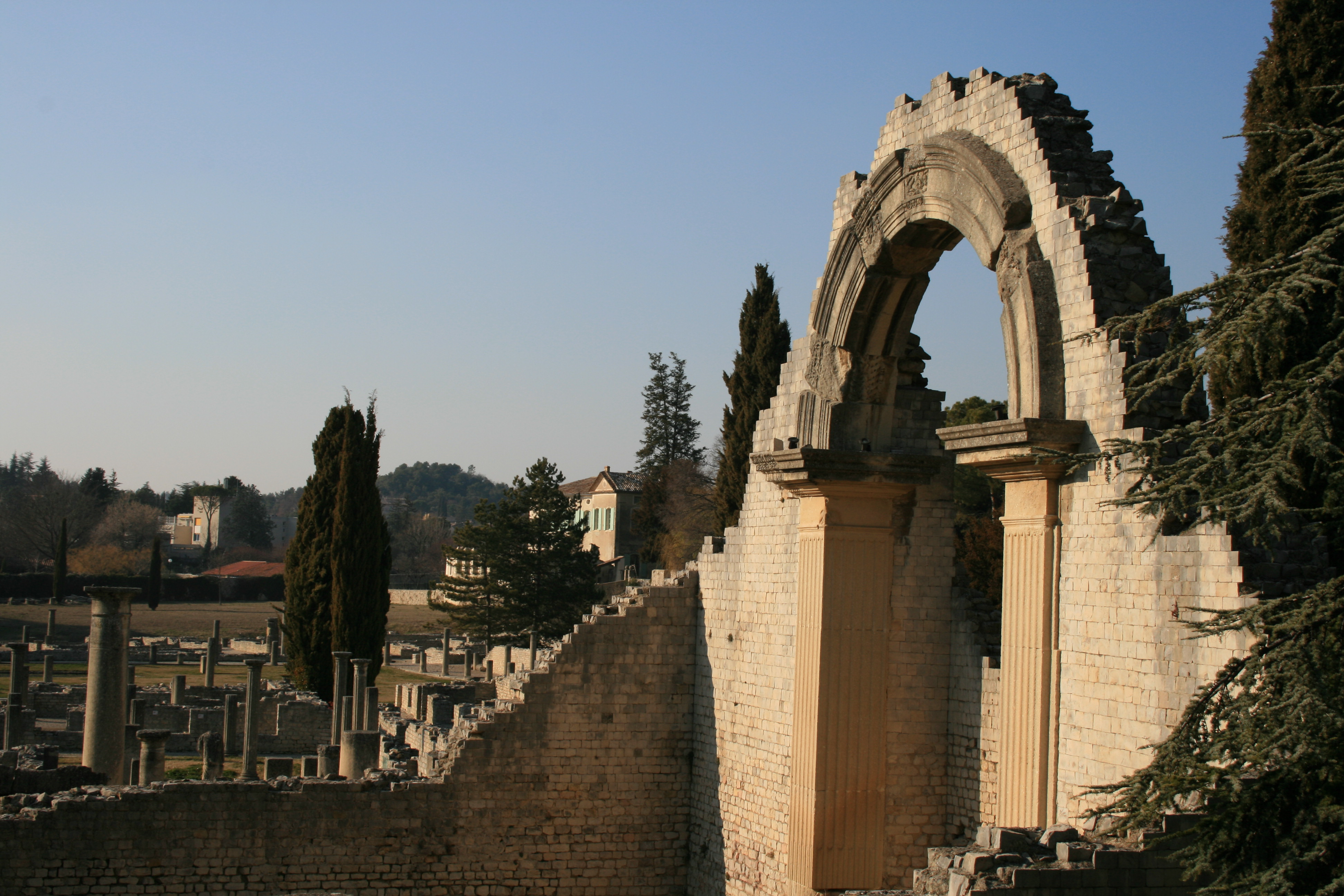
Roman ruins

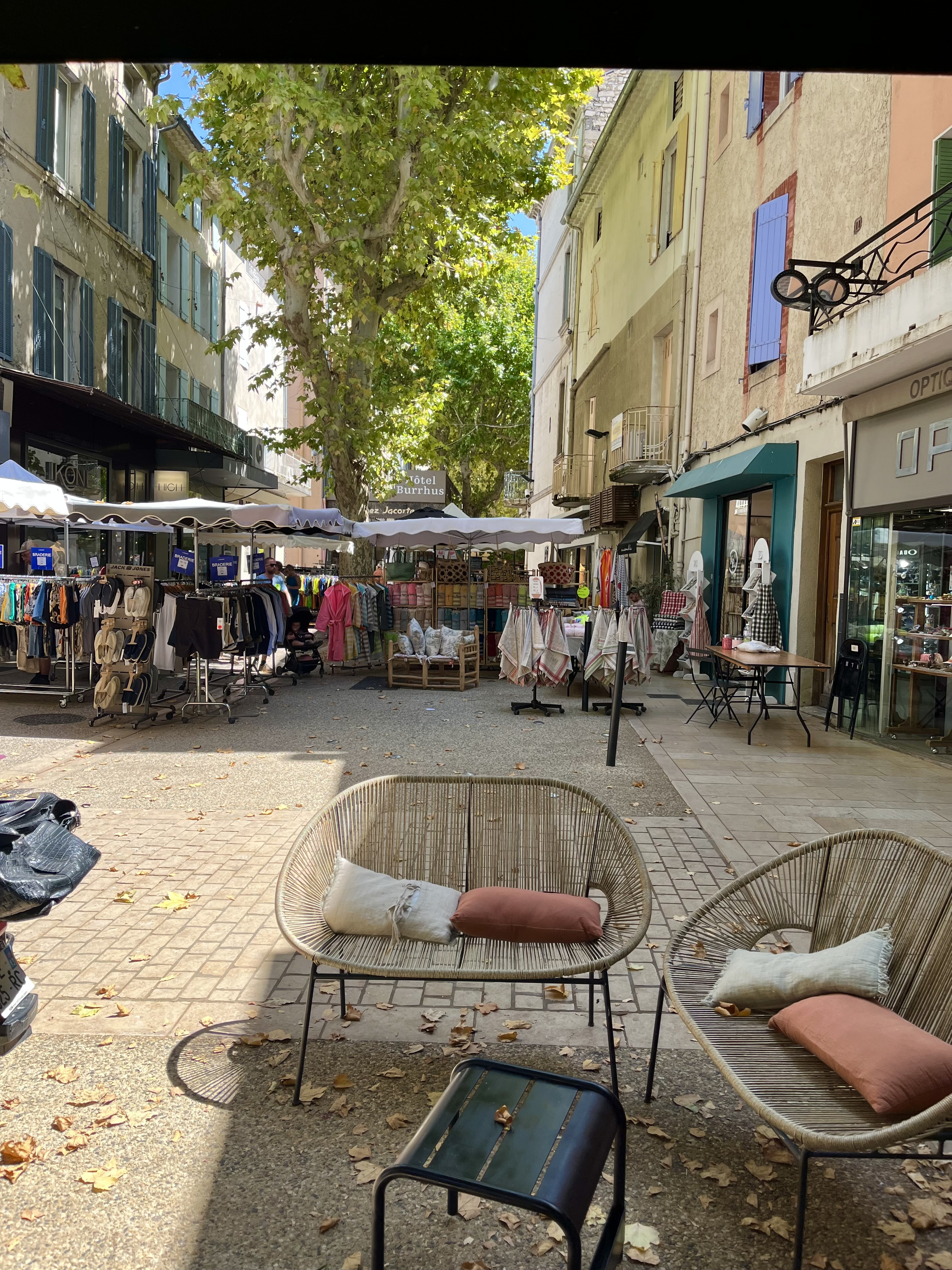
Shops on Cours Henri Fabre, Vaison-la-Romaine

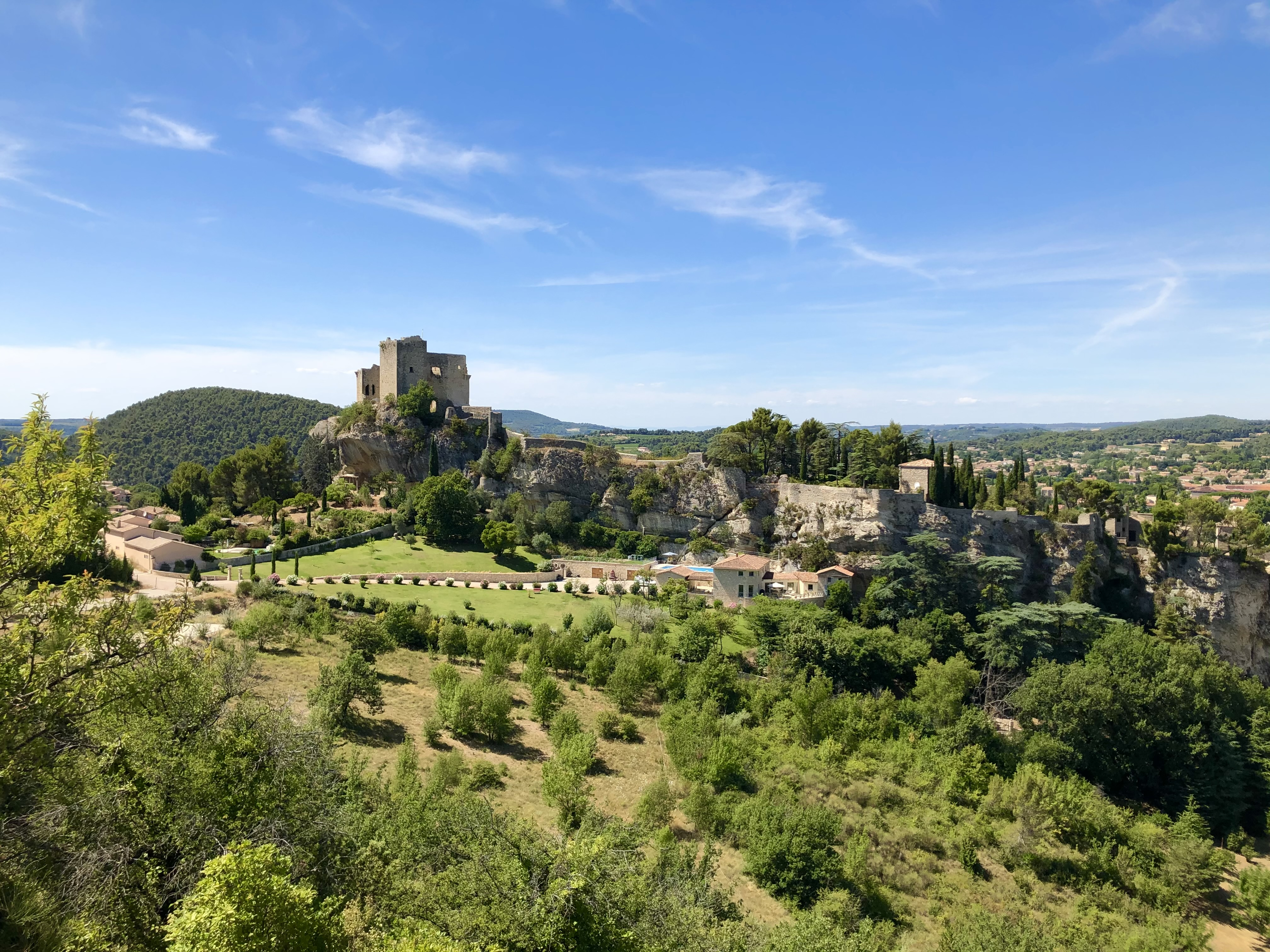
Castle of the counts of Toulouse

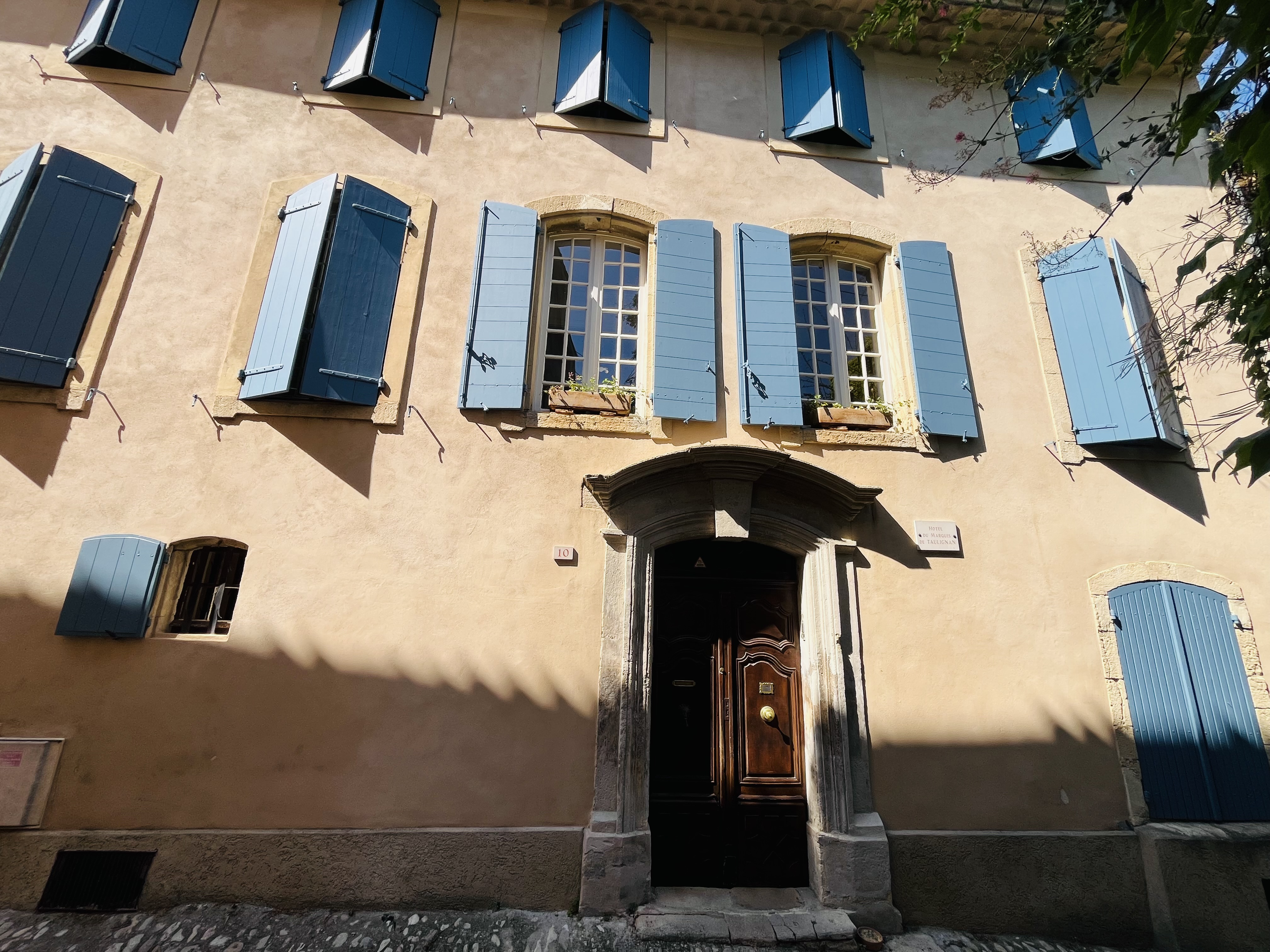
Urban palace, Haute-Ville, Vaison-la-Romaine

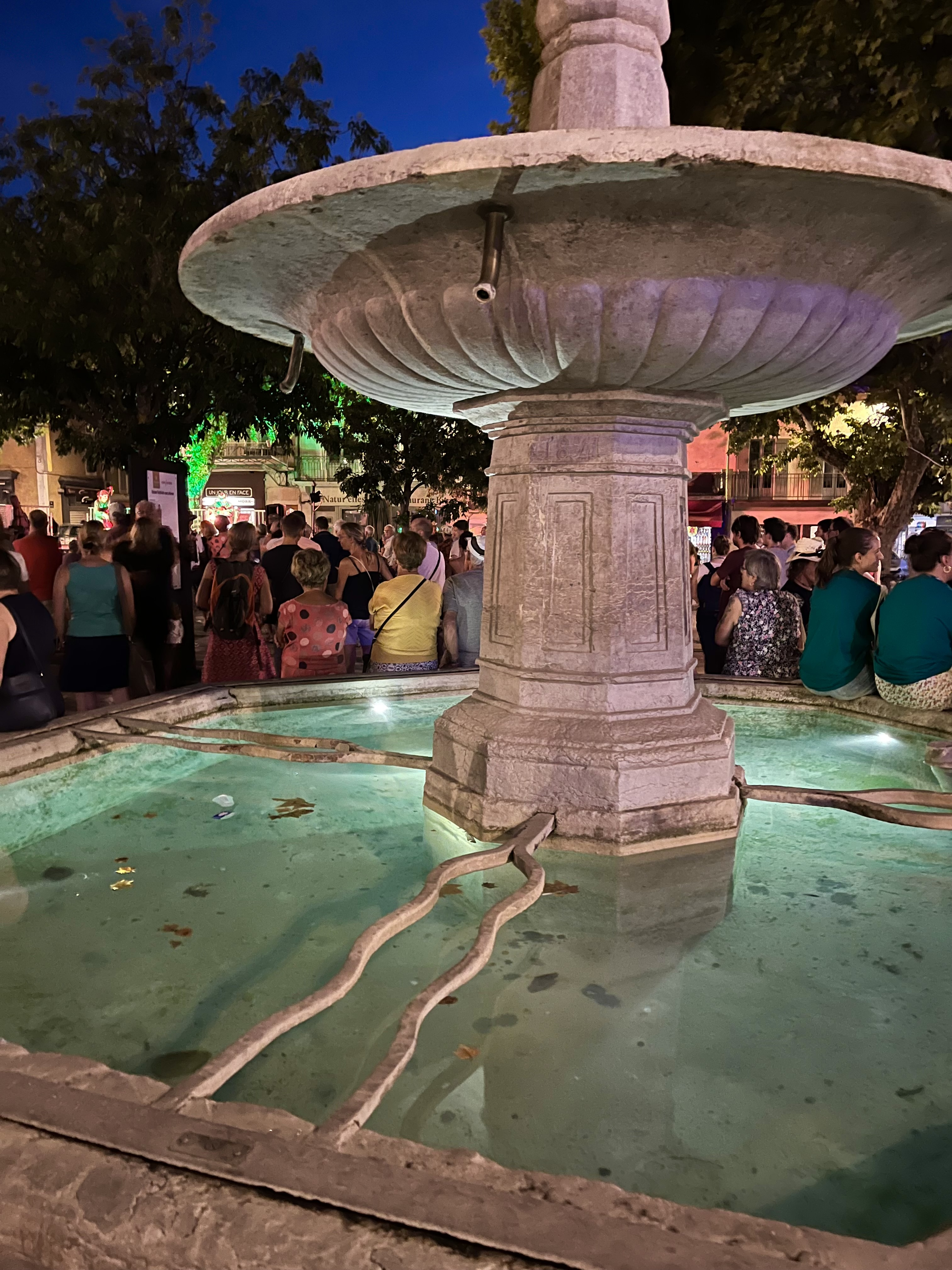
Place Montfort, Vaison-la-Romaine

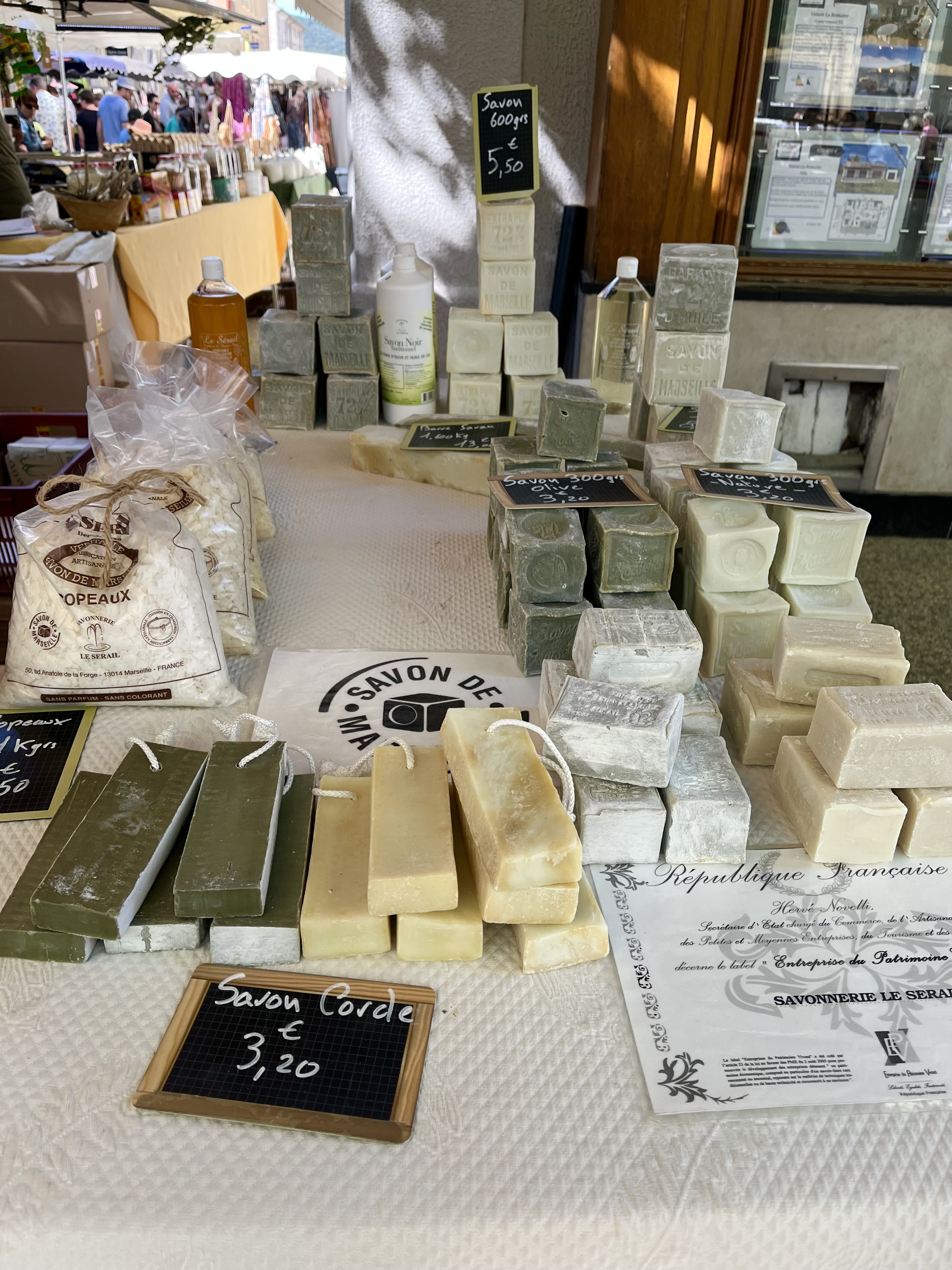
Provençal market of Vaison-la-Romaine

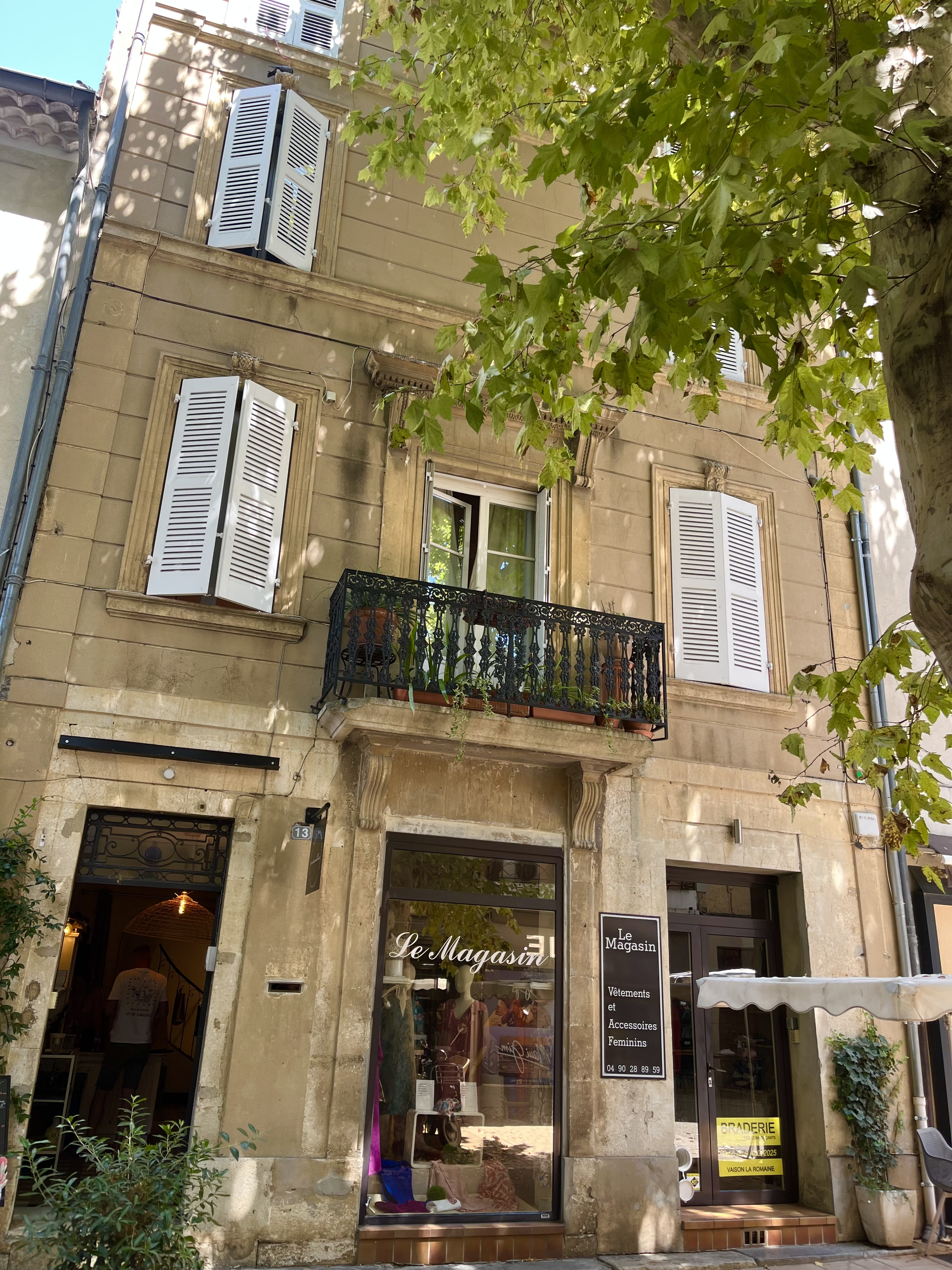
Cours Henri Fabre

== Notable residents ==
- Gnaeus Pompeius Trogus, (1st century BC) was born in Vaison-la-Romaine, historian.
- Maurice Burrus, Alsatian tobacco magnate, politician and philatelist
- Alice Colonieu, French ceramicist, painter and sculptor
- Michel Jeury, French science fiction writer
- Mimie Mathy, French actress, comedian and singer
- Keira Knightley, English actress, owns a house in the area
- Henri Metzger (1912–2007), French archaeologist and Hellenist died here.

== Sources ==
- Rivet, A. L. F. (1988). Gallia Narbonensis: Southern Gaul in Roman Times, part II: "Civitates" (London: Batsford). A brief summary of the archaeology.
