= Vaison Cathedral =

Roman Catholic church and former cathedral in Vaison-la-Romaine, France

Coordinates: 44°14′30″N 5°4′8″E

Vaison Cathedral Cathédrale Notre-Dame-de-Nazareth de Vaison
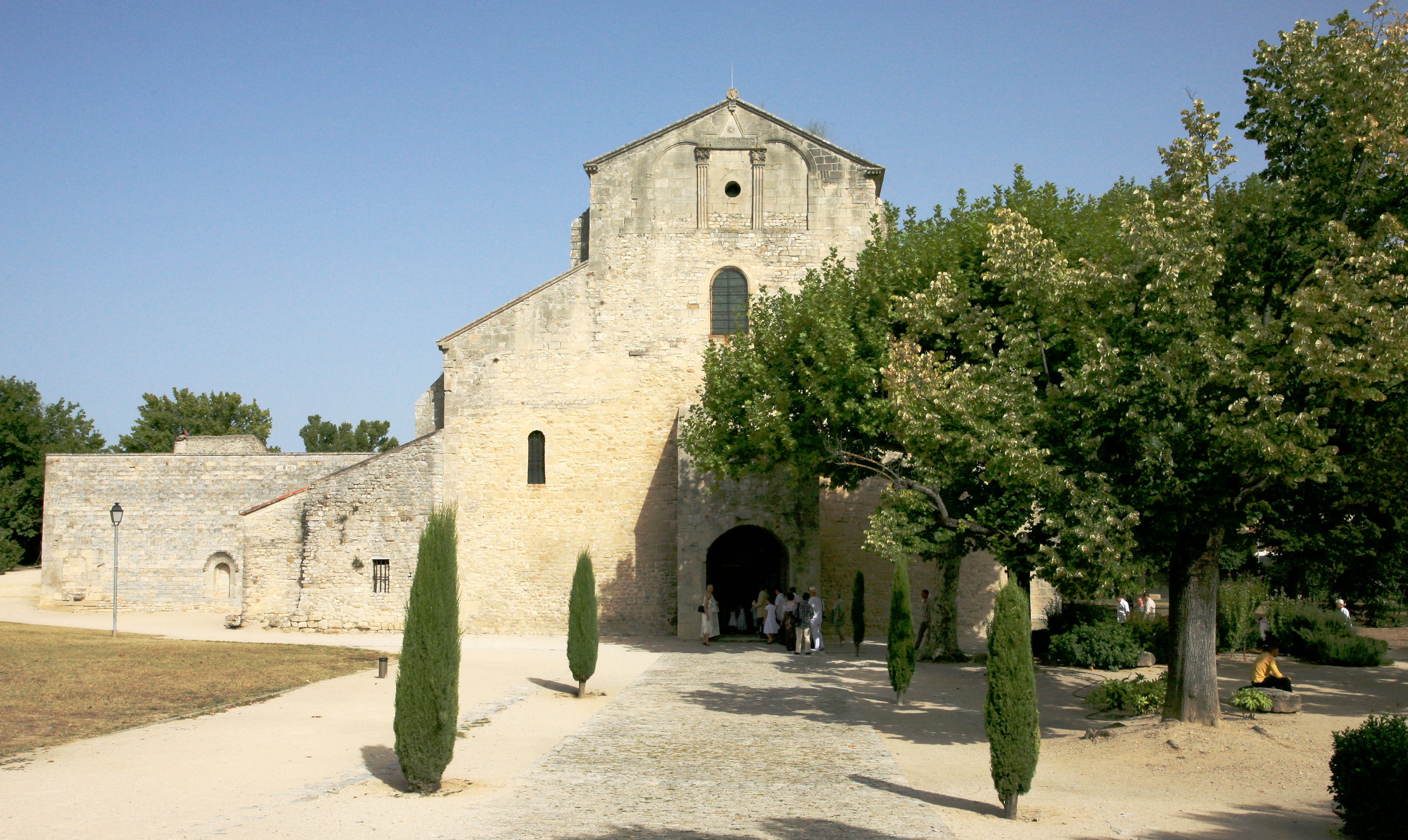
- Vaison Cathedral

Religion
- Affiliation: Roman Catholic Church
- Province: Bishopric of Vaison
- Region: Vaucluse
- Rite: Roman Rite
- Ecclesiastical or organisational status: Cathedral
- Status: Active

Location
- Location: Vaison, France
- Interactive map of Vaison Cathedral; Cathédrale Notre-Dame-de-Nazareth de Vaison

Architecture
- Type: church
- Style: Romanesque
- Groundbreaking: 11th century

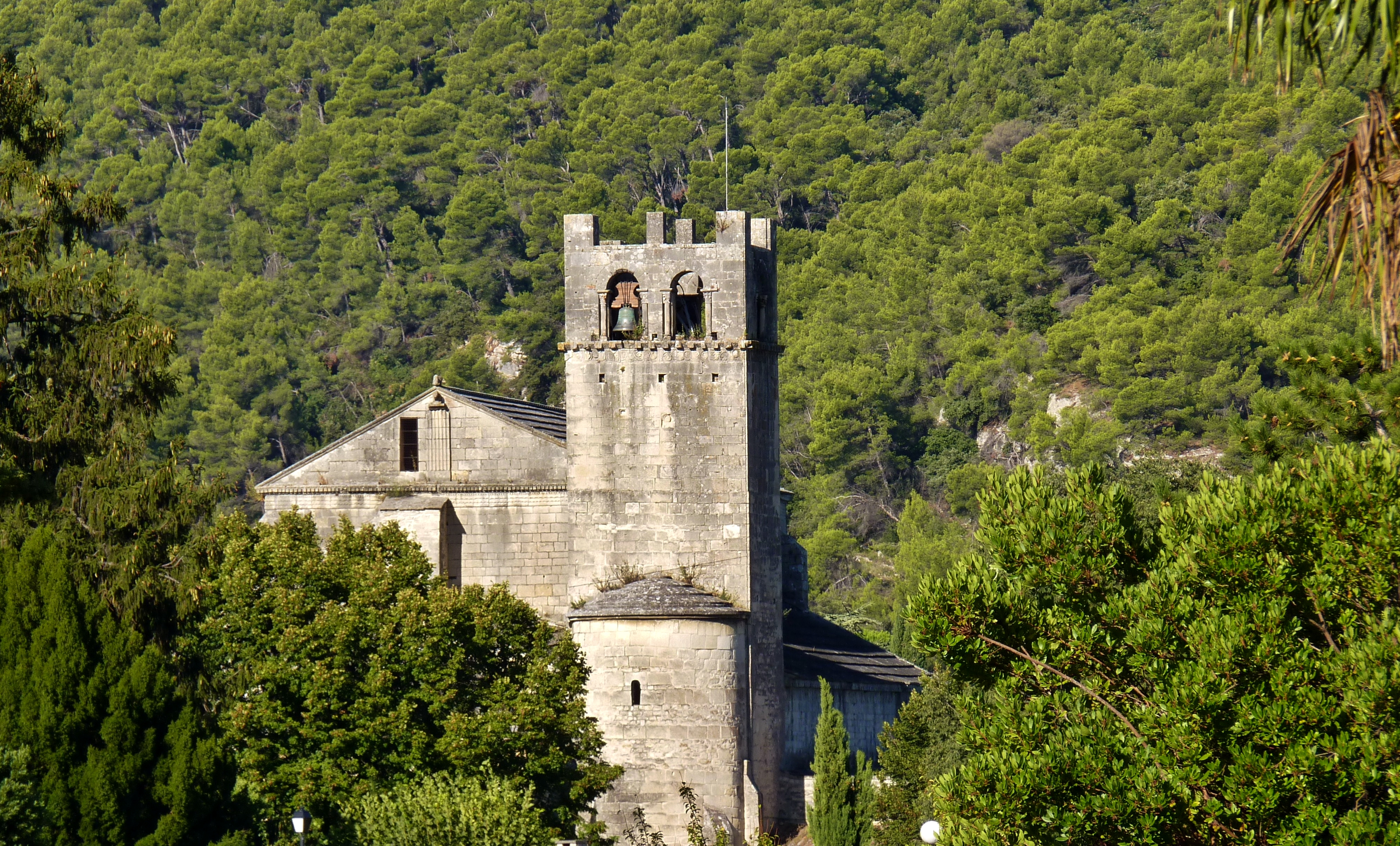
Former Vaison Cathedral (Notre-Dame de Nazareth)

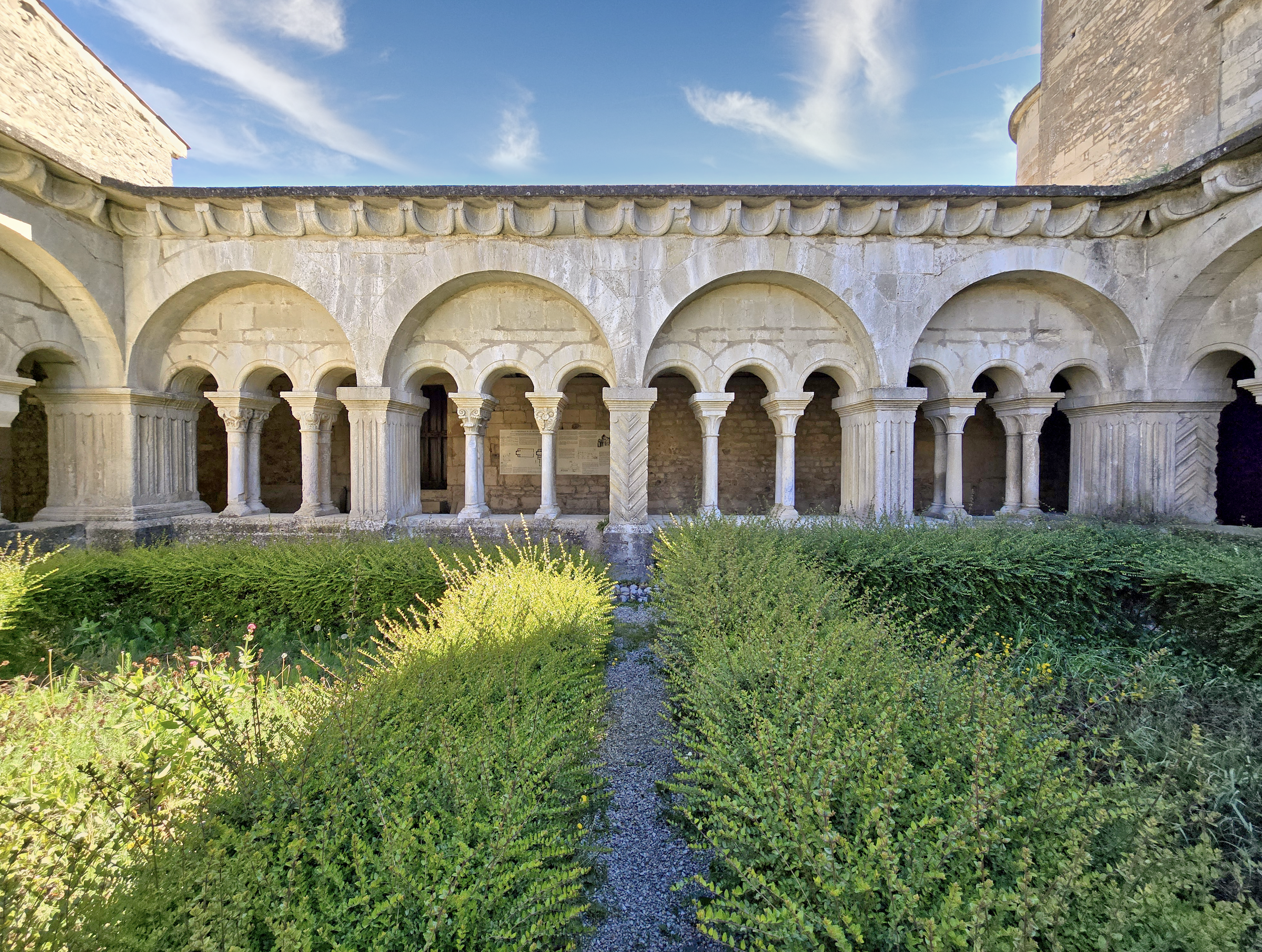
Cloister

Vaison Cathedral, dedicated to Our Lady of Nazareth (French: Cathédrale Notre-Dame de Nazareth de Vaison), is a Roman Catholic church and one of the two former cathedrals in Vaison-la-Romaine, France. It was formerly the seat of the Bishopric of Vaison, abolished under the Concordat of 1801.

The structure of the cathedral in general is Romanesque, and dates from the 11th century; however, the apse and the apsidal chapels are from the Merovingian period.

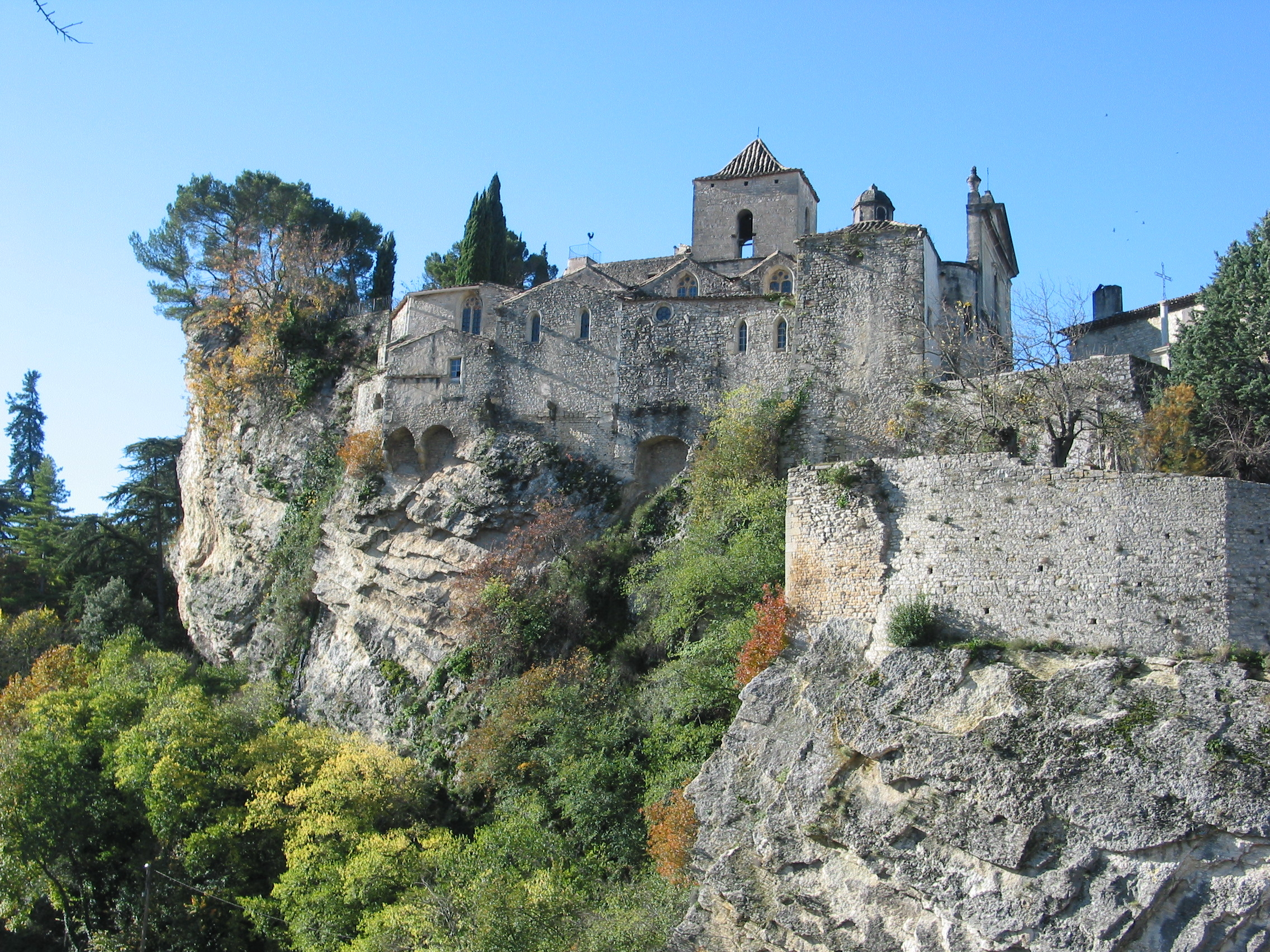
Former Vaison Cathedral (Sainte-Marie de l'Assomption)

The second former cathedral of Vaison is the Cathedral of the Assumption (French: Cathédrale Sainte-Marie-de-l'Assomption), also known as the Cathédrale de la Haute-Ville because of its location on top of the mount inside the city walls. It was built some centuries later than the other cathedral, for greater security in disturbed times.
