= Nicholas de Balmyle =

Roman Catholic bishop

- Bishop of Dunblane
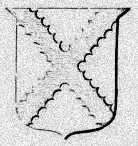
- The arms of the diocese of Dunblane (non-contemporary)
- Church: Roman Catholic Church
- See: Diocese of Dunblane
- In office: 1307–1319 × 1320
- Predecessor: Nicholas
- Successor: Roger de Balnebrich

Orders
- Consecration: 11 December 1307

Personal details
- Born: unknown unknown
- Died: 8 February 1319 × 30 January 1320

Nicholas de Balmyle (d. 1319 × 1320), also called Nicholas of St Andrews, was a Scottish administrator and prelate in the late 13th century and early 14th century. A graduate of an unknown university, he served his earliest years as a clergyman at St Andrews, moving on to hold churches in Lothian as well as deputising (as Official) to two archdeacons of Lothian.

In the late summer and in the autumn of 1296, between the death of Bishop William Fraser and the arrival of the new Bishop of St Andrews William de Lamberton, Nicholas was placed in charge of the diocese of St Andrews as Official. Nicholas thereafter can be found exercising a senior role in Scottish affairs, and by early 1301 he was Chancellor of Scotland. In his late 60s or (more probably) his 70s by this stage, Nicholas was an extremely old man, yet in 1307 he became Bishop of Dunblane. He held this position until his death in either 1319 or 1320.

== Background and early life ==
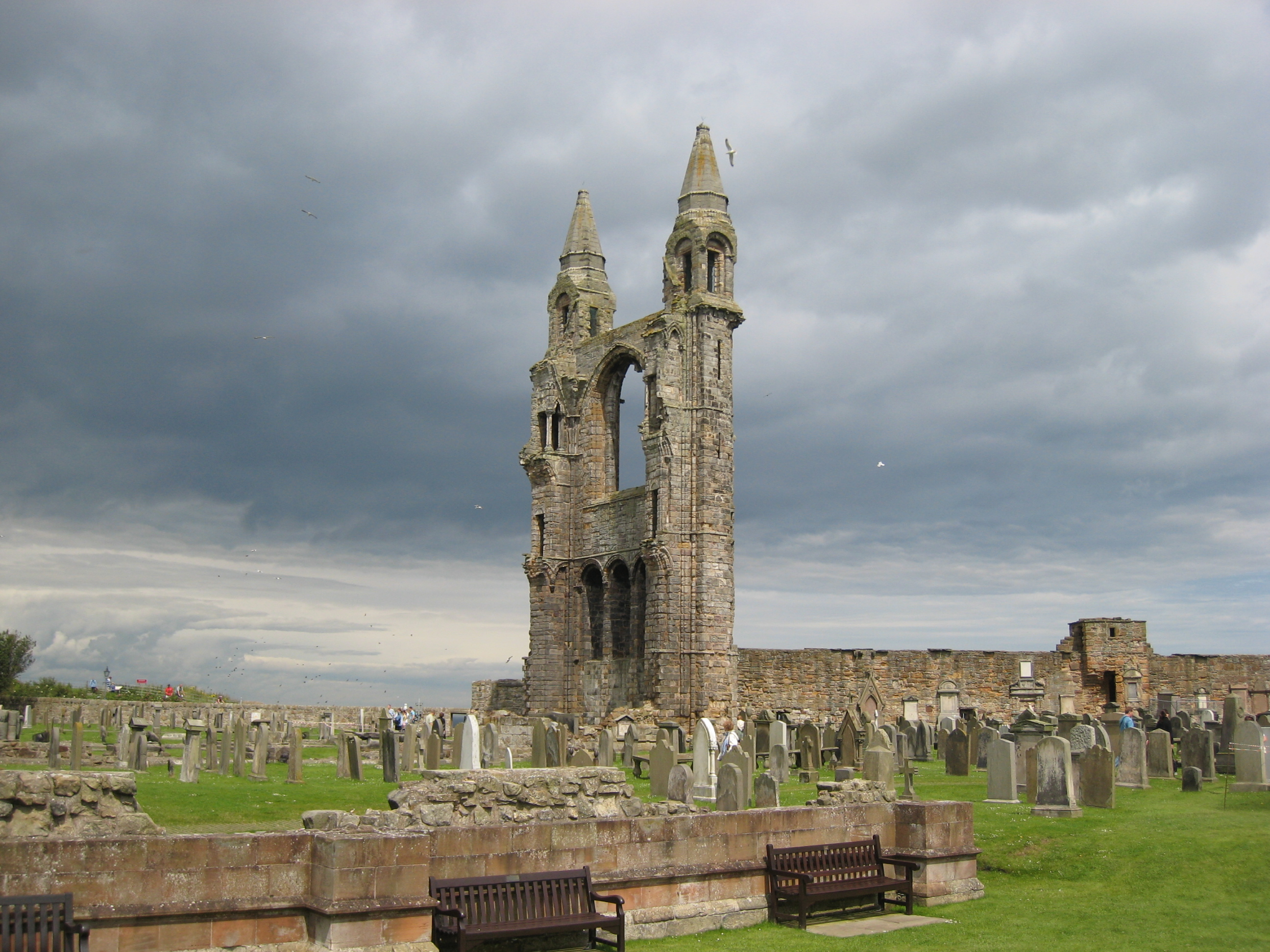
Modern ruins of St Andrews Cathedral. Although it is not known where Nicholas attended university, it is known that much of his early life was spent in and around this location.

It is highly unlikely that Nicholas was born later than the 1230s, as he was styled Magister by 1259, indicating that by that date he possessed a Master's degree. It was rare for someone under twenty years old or even older to have such a qualification in this period. The university or universities he attended are not known.

Until 1295, Nicholas was referred to as Nicholas of St Andrews (de Sancto Andrea), but in February of that year he began to be called de Balmyle, one source referring to him as de Balmyll dictus de Sancto Andrea (de Balmyle called de Sanctoandrea). It is probable that he adopted de Sancto Andrea when he finished training at St Andrews and went elsewhere, and that he dropped it in 1295 when he moved back.

Nicholas' apparent surname, de Balmyle, points to an association with Balmyle near Meigle, in the region where Gowrie and Angus border, though that is only one of two possible locations.

== Early career ==
As a graduate, Nicholas is first found active at St Andrews in the entourage of Gamelin, Bishop of St Andrews, in 1259. He does not appear very often in any witness lists during the following few decades, but does appear along with other St Andrews clerics witnessing a charter of William, Earl of Mar at Falkland on 21 January 1268.

He disappeared from the records until found as Official to the Archdeacon of Lothian (1283 × 1285). It is possible that during this period, he left Scotland for further study. The position of Official was held under the absentee Archdeacon of Lothian, Adam de Gullane, and afterwards, Archdeacon William Frere, and was probably held along with the post of vicar of Haddington; the latter he definitely held by 1295. Nicholas is found as Official in a document dating certainly between 1273 and 1285, a document which can probably be more precisely dated to between 1283 and 1285.

He was pastor of the church of Calder Comitis, Midlothian, by September 1296. Both churches were indirectly under the patronage of the Bishop of St Andrews, William Fraser. The rector of Haddington was St Andrews Cathedral Priory and although the church of Calder Comitis was normally under the patronage of the Mormaer of Fife, at that point in time the wardship of the young mormaer's lands was being held by the Bishop of St Andrews.

On 6 November 1292, he acted as a substitute auditor on behalf of John de Balliol at Berwick in the Great Cause. The latter was the legal process by which Edward I, King of the English, mediated the succession dispute to the Scottish throne, the result of which Balliol was selected by King Edward to be king on condition of open subordination.

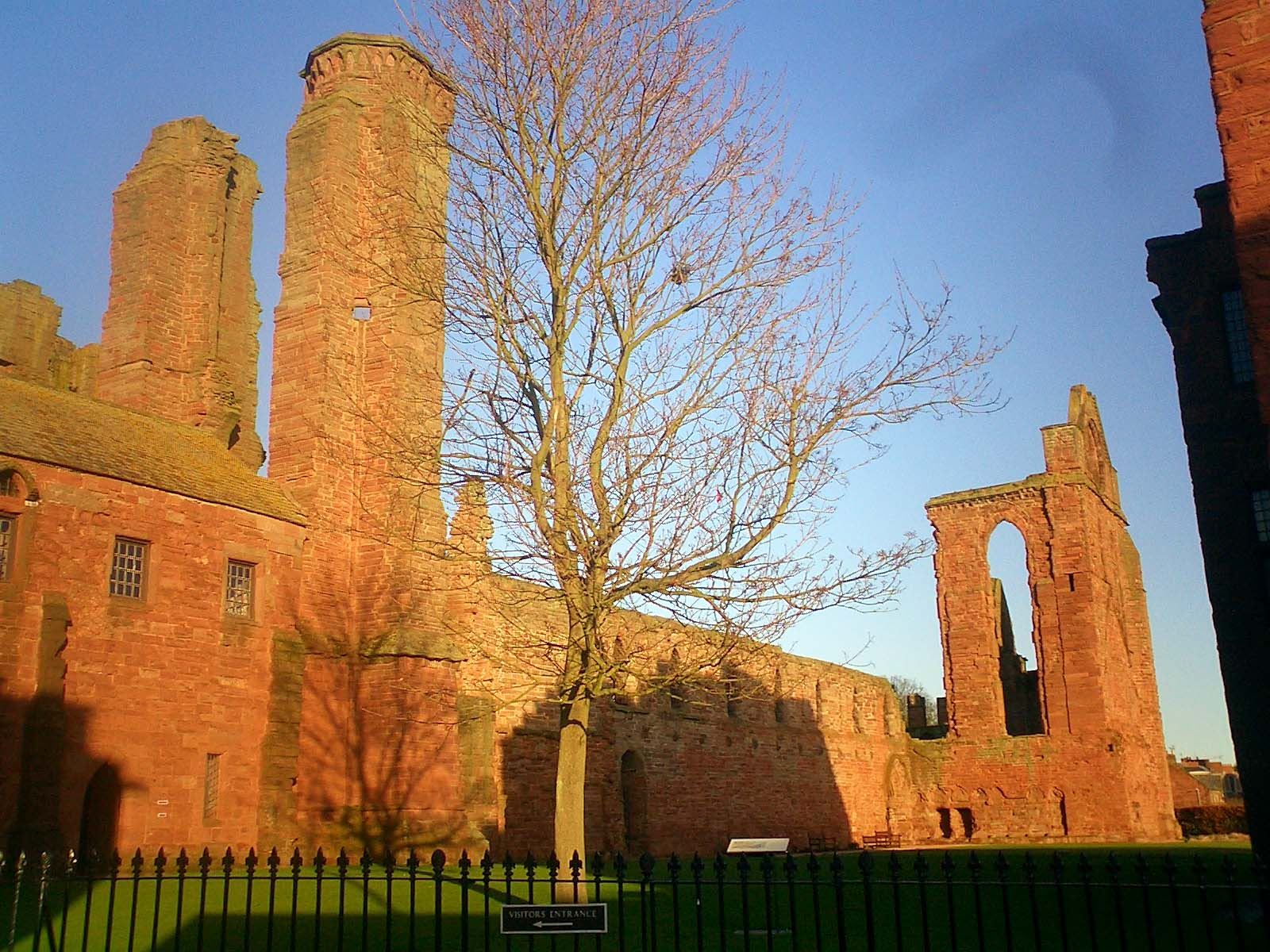
Arbroath Abbey in Angus, where Nicholas would have spent much of his time as Chancellor.

Nicholas attended King John's first parliament in February 1293 at Scone. He is found witnessing a charter at Newbattle Abbey on 20 November 1293, as Archdeacon William Frere's Official, and on 20 December is mentioned by Frere as a commissary of the Official of the diocese of St Andrews appointed to adjudicate on 4 January 1294, a case involving Kelso Abbey. He witnessed a charter along with Archdeacon Frere and Bishop William Fraser at Inchmurdo on 13 February 1295.

== Nicholas and the wars of Scottish independence ==
In 1296, the agreement that had followed from the Great Cause between King Edward I and the King of the Scots, John Balliol, broke down. King Edward resolved to depose King John, invading the kingdom and beginning the Wars of Scottish Independence. Nicholas, as pastor of Calder-Comitis, swore fealty to King Edward at Berwick on 28 August 1296. His lands were restored thereafter, on 2 September, Edward having notionally confiscated all the lands of the Scottish clergy earlier in the year pending homage.

In the following year, William Fraser, the Bishop of St Andrews, died, and it was Nicholas who was chosen to be Official of the diocese and to administer it during the vacancy. He performed this function until the return to Scotland from France of the new bishop, William de Lamberton.

After his return in August 1299, Lamberton was Guardian of Scotland and Nicholas became his close associate. Nicholas can be seen to have benefited as a result. He became Chancellor of Scotland by 30 January 1301. Balmyle's pension for being Chancellor was to be paid by Arbroath Abbey, for which the abbey later fell into arrears.

Later in the year, in April, he was one of four Scottish envoys sent to Canterbury for abortive talks with the English and French. In the next few years, Nicholas' activities are difficult to trace, but he was probably involved in much diplomatic activity, including perhaps having a hand in drawing up the brief which Baldred Bisset would later deliver to the pope in the interests of Scottish independence. It was probably in this time too that Nicholas became a clerk at Arbroath Abbey and perhaps a canon of Dunblane Cathedral.

Nicholas may have remained as Chancellor until 1305. His accession as Chancellor by 1301 corresponded with a renewed emphasis on the authority of King John in government documents. Becoming Chancellor by 1301, in the words of Geoffrey Barrow, meant that he became "one of the handful of key men who directed the national struggle".

== Episcopal election ==
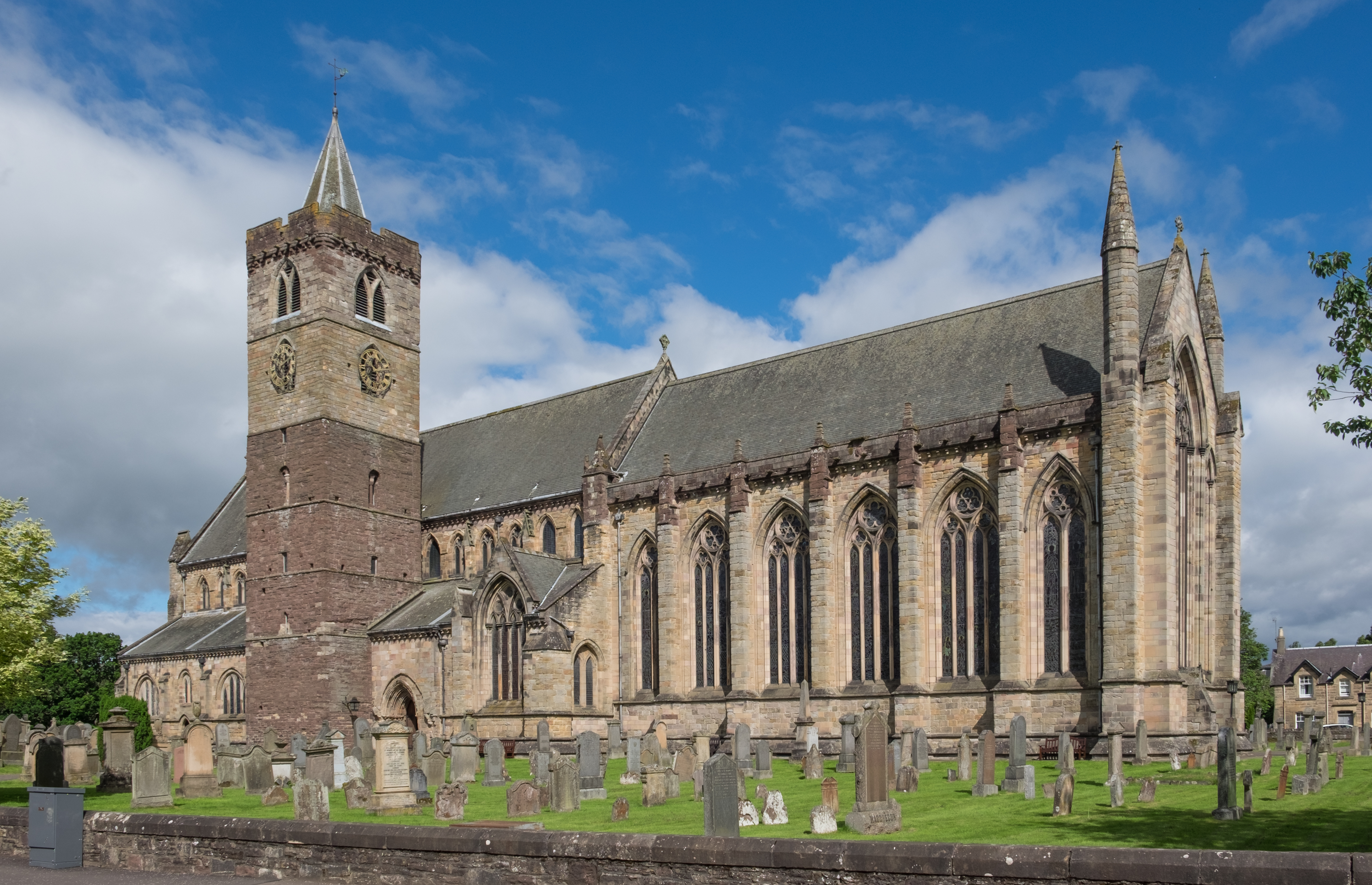
Dunblane Cathedral, the seat (cathedra) of Nicholas' bishopric, as it is today.

Following the death of his namesake Nicholas, Bishop of Dunblane (and former Abbot of Arbroath), Nicholas de Balmyle was among the canons of Dunblane with the responsibility of selecting a successor. Bishop Nicholas had died sometime between 1306 (after his last attestation on 26 January) and late 1307. The election was done by compromissarii (a short-list of canons delegated to perform election), with John, Abbot of Arbroath excluded from the vote, perhaps because of his known pro-English tendencies.

The seven compromissarii were the dean (name not known), Maurice, Abbot of Inchaffray, William, Abbot of Lindores, Michael, Abbot of Cambuskenneth, William de Eaglesham, Henry de Stirling, and Nicholas de Balmyle. They were instructed to elect from among themselves, and their decision was the promotion of Nicholas de Balmyle. Nicholas, Bishop-elect of Dunblane, travelled to the Apostolic See along with proctors of the cathedral chapter. After the election was confirmed by Pope Clement V, Nicholas was consecrated by Nicholas, Cardinal-Bishop of Ostia at Poitiers on 11 December 1307.

It was Geoffrey Barrow's belief, supported by Donald Watt, that their decision was the result of pressure from the new Scottish king, Robert de Brus, who may have valued Balmyle's experience and trusted his political record. The usual secular patron of the diocese was the Earl of Strathearn, but Malise III, Earl of Strathearn was at that stage a prisoner-exile at Rochester in England, thus allowing Robert to take his place.

== Bishop of Dunblane ==
When Nicholas returned to Scotland, and the exact nature of his activities over the next few years, remain unclear matters. His episcopal rank makes it likely that he attended the parliaments and took part in the affairs of the kingdom during the early years of his episcopate, but direct proof is lacking.

He witnessed a charter of Cambuskenneth Abbey along with John de Kininmund, Bishop of Brechin, on 12 September 1311. He is found witnessing many ecclesiastical and royal documents through 1312, 1313 and beyond. He witnessed royal acts at Inchture and Dundee in April 1312, at Ayr on 27 May 1315, at Edinburgh on 9 March 1317, at Scone on 14 June that year, at Melrose on 24 July 1317, again at Scone on 3 December 1318 and at Arbroath on 8 February 1319.

On 6 October 1312, he came to an agreement with Bernard, Abbot of Arbroath, which resolved Nicholas' complaints concerning the non-payment of his pension as well as more official disputes between the bishopric of Dunblane and the abbey. In the following year he was in a dispute with Dunfermline Abbey regarding the church of Logie-Atheron in Stirlingshire, a dispute which was never resolved during Nicholas' episcopate.

On 9 May 1315, he is found at Perth assisting William de Sinclair, Bishop of Dunkeld, in a judgment regarding Donnchadh de Strathearn. On 27 March 1318 he was named as papal mandatory to oversee the provision of the Italian Robert Barducii of Florence to the deanery of Glasgow Cathedral.

It is not known exactly when Bishop Nicholas died. The see of Dunblane is first known to have been vacant on 30 January 1320 and Bishop Nicholas' last appearance in the records was witnessing a charter of Coupar Angus Abbey at Arbroath on 8 February 1319: his death therefore fell between these two points.

== Notes ==
Government offices
Preceded by Alexander Kennedy (?)	Chancellor of Scotland × 1301–1306 × 1308	Succeeded by Bernard
Religious titles
Preceded by Nicholas	Bishop of Dunblane; 1307–1319 × 1320	Succeeded by Roger de Balnebrich
