= Bishop of Dunblane =

Medieval Scottish bishopric

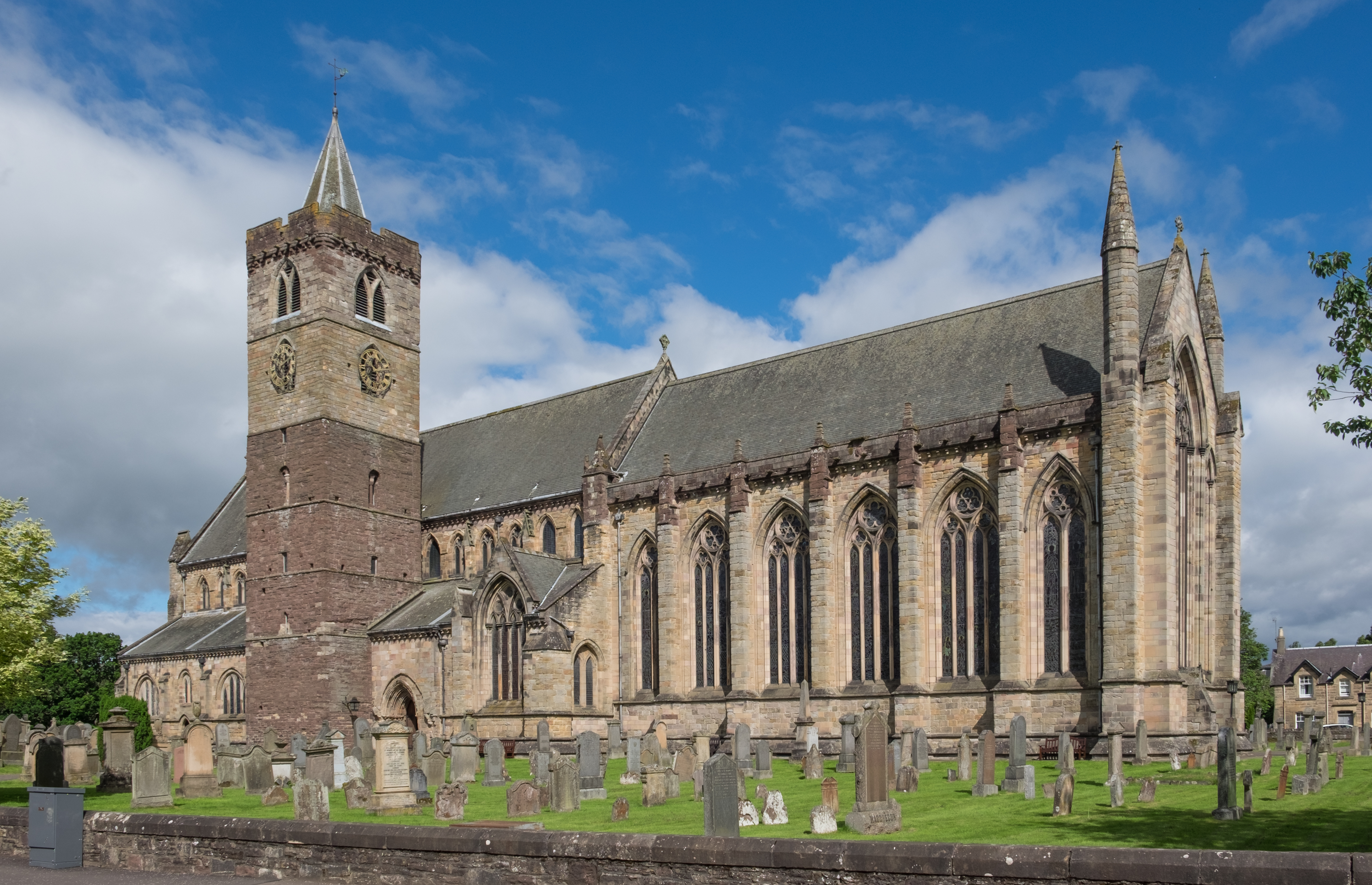
Dunblane Cathedral, seat (cathedra) of the bishops.

The Bishop of Dunblane or Bishop of Strathearn was the ecclesiastical head of the Diocese of Dunblane or Strathearn, one of medieval Scotland's thirteen bishoprics. It was based at Dunblane Cathedral, now a parish church of the Church of Scotland. The bishopric itself certainly derives from an older Gaelic Christian community. According to legend, the Christian community of Dunblane was derived from the mission of St. Bláán, a saint originally associated with the monastery of Cenn Garath (Kingarth) on the Isle of Bute. Although the bishopric had its origins in the 1150s or before, the cathedral was not built nor was the seat (cathedra) of the diocese fixed at Dunblane until the episcopate of Clement.

The Bishopric's links with Rome ceased to exist after the Scottish Reformation, but continued, saving temporary abolition between 1638 and 1661, under the episcopal Church of Scotland until the Revolution of 1688. Episcopacy in the established church in Scotland was permanently abolished in 1689 but later continued in the (unofficial) Episcopal Church of Scotland.

== List of bishops of Dunblane ==
=== Pre-Reformation bishops ===
Pre-Reformation Bishops of Dunblane
Tenure	Incumbent	Notes
fl. 1155	M. de Dunblan	
1155 x 1161-1165 x 1178	Laurence of Dunblane	
1168 x 1178–1194 x 1198	Simon of Dunblane	
1195 x 1198-1210	Jonathan of Dunblane	
1210 x 1214–1220 x 1225	Abraham of Strathearn	
1223 x 1225-1226	Radulf (bishop-elect)	Elect only.
1226 x 1227-1231	Osbert of Dunblane	
1233-1258	Clement of Dunblane	
1258 x 1259-1284	Robert de Prebenda	
1284-1291 x 1296	William	
1295 x 1296-1300 x 1301	Alpín of Strathearn	
1301-1306 x 1307	Nicholas of Arbroath	Nicholas was previously Abbot of Arbroath.
1307-1319 x 1320	Nicholas de Balmyle	
1295 x 1296-1300 x 1301	Richard de Pontefract	Nominated by Edward I of England to Papacy. Nomination unsuccessful.
1319 x 1322	Roger de Balnebrich	The cathedral chapter was divided on the successor of Nicolas de Balmyle; a long litigation between Roger and Maurice, Abbot of Inchaffray, took place at the Papal court, which resulted in the consecration of Maurice.
1319 x 1322-1347	Maurice of Inchaffray	Previously Abbot of Inchaffray.
1347-1361	William de Cambuslang	
1361-1371 x 1372	Walter de Coventre	
1372-1373	Andrew Magnus	
1380-1403	Dúghall of Lorne	
1403-1419	Fionnlagh MacCailein	
1419-1428 x 1429	William Stephani	Previously Bishop of Orkney.
1429-1446	Michael Ochiltree	
1446 x 1447	Walter Stewart	Elected, but not conferred.
1447-1466	Robert Lauder	Papal Nuncio.
1466-1485 x 1487	John Herspolz or Hepburn	
1487-1526	James Chisholm	Resigned title but not fruits, and kept a right of return to bishopric. He died in late 1545 or early 1546.
1526-1564	William Chisholm (uncle)	
1564-1569	William Chisholm (nephew)	Coadjutor since 1561. Deposed in 1569. Rehabilitated as bishop between 18 March 1587, and 27 May 1589, when the rehabilitation was annulled.

=== Church of Scotland bishops ===
Church of Scotland Bishops of Dunblane
Tenure	Incumbent	Notes
1573 x 1575-1603	Andrew Graham	
1603-1615	George Graham	Translated to Bishoric of Orkney.
1615-1635	Adam Bellenden	Translated to Bishoric of Aberdeen.
1636-1638	James Wedderburn	13 December 1638, episcopacy outlawed in Scotland and all bishops deprived of their sees. He died in 1649. Episcopacy was reintroduced at the Restoration of 1661.
1661-1671	Robert Leighton	Became Archbishop of Glasgow in October 1671.
1673-1684	James Ramsay	Translated to the Bishopric of Ross, April 1684.
1684-1689	Robert Douglas	Translated from Brechin; deprived of the temporalities in 1689 when episcopacy was permanently abolished in the Church of Scotland following the Glorious Revolution.

=== Scottish Episcopal bishops ===
Scottish Episcopal Bishops of Dunblane
Tenure	Incumbent	Notes
1689–1716	Robert Douglas	Formerly Church of Scotland bishop, continued as an Episcopalian until his death on 22 April 1716
1716–1731	See vacant	
1731–1735	John Gillan	Consecrated as a college bishop in 1727; died 3 January 1735
1735–1743	Robert White	Translated to Fife in 1743
1743–1774	See administered by John Alexander, Bishop of Dunkeld	
1774–1791	Charles Rose	Also Bishop of Dunkeld 1776–86; died April 1791.
1791–1808	See vacant	
1808–1837	Patrick Torry	Consecrated as Bishop of Dunkeld and Dunblane; became Bishop of Fife, Dunkeld and Dunblane in 1837, and subsequently Bishop of St Andrews, Dunkeld and Dunblane in 1844.
The Scottish Episcopal see became part of the Diocese of Fife, Dunkeld and Dunblane in 1837, which was renamed the Diocese of St Andrews, Dunkeld and Dunblane in 1844.

=== Catholic titular bishops ===
In the Post-Reformation Roman Catholic church in Scotland, Dunblane is under the Roman Catholic Bishop of Dunkeld

Catholic Titular Bishops of Strathearn
Tenure	Incumbent	Notes
1974–1977	Hubertus Brandenburg	Also Auxiliary Bishop of Osnabrück. Translated to Bishop of Stockholm on 21 November 1977. Died on 4 November 2009
1979–2011	John Peter Jukes, O.F.M.Conv.	Also Auxiliary Bishop of Southwark. Died on 21 December 2011
2012–2013	Sébastien Muyengo Mulombe	Also Auxiliary Bishop of Kinshasa. Translated to Bishop of Uvira on 15 October 2013
2017–present	Timothy Edward Freyer	Also Auxiliary Bishop of Orange.

== See also ==
- Diocese of Dunblane
