= Roger de Balnebrich =

Scottish churchman

- Bishop of Dunblane
- Church: Roman Catholic Church
- See: Diocese of Dunblane
- In office: 1319 × 1322 (elect only)
- Predecessor: Nicholas de Balmyle
- Successor: Maurice

Orders
- Consecration: failed

Personal details
- Born: unknown unknown
- Died: unknown

Roger de Balnebrich [de Balnebrech, de Balnebriech, de Ballinbreth] was a 14th-century Scottish churchman. Roger received a university education, being styled Magister ("Master") by August 1313, though it is not known where he took his degree; the degree, however, was almost certainly done in canon law. His name derives either from Ballinbreich in Fife or Balnabriech, in Brechin, Angus.

== Biography ==
=== Canon lawyer ===
Roger was an active canon lawyer in the diocese of St Andrews. He was holding the parish church at Blairgowrie in the diocese of St Andrews, a church in the gift of the Bishop of St Andrews, on 13 November 1313. It was on that date that he was granted a pension by Arbroath Abbey for the services he had provided them.

He can be found on 3 August 1313, acting as a proctor for Henry Man, Abbot of Scone, before a hearing of two commissaries at St Andrews. He is found among a number of appointed arbiters settlings a dispute between Dunfermline Abbey and two residents of the Fithkil barony in Fife, though when that hearing met on 13 March 1320, Roger was not recorded as being present.

=== Elect of Dunblane ===
Sometime between 8 February 1319, the date at which Bishop Nicholas de Balmyle is last attested, and 5 March 1322, Roger was one of two different candidates elected by that cathedral chapter to succeed Nicholas as Bishop of Dunblane.

Litigation took place at the papal curia, in which Roger's rival Maurice, Abbot of Inchaffray, emerged victorious; Roger did not receive provision or consecration, and had resigned his claims before 5 March, when Maurice received papal provision. The sources say that by this point in time Roger was rector of Forteviot.

=== Roger, Bishop of Ross ===
Roger may have disappeared from the records after that, though this is now doubtful. Professor Donald Watt has argued that Roger de Balnebrich is the same as Roger, Bishop of Ross from 1325 until 1350, and who Watt suggests had remained at the papal curia for three years until provided to Ross.

This Roger was said to have been a canon of Abernethy, which did lie in the diocese of Dunblane. Unfortunately, as Professor Watt acknowledged, because the scarce evidence has not as yet given Roger, as Bishop of Ross, a surname, and because it has not yielded any direct statement on the matter, it cannot be proven that Roger de Balnebrich and Roger (Bishop of Ross) were one and the same person.

== Notes ==
Religious titles
Preceded by Nicholas de Balmyle	Bishop of Dunblane; 1319 × 1322 (elect only)	Succeeded by Maurice
