= Nicholas of Arbroath =

Nicholas
- Bishop of Dunblane
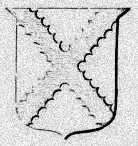
- The arms of the diocese of Dunblane (non-contemporary)
- Church: Roman Catholic Church
- See: Diocese of Dunblane
- In office: 1301–1306 × 1307
- Predecessor: Alpín
- Successor: Nicholas de Balmyle
- Previous post(s): Abbot of Arbroath (1296 × 1299–1301)

Orders
- Consecration: 13 November 1301

Personal details
- Born: unknown, 13th century unknown
- Died: 26 January 1306 × 11 December 1307

Nicholas O. Tiron (died 1306 × 1307), Abbot of Arbroath and Bishop of Dunblane, was a late 13th-century and early 14th-century churchman in the Kingdom of Scotland. Little is known about Nicholas until he appeared on 21 November 1299, holding the position of Abbot of Arbroath in a charter of that abbey; the last attestation of his predecessor Henry can be dated to 16 October 1296, so that Nicholas must have become abbot sometime in between these two dates.

As Abbot of Arbroath, he was a canon of Dunblane Cathedral, and entitled to participate in episcopal elections. Bishop Alpín had died sometime between 1 October 1299 and 15 October 1301, and the new election to the bishopric became deadlocked.

Several canons had emerged as candidates, and it seems to have been decided that all candidates should proceed to the papal see to request judgment from the Pope. As it happened, Abbot Nicholas was the only candidate to travel to the papacy; as Cockburn commented, "An abbot could face the heavy expense; no poor canon of the Cathedral could". When no other turned up, the Pope authorised Nicholas' provision, and he was consecrated by Theodoric, Bishop of Palestrina, on 13 November 1301.

Nicholas' short career as bishop is not well recorded. In the events of the early Wars of Scottish Independence, Nicholas' role is unclear and aside from some appearances in the charters of Coupar Angus Abbey, his name is largely absent from the evidence. He appears for the last time, in papal documents, on 26 January 1306 and was dead a good time before 11 December 1307, when his successor Nicholas de Balmyle was consecrated as bishop in France.

== Notes ==
Religious titles
Preceded by Henry	Abbot of Arbroath; 1296 × 1299–1301	Succeeded by John de Angus
Preceded by Alpín	Bishop of Dunblane; 1301–1306 × 1307	Succeeded by Nicholas de Balmyle
