= Robert de Prebenda =

Robert de Prebenda (also known as Robert de la Provendir; died 1284) was a 13th-century Anglo-French cleric who was a Bishop of Dunblane, Scotland.

He was the son of Geoffrey de Rotyngton (Ruddington), a minor land-owner in Nottinghamshire. By 1255, he was Dean of Dunblane, probably brought in by Bishop Clement. He held a canonries in the bishopric of Glasgow and in the bishopric of Dunkeld, which later got him in trouble with Pope Urban IV. He was bishop-elect of Dunblane by 2 January 1259. His consecration was delayed because he was in Rome attempting to gain the more prestigious bishopric of Glasgow by opposing the election of Nicholas de Moffat. In this he evidently failed, and was consecrated as Bishop of Dunblane sometime between 22 August 1259 and 1 September 1260.

Although Robert spent much time in England, he tried to continue the attempts of his predecessor Clement to reinvigorate the bishopric of Dunblane. He attended the Second Council of Lyon in 1274. He was once appointed a papal judge-delegate in 1275, and twice served as an ambassador for King Alexander III of Scotland in England (both in 1279). Robert was alive on 5 February 1284, but was dead by 18 December. He was succeeded by William, Abbot of Arbroath.

Religious titles
Preceded by Clement	Bishop of Dunblane; 1259–1284	Succeeded by William
