= Alpín of Strathearn =

Alpín of Strathearn was late 13th century Scottish prelate and graduate of the University of Bologna. The description of him as being of "noble birth" and his appellation de Stratherne indicate he was probably from the kin-group of the mormaers of Strathearn. His date of birth is not known, but he appeared in Bologna, where there was a university, in 1278, described as dominus (knight) and Archdeacon of St Andrews, and by 1287 he is styled magister, indicating the completion of a university degree. He had probably been an Archdeacon since 1273, but had resigned this sometime before 4 August 1279. He became a canon of Dunblane Cathedral, certainly by 1287 when he is back in Scotland.

He acted as an official of St Andrews in the early 1290s, supported the accession of John Balliol after the Great Cause and took a role in his government. As a canon of Dunblane he was elected Bishop of Dunblane by compromissarii sometime after 4 May 1295. He was consecrated at Rome on 16 October 1296. His absence from the country at this time allowed him to escape paying direct homage to King Edward I of England, who deposed King John in this year and imposed direct rule on Scotland by the English crown. His activities after this are unclear. He is not known directly to have returned to Scotland, but is known to have paid money to the papal chamber in 1299. The latter is the last act which can be traced from him. His death date is unknown specifically, but probably did take place before 15 October 1301, because by which time his successor Nicholas was acting as bishop-elect.

Religious titles
Preceded by William Wishart	Archdeacon of St Andrews; 1273 x 1278–1278 x 1279	Succeeded by Gregory
Preceded by William	Bishop of Dunblane; 1295 x 1296–1299 x 1301	Succeeded by Nicholas
