= St Blane's Church, Dunblane =

Church in Dunblane, Scotland

Coordinates: 56.189°N 3.963°W

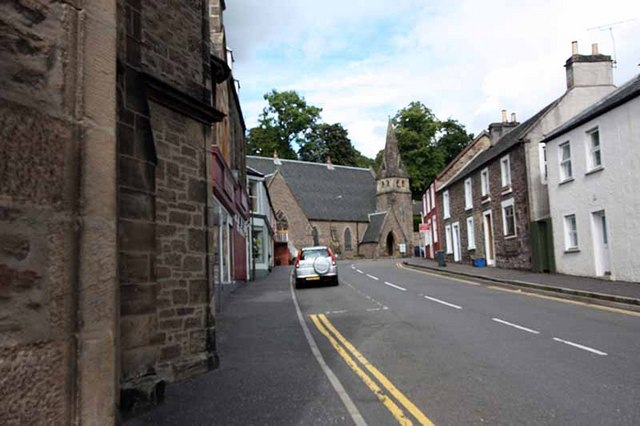
St Blane's Church

St Blane's is a Church of Scotland church located in Dunblane, Scotland. The evangelical congregation is within the Church of Scotland's Presbytery of Stirling. The Gothic Revival church building opened in 1854 as the Free Church and is now a category B listed building.

== History ==
The congregation of St Blane's has its origins in the controversies which bedevilled the Church of Scotland in the 18th and 19th centuries, controversies centring more, perhaps, on the rights of members in the appointment of ministers than on any theological differences.

A first congregation of Seceders was formally established in Dunblane 1758 and built its first meeting house in what is now the Haining. Initially linked with another congregation in Doune, it grew sufficiently to become a separate entity in 1766. It had successive name changes, from Associate to First Associate Burgher to United Secession and then United Presbyterian before becoming Leighton United Free Church of Scotland in 1900. Meanwhile, in 1836 the original meeting house was rebuilt on the same site in the Haining. Remarkably, the congregation only had three ministers over these 134 years, Rev. Michael Gilfillan from 1768 to 1816, Rev. James Anderson from 1818 to 1854 and Rev. William Blair from 1856 onwards.

The 18th century secessions in the Church of Scotland had been gradual affairs, both at the national and the local level. Typically a small number of members would secede from the parish church and slowly build up until a viable congregation could be formed, capable of supporting a minister. By contrast the Disruption of 1843 was an explosive affair in the aftermath of the 1843 General Assembly when, in many instances, the minister and a majority of the parish church congregation broke away to form a new congregation of the Free Church of Scotland. In Dunblane the minister of the Parish Church, Rev. William MacKenzie, and eight of the nine elders on the Kirk Session came out to set up such a congregation. By October 1843 a new church, seating 521, had been built and was packed on the opening Sunday. For some reason, however, it was soon found to be unsatisfactory. There is no surviving record of what was wrong, but in 1854 a second church was built across the street from the first one. This eventually became St Blane's Church, the old one now being converted into private houses. When the United Presbyterian and Free Churches joined to become the United Free Church of Scotland in 1900 the congregation's name became Dunblane East United Free Church.

The union of the Church of Scotland and the United Free Church in 1929 therefore resulted in there being three congregations of the same denomination in Dunblane, the Cathedral, the Leighton and the East. There had been brief talks about uniting the Leighton and East congregations and these were continued with increasing intensity until in 1952 the two congregations united to form St Blane's. The East Church became the home of the new congregation. The Leighton Church, after being empty for several years, was turned into a dwelling house, part of the Scottish Churches House complex.

Unions of congregations can often be difficult but this was not the case in Dunblane. Within ten years the identity of St Blane's was firmly established and the housing boom which began in the 1960s led to an influx of members. Dunblane Cathedral and St Blane's complement each other, the two buildings being radically different and offering, within the framework of the Presbyterian style of worship, a different ambiance.

== Activities ==
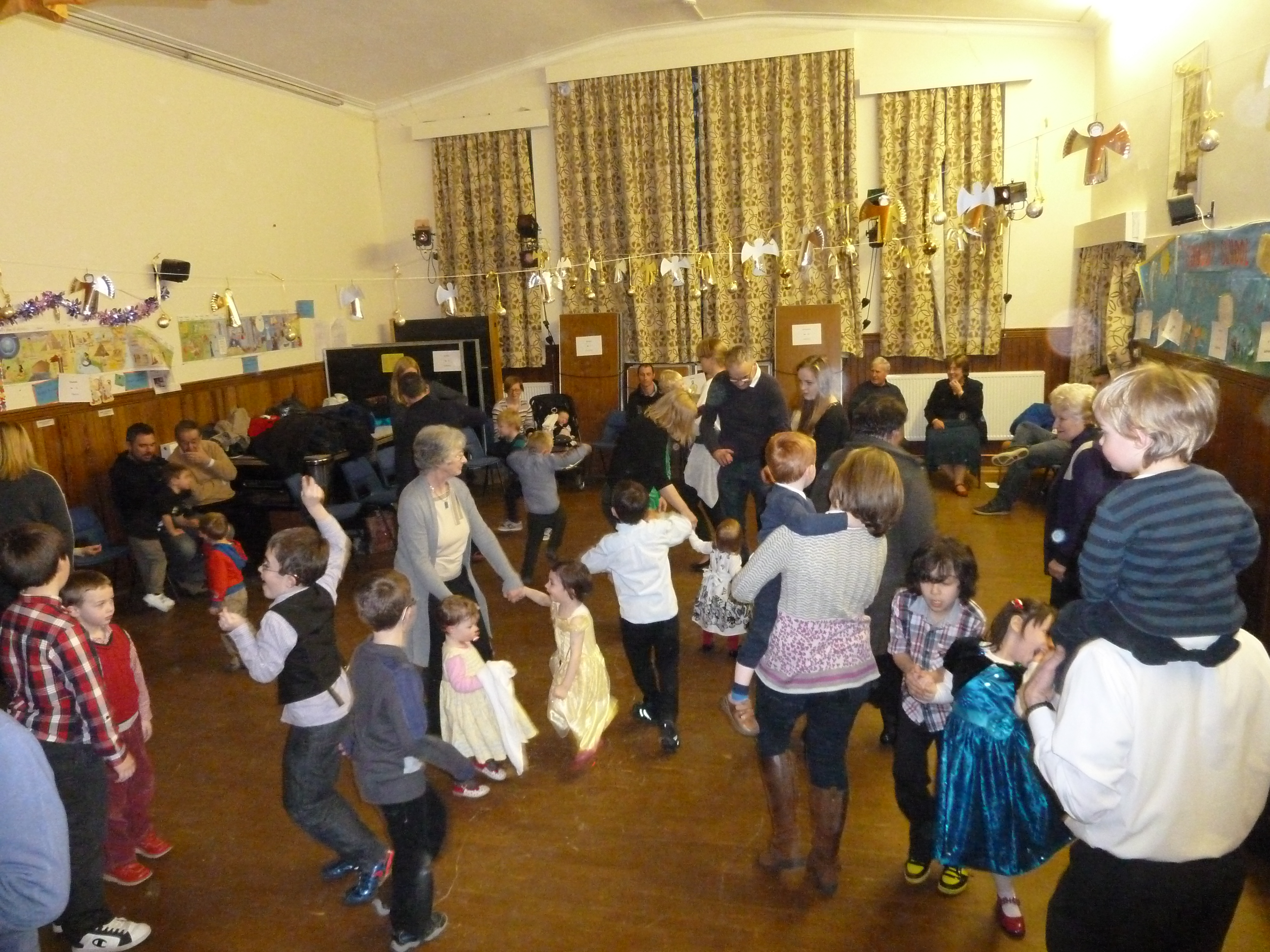
Sunday School Christmas Party

On a Sunday morning there is a family service at 10:00am with an active Sunday School and Creche. The evening service and prayer meeting is at 6:30pm. During the week the church plays host to a variety of organisations including the Boys' Brigade, Girls' Brigade and Church of Scotland Guild. Home bible study groups run throughout the year, with Alpha Courses being run intermittently.

== See also ==
- List of Church of Scotland parishes
