= Blaan (disambiguation) =

The Blaan people are a Philippine tribe.

Blaan may also refer to:

- Saint Blane, Irish saint
- Blaan language
