= Inchcape =

Reef off the east coast of Angus, Scotland

- Reef
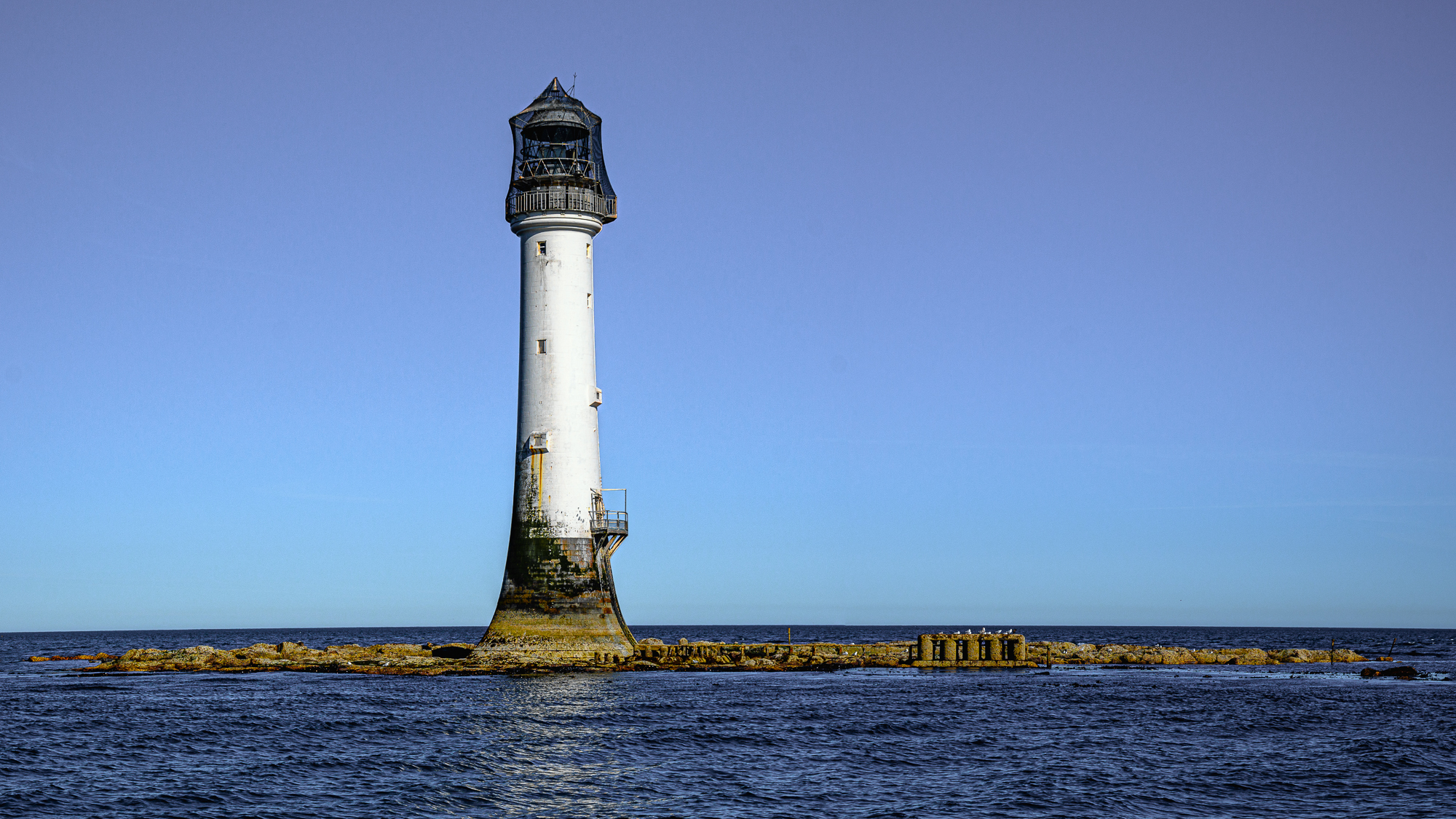
- The reef at low water

- Location in Scotland
- Coordinates: 56°26.052′N 2°23.236′W

Inchcape or the Bell Rock is a reef about 11 miles (18 km) off the east coast of Angus, Scotland, near Dundee and Fife, occupied by the Bell Rock Lighthouse. The name Inchcape comes from the Scottish Gaelic Innis Sgeap, meaning "beehive isle", probably comparing the shape of the reef to old-style skep beehives. According to legend, the alternative name Bell Rock derives from a 14th-century attempt by the Abbot of Arbroath to install a warning bell on the reef; the bell was removed by a Dutch pirate who perished a year later on the rocks, a story that is immortalised in "The Inchcape Rock" (1802), a poem by Robert Southey.

The main hazard the reef presents to shipping is that only a relatively small proportion of it is above water, but a large section of the surrounding area is extremely shallow and dangerous. HMS Argyll ran aground there in 1915.

The rock was featured in a one-hour episode of the BBC's Seven Wonders of the Industrial World, which told the story of the Bell Rock Lighthouse's construction. Work began in 1807 and was largely completed by 1810.

== Geology ==
Inchcape is formed of the Old Red Sandstone exposed in the nearby coastal areas, and of which Arbroath Abbey is built. The main body of the rock is about 427 feet (130 m) long and 230 feet (70 m) wide, but the south-western part extends for another 1,000 ft (300 m) or so. Robert Stevenson, the engineer who designed and built the lighthouse on the rock, estimated that the "greatest length, therefore, of the Bell Rock, which may be said to be dangerous to shipping, is about 1427 feet (435m), and its greatest breadth is about 300 feet (91.4m)."

== See also ==
- List of outlying islands of Scotland
