= Jonathan of Dunblane =

Jonathan
- Bishop of Dunblane
- Church: Roman Catholic Church
- See: Diocese of Dunblane
- In office: 1195 × 1198–1210
- Predecessor: Simon
- Successor: Abraham
- Previous post(s): Archdeacon of Dunblane (1171 × 1191–1198)

Orders
- Consecration: unknown

Personal details
- Born: unknown unknown
- Died: 1210

Jonathan (died c. 1210) was a churchman and prelate active in late twelfth- and early thirteenth century Strathearn, in the Kingdom of Scotland. He was the Bishop of Dunblane during the time of Gille Brigte of Strathearn, and it was during Jonathan's episcopate that Gille Brigte founded an Augustinian priory at Inchaffray.

== Archdeacon & bishop ==
There was a Jonathan as Archdeacon of Dunblane found in three documents in the later 12th century, documents dating 1178 × 1197, 1191 × 1194 and 1195 × 1198 respectively; an Archdeacon Andrew is attested in the office in a charter of Cambuskenneth Abbey datable to 1165 × 1171, while a successor (John) is attested holding the office of archdeacon 1195 × 1199.

It was almost certainly Archdeacon Jonathan who in became Bishop of Strathearn or Dunblane sometime between 1195 and 1198. The date comes from the fact that he witnessed a charter also witnessed by Gilla Christ, the son of the Earl of Strathearn who died in 1198. He witnessed another charter before 1199, one also witnessed by Matthew (died 1199), Bishop of Aberdeen.

== Foundation of Inchaffray ==
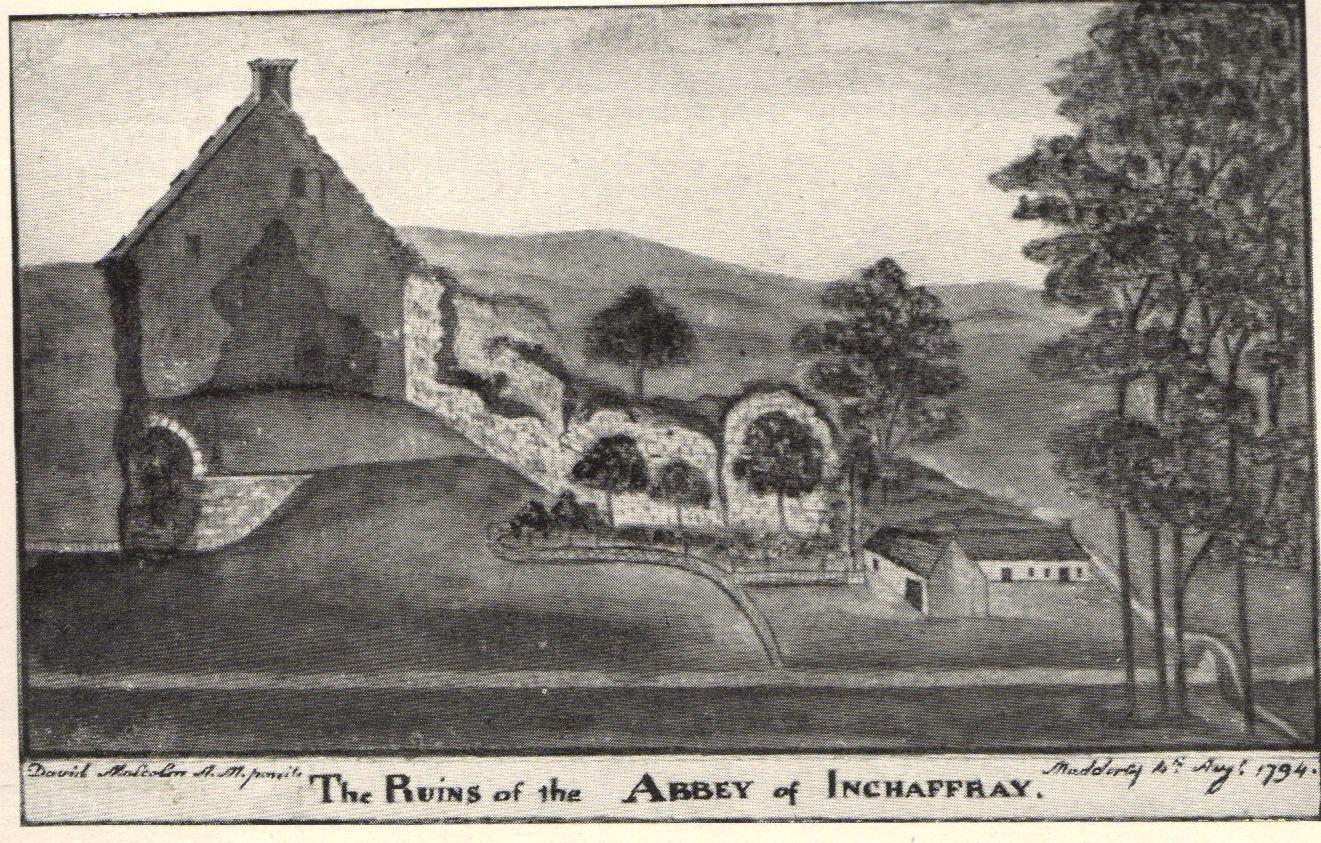
Ruins of the abbey of Inchaffray as depicted in 1794, long after it had gone into ruins. Inchaffray Priory had been promoted to the rank of Abbey in 1221, eleven years after Bishop Jonathan's death.

His episcopate fell entirely in the reign of Gille Brigte, the mormaer ("earl") or ruler of the province of Strathearn; Jonathan was also the bishop whose episcopate saw the foundation of the Priory of Inchaffray, c. 1200, which took a large proportion of the diocese of Dunblane's churches (and hence revenue) out of the bishopric's control.

In the 1440s, Walter Bower wrote in his Scotichronicon that Gille Brígte:

Divided his earldom into three equal portions. One he gave to the church and bishop of Dunblane, the second to St John the Evangelist and the canons of Inchaffray, the third he kept for himself and his own needs.

Despite the loss as perceived generations later, Bishop Jonathan witnessed the foundation charter of the new monastic house. Moreover, Bishop Jonathan issued his own confirmation of the foundation, expressing his joy at the piety of the mormaer, and declared that

locus quo uocator lingua scottica Inche affren ad exercitum sancti religionis in perpetuam deputetur que secundum sancti augustini regulam inuiolabiliter obseruetur.	"the place called in the Gaelic language Inche Affren is assigned forever to the exercise of religion according to the rule of St Augustine".

In encouraging the foundation of this monastic house, he was merely following the wishes of his secular patron as well as the actions of his predecessor Simon, who had given the house there its first endowment. Cynthia Neville thought that Jonathan may even have pushed for the foundation of an Augustinian house at this location, in an effort to reform the older Scottish church there.

== Remaining episcopate ==
Jonathan witnessed a charter of Lindores Abbey with Roger de Beaumont (died 1202), Bishop of St Andrews. In 1203, Jonathan acted as a papal judge-delegate along with the Bishop of Dunkeld, in order to resolve a dispute between the Abbot of Dunfermline and the Abbot of Cambuskenneth over the teinds of the church of Eccles (St Ninians, Stirling); the matter was not resolved in Jonathan's consistorial court, and it was committed to five papal mandatories.

The Scotichronicon of Walter Bower claimed that he died in 1210. He was buried at Inchaffray Abbey.

== Notes ==
Religious titles
Preceded by Andrew	Archdeacon of Dunblane/Muthill; 1171 × 1191–1198	Succeeded by John
Preceded by Simon	Bishop of Dunblane; 1195 × 1198–1210	Succeeded by Abraham
