= The Inchcape Rock =

1802 ballad by Robert Southey

"The Inchcape Rock" is a ballad written by English poet Robert Southey. Published in 1802, it tells the story of a 14th-century attempt by the Abbot of Arbroath ("Aberbrothock") to install a warning bell on Inchcape, a notorious sandstone reef about 11 miles (18 km) off the east coast of Scotland. The poem tells how the bell was removed by a pirate, who subsequently perished on the reef while returning to Scotland in bad weather some time later.

Like many of Southey's ballads "The Inchcape Rock" describes a supernatural event, but its basic theme is that those who do bad things will ultimately be punished accordingly and poetic justice done.

== Biographical background and publication ==
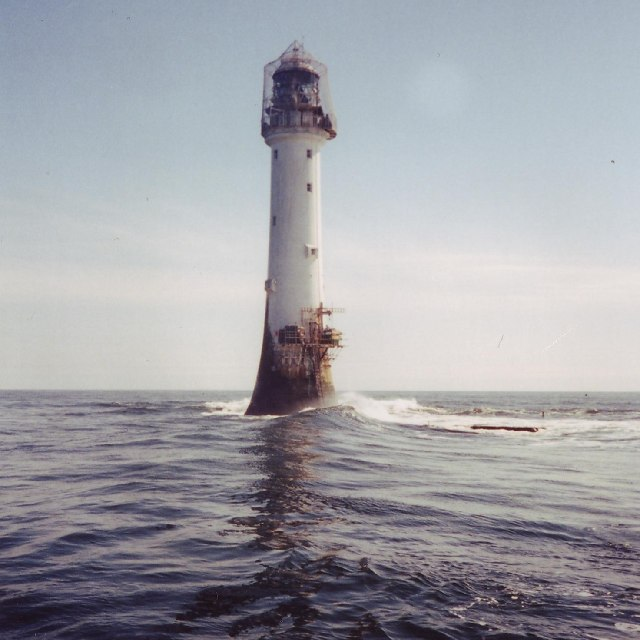
Bell Rock Lighthouse was built on the Inchcape reef in the early 19th century, and is named after the legend of the abbot's bell

Southey wrote the poem between 1796 and 1798 for The Morning Post, but it was not published until 1802. His inspiration was the legend of a pirate who removed a bell on Inchcape placed there by the Abbot of Arbroath to warn mariners of the reef. The poem was reprinted in the Edinburgh Annual Register for 1810, published in 1812. In a letter to his maternal uncle Herbert Hill, dated 16 August 1812, Southey tells how "The Inchcape Rock" had "lain uncorrected among my papers for the last ten years", until "some unknown person ... thought proper to touch [it] up & transmit [it] for insertion".

In December 1804 HMS York (1796) was wrecked on the rock, and lost with all hands, so its constant danger was newsworthy at that time.

The poem is included in the third volume of Southey's The Poetical Works of Robert Southey (1823), volume 3, where it is prefaced by a quotation from John Stoddart's Remarks on Local Scenery and Manners in Scotland (1801), which begins "An old writer mentions a curious tradition that may be worth quoting" before going on to the relate the tale. Southey added a footnote suggesting that his own source may have been a Brief Description of Scotland (1633), written by someone identified only as J. M. (Note: Stoddart identifies J. M. as probably being Monypenny.)

== Poem ==
The poem consists of 17 quatrains written in rhyming couplets. It begins by describing how the bell installed by the abbot was attached to a buoy, so it only rang when the Inchcape Rock was under water and the buoy was floating.

The holy Abbot of Aberbrothok
Had placed that bell on the Inchcape Rock;
On a buoy in the storm it floated and swung,
And over the waves its warning rung.

When the Rock was hid by the surge’s swell,
The Mariners heard the warning Bell;
And then they knew the perilous Rock,
And blest the Abbot of Aberbrothok

A pirate called Sir Ralph the Rover cuts down the bell, and drops it into the sea, because he was jealous of the Abbot, and wanted to plunder the ships that crashed. After its removal Ralph says, "The next who comes to the Rock, won’t bless the Abbot of Aberbrothok". Some time later Ralph's own ship founders on the rock while he is attempting to negotiate his way back to Scotland in bad weather, laden with booty. In classic 19th-century Romantic style, the ship sinks dramatically as Ralph hears the Devil summoning him to Hell by ringing the bell he had removed:

Sir Ralph the Rover tore his hair,
He cursed himself in his despair;
The waves rushed in on every side,
The ship is sinking beneath the tide.

But even in his dying fear,
One dreadful sound could the Rover hear;
A sound as if with the Inchcape Bell,
The Devil below was ringing his knell.

== Themes ==
Many of Southey's ballads describe supernatural events, and, with the devil ringing the bell, The Inchcape Rock is no exception. Bernhardt-Kabisch has argued that Southey's supernatural ballads "seemed purposed to objectify Southey's demons and to exorcise them by ridicule".

The poem's basic theme is that bad things happen to those who do bad things. In 1851, while discussing a plan to place bells across the country to help lost shepherds, Thomas De Quincey suggested that "The Inchcape Rock" should be used to discourage those who might seek to destroy the warning bells: "And every child might learn to fear a judgment of retribution upon its own steps in case of any such wicked action, by reading the tale of him, who, in order 'To plague the Abbot of Aberbrothock,' removed the bell from the Inchcape rock."

== Critical reception ==
Writing in 1873 Joseph Devey expressed his view that in this poem "Having small canvas for his picture, Southey at once seizes upon the salient features of the subject, and discards the fatal prolixity which mars most of his heavier productions. The 'Maid of the Inn,' the 'Well of St. Keyne,' the 'Battle of Blenheim,' the 'Inchcape Rock,' place Southey at the head of the ballad, while his 'Madoc' and his 'Roderic' place him very nearly at the tail of the epic poets of his country." "The Inchcape Rock" is included in the 10-volume The World's Best Poetry collection edited by William Bliss Carman and others, published in 1904.

In his 1947 English translation of Don Quixote by Miguel de Cervantes, J. M. Cohen refers to "The Inchcape Rock" as having a style he wishes to avoid in his rendering of the ballads by Cervantes.

== Legacy ==
There was no warning device on Inchcape Rock in modern times until 1810, when Robert Stevenson and John Rennie completed construction of the Bell Rock Lighthouse, but Southey's poem popularised the legend of the bell.
