= Clement of Dunblane =

13th-century Roman Catholic bishop; Dominican friar

Clement
- Bishop of Dunblane
- Church: Roman Catholic Church
- See: Dunblane
- In office: 1233–1258
- Predecessor: Osbert
- Successor: Robert de Prebenda

Orders
- Consecration: 1233

Personal details
- Born: Probably Scotland
- Died: 1258 Dunblane, Scotland

Clement (died 1258) was a 13th-century friar who was the first member of the Dominican Order in Britain and Ireland to become a bishop. In 1233, he was selected to lead the ailing diocese of Dunblane in Scotland, and faced a struggle to bring the bishopric of Dunblane (or "bishopric of Strathearn") to financial viability. This involved many negotiations with the powerful religious institutions and secular authorities which had acquired control of the revenue that would normally have been the entitlement of Clement's bishopric. The negotiations proved difficult, forcing Clement to visit the papal court in Rome. While not achieving all of his aims, Clement succeeded in saving the bishopric from relocation to Inchaffray Abbey. He also regained enough revenue to begin work on the new Dunblane Cathedral.

He faced a similar challenge with the impoverished bishopric of Argyll in the 1240s. He was given the job of restoring the viability of the diocese and installing a new bishop; this involved forming a close relationship with King Alexander II of Scotland. Clement was with the king during his campaign in Argyll in 1249 and was at his side when he died during this campaign. In 1250 Clement had been able to install a new bishop in Argyll and had become one of the Guardians appointed to govern Scotland during the minority of King Alexander III. By 1250 he had established a reputation as one of the most active Dominican reformers in Britain. Clement helped to elevate Edmund of Abingdon and Queen Margaret to sainthood. After his death, he received veneration as a saint himself, although he was never formally canonised.

== Early years and background ==
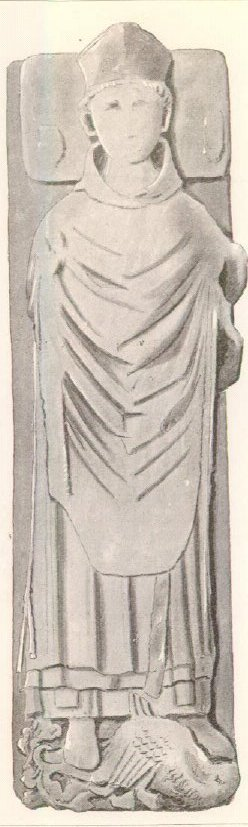
Effigy of bishop of Dunblane, identified as Clement

The Analecta Ordinis Fratrum Praedicatorum claims that he was "a Scot by birth", and that he was admitted into the Dominican Order of Paris in 1219. The latter source, however, is often highly unreliable, and cannot be fully trusted. The historian Archie Duncan was cautious about a date as firm and early as 1221, and wrote that Clement "had entered the Dominican order by the later 1220s". Although "Clement" is neither a Scottish nor an English name, the large number of French-speakers in both Scotland and England during this period means that this consideration carries limited weight; indeed "Clement" need not even have been his birth-name. The diocese of Dunblane was entirely Gaelic-speaking in Clement's day, and in this era it was often frowned upon for a bishop to be ignorant of the language of his diocese. If this had been a consideration in Clement's later appointment, then this would strongly suggest that Clement was in fact a Scot. Clement was later noted for his skill in languages. Clement received his university education at either the University of Oxford or the University of Paris, perhaps at both of these institutions. There is a possibility that he can be identified more fully as "Clement Rocha". A "Father Clement Rocha" was the owner of a manuscript from the period now held in Edinburgh. This, however, says nothing more about his background.

The Dominican Order had its origins in the reformist ideology of Dominic de Guzmán, later Saint Dominic. By 1219, Dominic had established houses as far apart as Paris, Bologna, Madrid and Segovia; at his death in 1221, there were 21 houses. Expansion of the order continued into England as houses were established at Oxford in 1221 and London in 1224. There were five houses in England by 1230, by which time the Order was poised to enter Scotland. Later tradition had it that the Dominican Order entered Scotland in 1230, encouraged by King Alexander II and William de Malveisin, Bishop of St Andrews. However, the earliest certain date for the foundation of a Dominican house in Scotland is 1234.

These details form the context for Clement's appearance in Scotland and his selection as the new Bishop of Dunblane. Three years had passed since the death of the last bishop, Osbert. Since there was no electoral college for the diocese, Pope Gregory IX charged the bishops of St Andrews, Brechin and Dunkeld, to find and nominate a suitable replacement. There can only be informed speculation regarding the choice of Clement. Importantly, perhaps, King Alexander was later noted for "his concern for building churches for the Friars Preacher [Fratrum precipue Predicatorum]". The status of the Dominicans at the cutting edge of religious reform, together with Clement's background, may have been the decisive factors. At any rate, Clement was consecrated as bishop at Wedale on 4 September 1233, by William de Malveisin, Bishop of St Andrews. His consecration meant that he was the first Dominican in the British Isles to obtain a bishopric. This has prompted the historian Archie Duncan to comment that "the choice of the first friar-bishop ... can only be called daring".

== Bishopric of Dunblane ==
The bishopric of Dunblane was a small diocese, essentially confined to the earldoms of Strathearn and Menteith. Size was a problem for providing the bishopric with adequate income, a problem compounded by the fact that Gille Brígte, Mormaer of Strathearn, had established Inchaffray Priory in 1200 (promoted to Abbey in 1221). In the 1440s, Bower wrote that Gille Brígte:

Divided his earldom into three equal portions. One he gave to the church and bishop of Dunblane, the second to St John the Evangelist and the canons of Inchaffray, the third he kept for himself and his own needs.

If this were not enough, much of the income not granted to Inchaffray had since been given to other religious institutions; some revenue was even controlled by the Bishop of Dunkeld. Dunblane had its origins in an older Gaelic monastic establishment, that is, in an institution with an abbot-bishop heading a relatively informal establishment of smaller cells with little geographical compactness. Dunblane emerged as a bishopric in 1155, probably, like bishoprics with a similar history (e.g. Brechin), having changed in little more than name. There was a community of Céli Dé at Muthill until at least the end of the 13th century, and the base for the archdeaconry of the diocese appears to have varied between there and Dunblane until the time of Bishop Clement. The bishopric itself appears to have been without a single base, although it was probably associated with both locations. Clement visited the papal court to present his difficult situation. In spring 1237, the Pope wrote to the Bishop of Dunkeld that:

Bishop Clement ... found the Church so desolated that there was no place in the Cathedral Church where he could lay his head; it had no college of clergy; the divine offices were celebrated in a roofless church and by a rural chaplain only; and the episcopal revenues were so slender, and had been alienated to such a degree, that they scarcely sufficed to support him for half a year.

In response to Clement's visit, moreover, the Pope had empowered the Bishops of Dunkeld, Brechin and St Andrews to take action to rescue the bishopric. He told these bishops that,

Since the continual care of all the churches is our daily burden, we grant to the said Church [Dunblane], so far as we personally can, and authorise you, if you find the situation to be as described, to assign to the said Bishop, if it can be done without scandal, a quarter of the teinds of all the parish churches of the Diocese of Dunblane, so that under your guidance and that of upright men, he may set aside a suitable portion of them for his own maintenance, and thereafter assign revenues for a dean and canons whom we wish and authorise you to institute there.

Failing this, the Pope wrote,

The quarter teinds of all the churches of the Diocese assigned to the Bishop, which are held by laymen, you shall transfer with the episcopal seat to the Canons Regular of St. John in the Diocese [i.e. to Inchaffray Abbey], who shall have power to elect a Bishop in any vacancy.

So the Pope's help was two-sided. It made Clement's task vis-à-vis these institutions easier, but on the other hand the possibility had emerged that Dunblane could disappear as an episcopal centre.

== Recovery and rebuilding ==
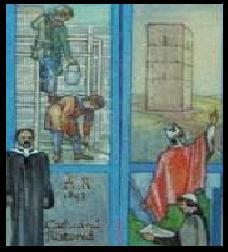
Modern artist's depiction of the building of Dunblane Cathedral, supervised by Bishop Clement

In the three or four years after his visit to the papacy, agreements were made with the various institutions who were drawing income from Clement's diocese – namely Coupar Angus Abbey, Lindores Abbey, Cambuskenneth Abbey, Arbroath Abbey, the nunnery of North Berwick and the Hospital of Brackley, Northamptonshire. These agreements did not constitute complete success. Clement was able to recover some revenue, but in fixed payments liable to real decline by way of inflation. Moreover, he had to concede permanent canonries to several of the abbots, concessions which would give them a role in the election of his successors. Another partial set-back took place. Walter Comyn, Earl of Menteith, had decided to found a monastery in his earldom and take up the income of Menteith's churches to do it; the whole of Menteith constituted nearly half of the diocese. Despite the Pope's previously helpful behaviour towards Clement's cause, he granted the earl permission to found the new monastery. The earl established Inchmahome Priory in the Lake of Menteith in 1238. Walter and Clement came to conflict over the new priory's rights, but in the same year an agreement was drawn up in a meeting of churchmen at Perth. The agreement placed most of Menteith's churches under the control of the earl; however, Clement obtained several concessions, including the right to receive episcopal dues from the new priory. Overall, Clement's successes were considerable considering the opposition which he faced, but even after his death, only 12 of the 26 parish churches in the diocese were under the bishop's direct control.

Although his successor Robert de Prebenda claimed that the income of the see was still inadequate, it was nevertheless enough for Clement to begin building a new cathedral. This was despite the virtual hostility of the earl of Menteith and what Cynthia Neville has noted as the lack of interest by the earls of Strathearn, evidenced by their reluctance to bestow patronage on the bishopric. Neville's explanation for this is that "the bishops' ambition represented a challenge to their proprietary interests". It has been suggested that Clement dismantled the small church building which had served Dunblane previously, before beginning work. The cathedral was constructed in the Gothic manner, beginning with the "Lady Chapel"; the Lady Chapel was used while the rest of the cathedral was being built. It is possible that the cathedral of Dunblane was completed during Clement's episcopate, and it is almost certain that most of it was.

== On the wider stage ==
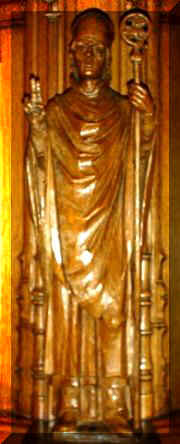
Figure of Bishop Clement in Dunblane Cathedral

Clement's position as Bishop of Dunblane provided the opportunity to participate on the larger national and international stage. In 1241, the Cistercian general chapter began postulating the Pope about the saintliness of Edmund of Abingdon, formerly Archbishop of Canterbury. In the following year, various clerics wrote pieces and compiled evidence supporting this Edmund's claim to sainthood. Clement was one of these clerics. Edmund's saintliness was endorsed by Pope Innocent IV in 1246. Clement took part in a similar campaign in 1249. He was part of the movement to canonise Queen Margaret, one of the ancestors of the contemporary Scottish kings. Clement was appointed to investigate her saintliness, and in the following year Margaret too was canonised. Meanwhile, in 1247, Pope Innocent IV gave Clement the more onerous and demanding appointment of papal tax collector. Clement was charged with collecting one twentieth of all ecclesiastical revenues within the Kingdom of the Scots. The purpose was to finance a new crusade, and Clement's appointment was part of a money-raising initiative carried out throughout Western Christendom.

Perhaps Clement's most significant activities were, however, in relation to the bishopric of Argyll. In 1241, Argyll's last bishop, William, had been drowned while at sea. Argyll was the poorest bishopric in Scotland, and the area lacked strong royal authority, and hence good royal protection. In the following six years, no one had taken up the vacant bishopric. From at least 1247, then, Clement was given charge of the diocese. He was essentially being asked to do for Argyll what he had previously done for Strathearn. The sources are quite thin on this ground, but by 1249 he had brought at least one more church into the control of the bishopric. On 23 December 1248, he was also authorised by the Pope to appoint, with the agreement of the Bishop of Glasgow, a new bishop for Argyll. In January 1249, Clement was given permission to move the cathedral of Argyll, based on Lismore, to the mainland. Clement's problem seems to have been with the ruler of Argyll, Eóghan. The lack of royal authority in Argyll made it difficult for the national and international church to exercise control in the province; at the same time, establishing a strong bishopric in the area was vital to integrating the area fully into the kingdom, an aim cherished by the contemporary king, Alexander II. Thus Alexander's goal and Clement's goal were essentially one and the same. It is impossible to be more specific, but in 1249, King Alexander II launched an expedition against Eóghan. The king was attempting to force Eóghan, whose lands lay within both the overlordship of the Kingdom of Scotland and the Kingdom of Norway, to renounce his allegiance to the King of Norway. Eóghan told Alexander that he was unable to do this. The contemporary historian Matthew Paris wrote that:

The king therefore declared Eóghan unfaithful and pursued him hostilely by ship near Argyll; urged, as is said, by the vehement promptings of a certain indiscreet bishop of Strathearn, a friar to wit of the order of the Preachers.

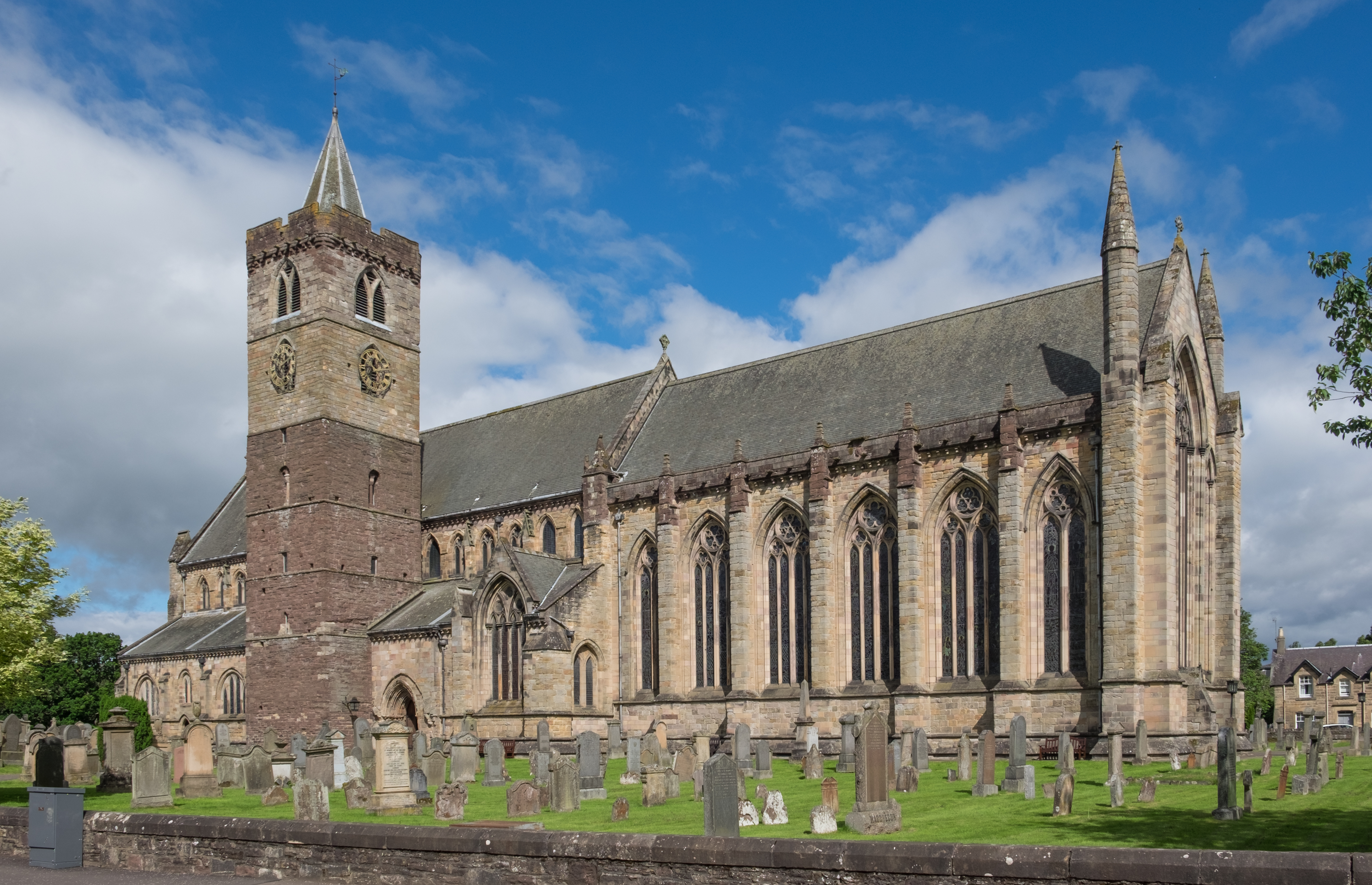
(Modern) Dunblane Cathedral, the seat (cathedra) of Bishop Clement, which he was responsible for rebuilding

This "indiscreet bishop ... friar" was, of course, Clement. Alexander died from ill-health on this expedition, with Clement by his side at his deathbed. Alexander's last act was to make a grant to the bishopric of Argyll. Despite the king's death, the expedition was a success for Clement. There was a new Bishop of Argyll by 27 September 1250; in the longer term, the see continued to be ruled by bishops with no long vacancies until the Reformation. Moreover, by 1255 Eóghan had given his full allegiance to the Scottish crown, albeit because of lack of favour given to him by the King of Norway.

Clement's close association with the late King Alexander II and his reputation as a successful bishop made him a key political figure during the minority of Alexander III. Clement was on the Council of Guardians, the small group of nobles and clerics who were to "govern" Scotland until the end of Alexander III's boyhood. The governing Council broke down around two rival factions, one centred on Walter Comyn and the other around Alan Durward. There is little evidence about Clement's activities in regard to the Council, but he was associated with the Comyn faction, who enjoyed the ascendency after Walter gained control of government in 1251. In 1255, the Durwards staged a coup at Roxburgh and ousted the "Comyn faction" from effective power. Unfortunately for Alan Durward, Comyn's supporter Gamelin, who had been placed in the bishopric of St Andrews and excluded from his diocese by Durward, had fled to the papal court and convinced the Pope to excommunicate Alan. The sentence was delivered by Bishop Clement and the abbots of Melrose and Jedburgh. This is Clement's last known act.

== Death and legacy ==
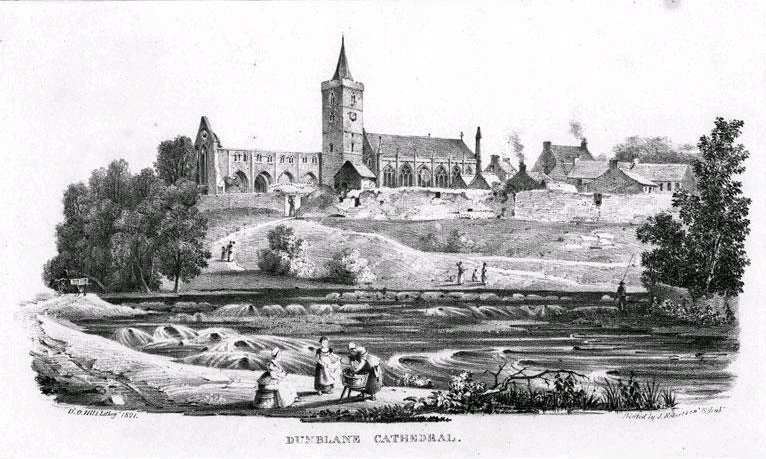
A chalk lithographic sketch of Dunblane Cathedral published in 1821, a half century before the reconstruction of the cathedral

The Chronicle of Melrose reports Clement's death under the year 1258. Clement's legacy was to be remembered as the restorer of the diocese of Dunblane and the builder of its cathedral. Thus for future generations, Clement became the father-figure of the see. Clement was later commemorated as a saint, though there is no record of formal canonisation. He was commemorated on 19 March, meaning that was almost certainly believed to have been the date of his death. Clement's death was also noted by Walter Bower, a Lowland Scottish historian writing in the 1440s, who included the following obituary:

Clement bishop of Dunblane died, that outstanding member of the Order of Preachers, a man most eloquent in translating various tongues, powerful in speech and action in the sight of God and of men. He found the cathedral church of his diocese reduced by the neglect of his predecessors to such a state of decay that the divine offices were celebrated in it scarcely three times a week, as if it were some rural chapel. He built it up to be a hallowed sanctuary, enriched it with lands and possessions, and increased its prestige by adding prebends and canonries.

Such flattering sentiments had even been expressed during Clement's lifetime. In 1250, the General Chapter of the Dominican Order met in London, and decreed that:

we grant to Friar Clement of our Order, a bishop of Scotland, after his death, one mass throughout the Order by every friar whomsoever is a priest.

Clement was credited with being a prolific translator and writing four books (including a hagiography of St Dominic), all of which are now lost; a sermon almost certainly written by him survives.

Some historians have been ambiguous about Clement's episcopate. For instance, Cynthia Neville, despite acknowledging that "the successful reform of the see was, in fact, accomplished almost exclusively as a consequence of the efforts of Clement and his successors", nevertheless expresses some scepticism about his achievements and notices his failure to gain the patronage of the native rulers of Strathearn. Others have been more enthusiastic. The ecclesiastical historian and former minister of Dunblane Cathedral, James Hutchison Cockburn, agreed with Bower's eulogy and declared that the "title" of sainthood "would have been worthily bestowed". Archie Duncan, more recently, stated that Clement "clearly enjoyed a reputation far wider than his domestic accomplishments alone would explain" and concluded that Clement "represents the occasional triumph of the ideal of reform of church life over the careerism which generally motivated thirteenth-century clergy".

== Notes ==
Religious titles
Preceded by Osbert	Bishop of Dunblane; 1233–1258	Succeeded by Robert de Prebenda
