= Radulf (bishop-elect) =

Radulf (fl. 1223–1226) is an obscure churchman in early 13th-century Scotland, elected as Bishop of Dunblane some time between 1223 and 1225. The first of only two notices of his existence occurs in an Arbroath Abbey deed where he is styled "Radulf elect of Dunblane"; the document can be dated to 1223–1225. On 12 January 1226 Pope Honorius III instructed the Bishop of St Andrews, the Bishop of Moray and the Bishop of Caithness, to enjoin a new election for the bishopric of Dunblane, as "R. elected Bishop of Dunblane" had resigned in the Pope's presence a short time before. There are no clues as to Radulf's career after that. The Cathedral chapter of the diocese elected one Osbert in his place. Cockburn suggested Radulf was probably a Frenchman who had immigrated to Scotland, who got elected Bishop, but decided he would rather stay in Continental Europe after he travelled there for consecration, perhaps being offered a better post there.

== Notes ==
Religious titles
| Preceded by Abraham | Bishop of Dunblane (elect); 1223 × 1225–1226 | Succeeded by Osbert |
