= Abraham of Strathearn =

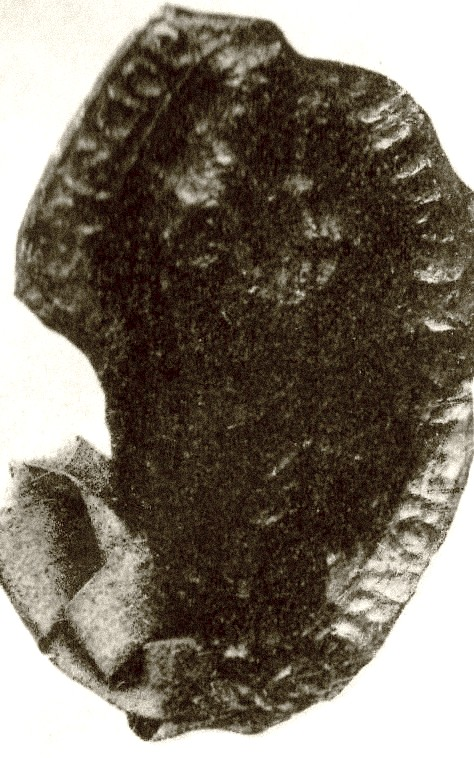
Bishop Abraham's seal, attached to a charter of 1211.

Abraham was an early 13th-century Scottish cleric who held the position of Bishop of Dunblane. He was a chaplain to the Mormaer of Strathearn, Gille Brígte.

There are no exact accounts of his origin, but his name and the background suggest he was a native Scot from Strathearn. There is no evidence to the contrary. Neville wrote that his "Hebrew name conceals an English provenance", but in fact the Hebrew name is more consistent with established Gaelic-naming patterns than with English or French ones.

He was a son of a priest, and had at least one son of his own, Arthur by name. Evidence from the charters of Inchaffray Abbey shows that he was bishop-elect by some date between the years 1210 and 1214.

A charter from Arbroath Abbey shows he had been consecrated by 4 December 1214. The date of his death is not known, but Radulf was bishop-elect in an Arbroath document datable between 1223 and 1225.

== Notes ==
Religious titles
Preceded by Jonathan	Bishop of Dunblane; 1210 x 1214 –1220 x 1225	Succeeded by Radulf
