= Osbert of Dunblane =

Osbert († 1231) was an early 13th-century cleric who held the position of Bishop of Dunblane (Scotland). A mandate for a new election was issued in January 1226 after the presumed resignation of Osbert's predecessor Radulf. Osbert's name (as "O.") appears in the cartulary of Cambuskenneth Abbey, dating 1227 x 1231, where he is called "Bishop of Strathearn". An unnamed bishop of Dunblane occurs in the Dunfermline Registrum, dating to April 1227, and this was certainly Osbert. He also appears in attendance at a council held in Dundee in 1230. He had become an Augustinian canon at Holyrood Abbey by the time of his recorded death in 1231.

Religious titles
Preceded by Radulf	Bishop of Dunblane; 1226 x 1227–1231	Succeeded by Clement
