= Abbot of Arbroath =

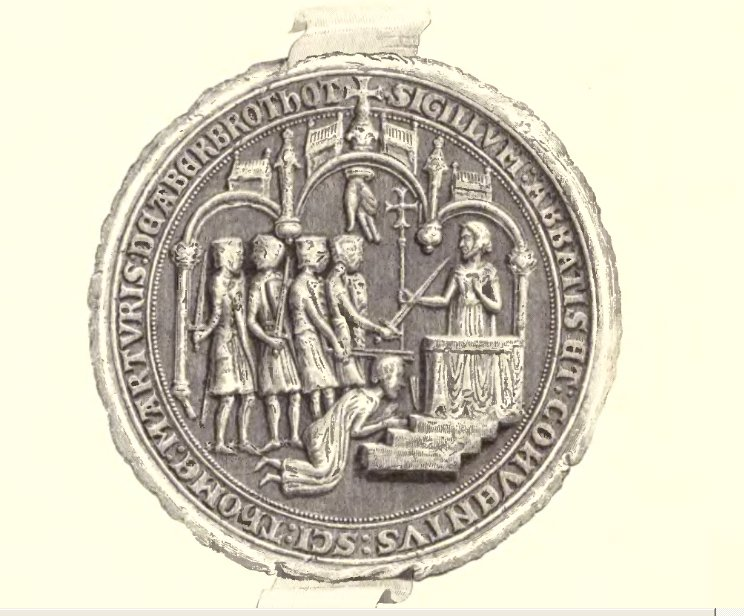
Abbey seal, depicting the murder of St Thomas Becket

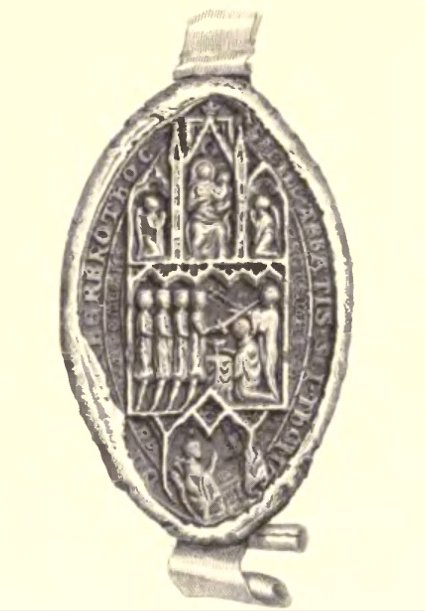
Another abbey seal, again depicting the murder of St Thomas Becket

The Abbot of Arbroath or Abbot of Aberbrothok (and later Commendator) was the head of the Tironensian Benedictine monastic community of Arbroath Abbey, Angus, Scotland, founded under the patronage of King William of Scotland from Kelso Abbey and dedicated to St Thomas of Canterbury, Thomas Becket. The abbot, John Gedy, was granted the mitre on 26 June 1396. Arbroath Abbey became the wealthiest and most powerful abbey in later medieval Scotland.

According to the poem "The Inchcape Rock" by Robert Southey, John Gedy, then Abbot of Aberbrothok, fixed a bell to the Inchcape Rock in the 1300s to warn mariners of the perilous rock.

The following is a list of abbots and commendators.

- Reginald, 1178–79
- Henry, 1179–1207
- Gilbert, 1208–19 x 1229
- Radulf de Lamley, 1225–39
- Adam, 1240–46
- Walter, 1247–58 x
- Robert, 1261–67
- Sabinus, 1267 ?
- John, 1268–70
- William, 1276–84
- Henry, 1285–96
- Nicholas, 1296 x 99-1301
- John de Anegus, 1303–09
- Bernard, 1310–28
- Geoffrey, 1329–47
- William, 1348–66
- John, 1370–84
- John Gedy, 1384–1410
- Walter Paniter, 1410–49
- Robert Bowmaker, 1419
- Richard Guthrie, 1449–55
- Malcolm Brydy, 1456–70
- Richard Guthrie, 1470–12
- Hugh Douglas, 1470
- Francis Gonzaga, 1472
- Alexander Scrymgeour, 1472
- Patrick Graham, 1473–76
- George Boyce, 1472–82
- William Bonkil, 1482–84
- David Lichton, 1484–1503
- James Stewart, 1503–04
- George Hepburn, 1504–13
- Gavin Douglas, 1514
- Andrew Forman, 1514
- James Stewart, 1514–17
- Peter de Accoltis, 1517
- James Beaton, 1517–23 x 1524
- David Beaton, 1524–45
- James Beaton II, 1545–51
- George Douglas, 1546
- John, Lord Hamilton 1551–68
- George Douglas, (again) 1568–72, became Bishop of Moray
- John, Lord Hamilton (again), 1573–79
- Esmé Stuart, 1579–83
