= Saint Blane =

Bishop and Confessor In Scotland

- Born: Unknown; Bute
- Died: 590
- Venerated in: Catholic Church; Eastern Orthodox Church; Scottish Episcopal Church
- Feast: 10/11 August

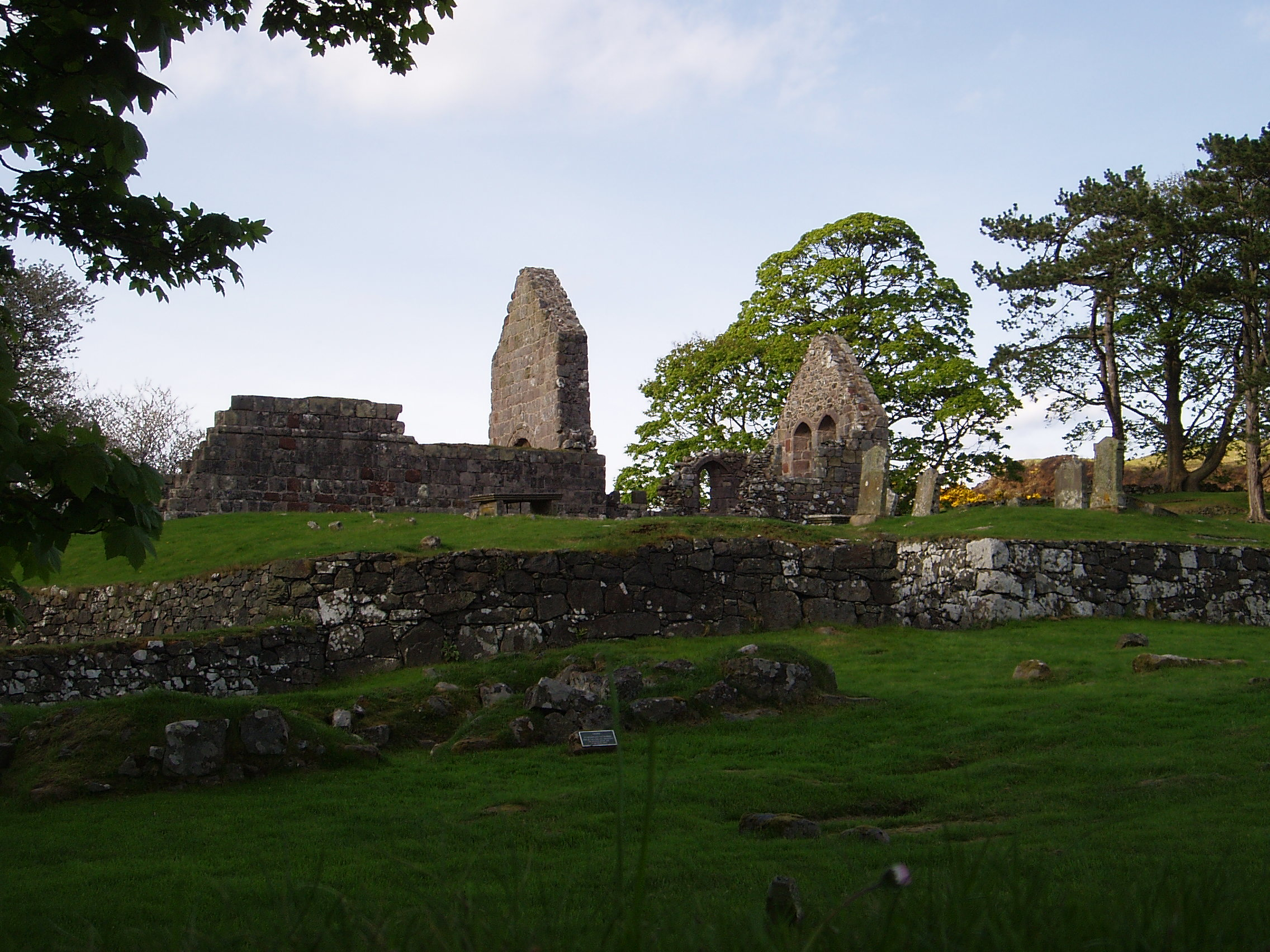
St Blane's Church viewed from the wall surrounding the old and the new graveyards.

Saint Blane (Old Irish Bláán, died 590) was a bishop and confessor in Scotland, born on the Isle of Bute, date unknown; died 590. His feast is kept on 10 August.

== Origin ==
Late (medieval) Scottish texts relate that his mother was Irish and that Saint Cathan was her brother. It was Cathan who saw to Blane's education in Ireland under Saints Comgall and Kenneth.

Blane eventually became a monk, went to Scotland, and was eventually bishop among the Picts.

Blan apparently had holy earth transported from Rome. As he carried his precious burden up from Port Lughdach, through Glencallum, to the site of his chapel, the " rigwoodie," to which the creels of earth were suspended, from his neck, broke. He implored a native woman, then on her way to the shore to collect " moorach," little shell-fish, to assist him, only to meet a refusal. The irritated saint replied to the disobliging dame: "An uair a theid thu do an traigh Biodh am muir Ian ann," i.e., Whenever you go to the sea-shore may there be high tide.

After his church was erected, he broadened this curse by enacting that no women were to obtain burial in his cemetery beside the men. An adjoining piece of ground was assigned to females and this custom of separate burial survived till 1661, when it was stopped by an injunction of the Presbytery of Dunoon.

Several miracles are related to him, among them the restoration of a dead boy to life.

The Aberdeen Breviary gives these and other details of the saint's life, which are rejected, however, by the Bollandists. There can be no doubt that devotion to St Blane was, from early times, popular in Scotland. There was a church of St Blane in Dumfries and another at Kilblane. In Greenock, the place name Kilblain is thought to refer to a cell or chapel of St Blane.

== Associated Places ==
There is a well in the strath, or valley, called Blane's Well and also a place in the neighborhood called Garcattoun, which might be named after his uncle, St Cathan.

His name is recorded on the Scottish landscape at Strathblane in the central lowlands from Loch Lomond to Dunblane. The highest authorities say the saint died in 590. The ruins of his church at Kingarth, Bute, where his remains were buried, are still standing and form an object of great interest to antiquarians; St Blane's Chapel is picturesquely situated about 800 metres from Dunagoil Bay. The bell of his monastery is believed to be preserved at Dunblane. Dunblane Cathedral is said to have been founded on the site first used by St Blane.
