= Diocese of Dunblane =

Historical diocese of Scotland (c. 1155-1689)

Coordinates: 56.189°N 3.961°W

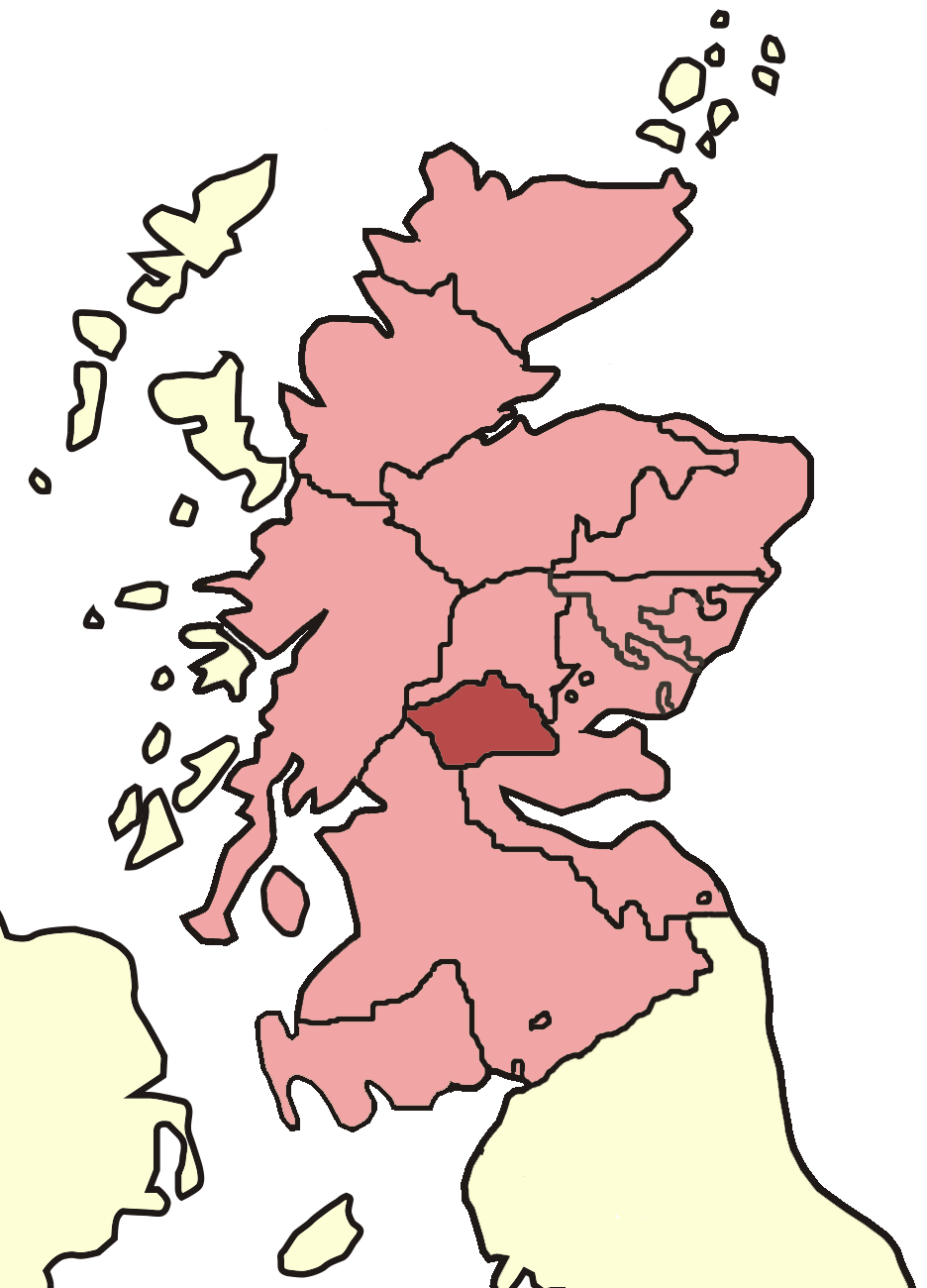
Skene's map of Scottish bishoprics in the reign of David I (reigned 1124–1153).

The Diocese of Dunblane or Diocese of Strathearn was one of the thirteen historical dioceses of Scotland, before the abolition of episcopacy in the Scottish Church in 1689.

Roughly, it embraced the territories covered by the old earldoms of Strathearn and Menteith, covering the western and central portions of Perthshire.

The first record of its existence is a papal bull from 1155 referring to M. de Dunblan. By the episcopate of Bishop Clement, the cathedral was firmly located in Dunblane, Strathearn, Perth and Kinross.

The diocese was led by the Bishop of Dunblane.

== Medieval parishes ==
1. Aberfoyle
2. Abernethy
3. Aberuthven
4. Auchterarder
5. Balquhidder
6. Callander
7. Comrie
8. Dron
9. Dunblane (Cathedral)
10. Dunning
11. Dupplin
12. Exmagirdle
13. Findo Gask
14. Fossoway & Tullibole
15. Fowlis Wester
16. Glendevon
17. Kilbride
18. Kilmadock
19. Kilmahog
20. Kincardine-in-Menteith
21. Kinkell
22. Leny
23. Monzie
24. Monzievaird
25. Muthill
26. Port of Menteith
27. St Madoes
28. Strageith
29. Strowan
30. Tillicoultry
31. Trinity Gask
32. Tulliallan
33. Tullibody
34. Tullicheddill

== See also ==
- Roman Catholic Church in Scotland
- Scottish Episcopal Church Diocese of Saint Andrews, Dunkeld and Dunblane
