= Abbot of Inchaffray =

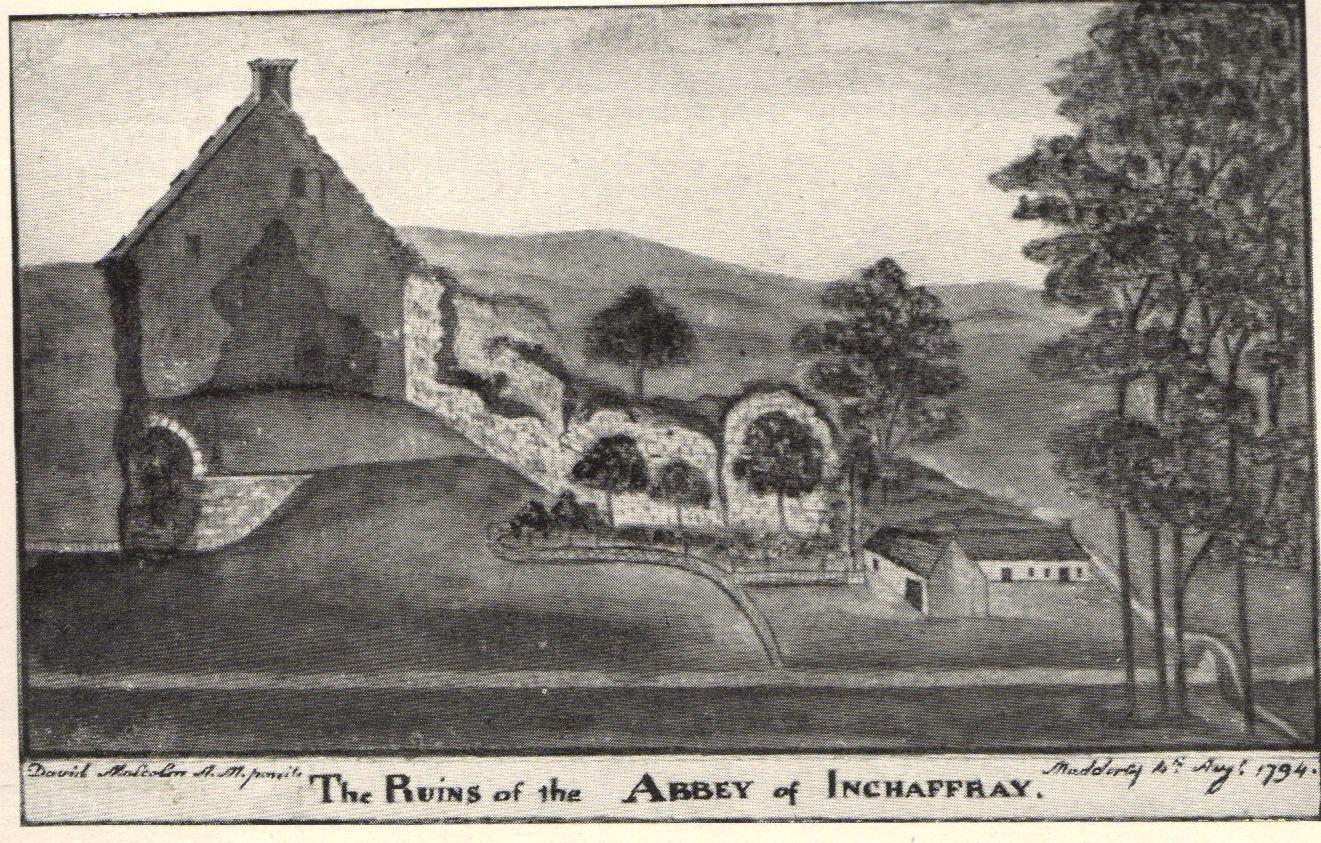
Ruins of the abbey as depicted in 1794

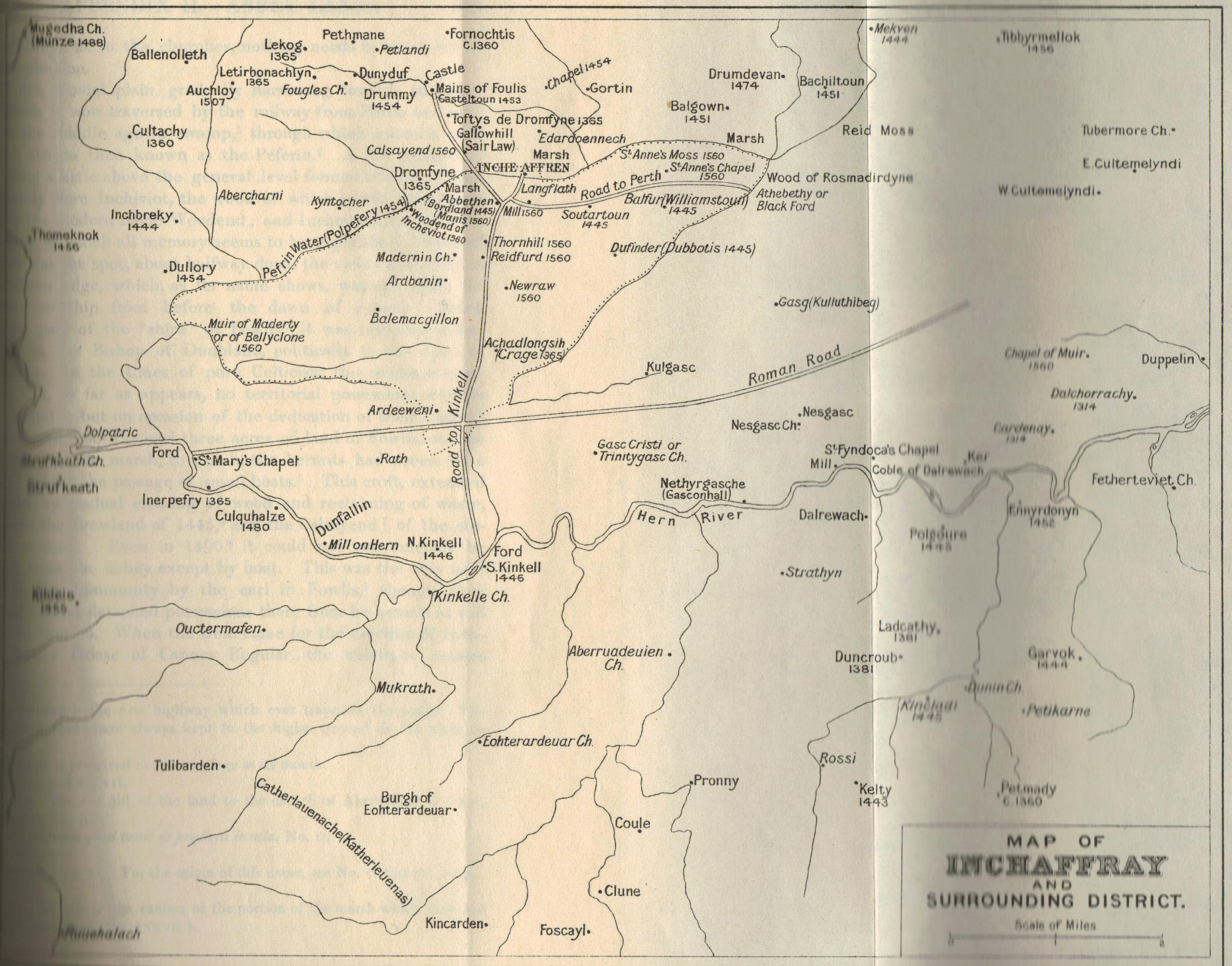
Map of the area around the abbey in Strathearn.

The Abbot of Inchaffray, before 1221 Prior of Inchaffray, and then by the end of the 15th century, the Commendator of Inchaffray, was the head of the community of Augustinian canons of Inchaffray Abbey and their lands. Inchaffray is in Strathearn, in southern Perthshire, Scotland. The house was founded by Gille Brigte (Gilbert), mormaer of Strathearn in 1200 as a priory and was elevated to an abbey in 1221. By the late 15th century the monastery was becoming secularized. and after the resignation of Abbot George Mureff (Murray) in 1495, Laurence, Lord Oliphant, took over as commendator and thereafter it was held by commendators. It was turned into a secular lordship for Commendator James Drummond, Lord Maddertie, but the final formalization of the lordship did not come until 1669, when it was given to William Drummond.

== List of priors of Inchaffray ==
- Maol Íosa, 1200
- John, 1212x1214
- Alpín (Elphin), 1219–1220
- Innocent, 1220–1221

== List of abbots of Inchaffray ==
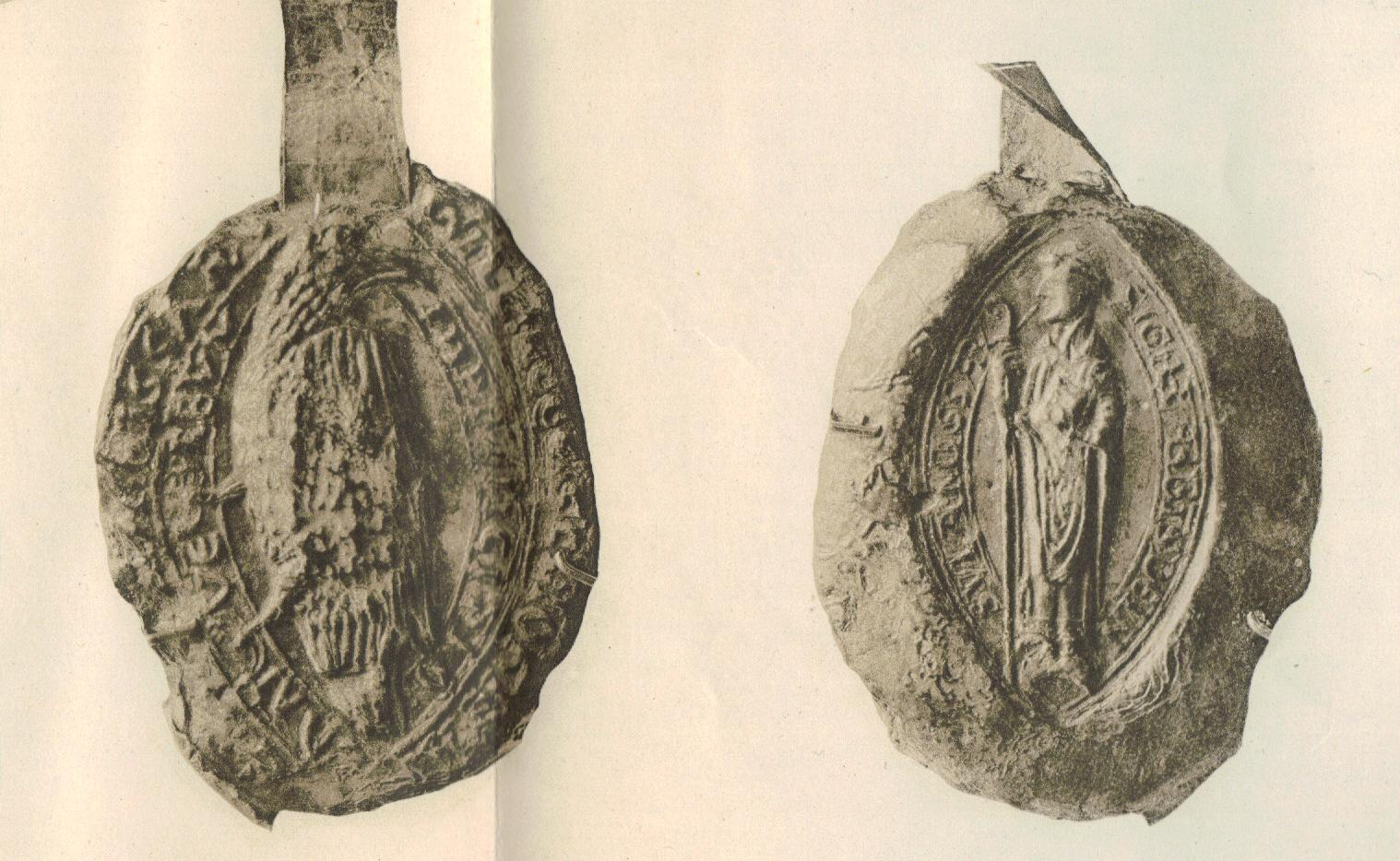
Seal of the abbot of Inchaffray. The abbot is either Innocent or Nicholas.

- Innocent (continuing as abbot), 1221-1235x
- Nicholas, 1239–1240
- Alan, 1258–1271
- Hugh, 1284–1292
- Thomas, 1296
- Maurice, 1304 x 1305–1322
- Cristin, 1322–x 1358
- John, 1358–1363
- William (I), 1363
- Symon de Scone, x 1365
- John, 1365
- William (II), 1370
- John de Kelly, 1373
- William de Culross, 1380–1387
- William Franklyn, 1399–1414
- Patrick de Lome, 1414
- Donald (?de Dunfermline), 1417–1430
- John Lange, 1429
- John de Treloch, 1429–1430
- Robert Beaton, 1430
- William de Crannach, 1430–1433
- John de Moravia, 1435–1445
- Nicholas Fethkill, 1458–1462
- George Mureff (Murray), 1458–1492/5
  - William Haddington, 1463–1482

== List of commendators of Inchaffray ==
- Laurence Oliphant, 1495–1513
- Peter Accoltis, 1513–1514
- Alexander Stewart de Pitcairne, 1514–1537
- Gavin Dunbar, 1538–1547
- John Hamilton, 1547–1551
- Alexander Gordon, 1551–1566
- James Drummond, 1565–1610

== Bibliography ==
- Cowan, Ian B. & Easson, David E., Medieval Religious Houses: Scotland With an Appendix on the Houses in the Isle of Man, Second Edition, (London, 1976), p. 91
- Lindsay, William Alexander, Dowden, John & Thomson, John Maitland (eds.), Charters of Inchaffray Abbey, 1190-1609, Publications of the Scottish History Society, Volume LVI, (Edinburgh, 1908), pp. 249–57
- Watt, D.E.R. & Shead, N.F. (eds.), The Heads of Religious Houses in Scotland from the 12th to the 16th Centuries, The Scottish Records Society, New Series, Volume 24, (Edinburgh, 2001), pp. 101–05

== See also ==
- Viscount Strathallan
