= Dunblane Cathedral =

Church in Scotland

Coordinates: 56°11′21.91″N 3°57′54.9″W

- Cathedral Church of St Blaan and St Laurence
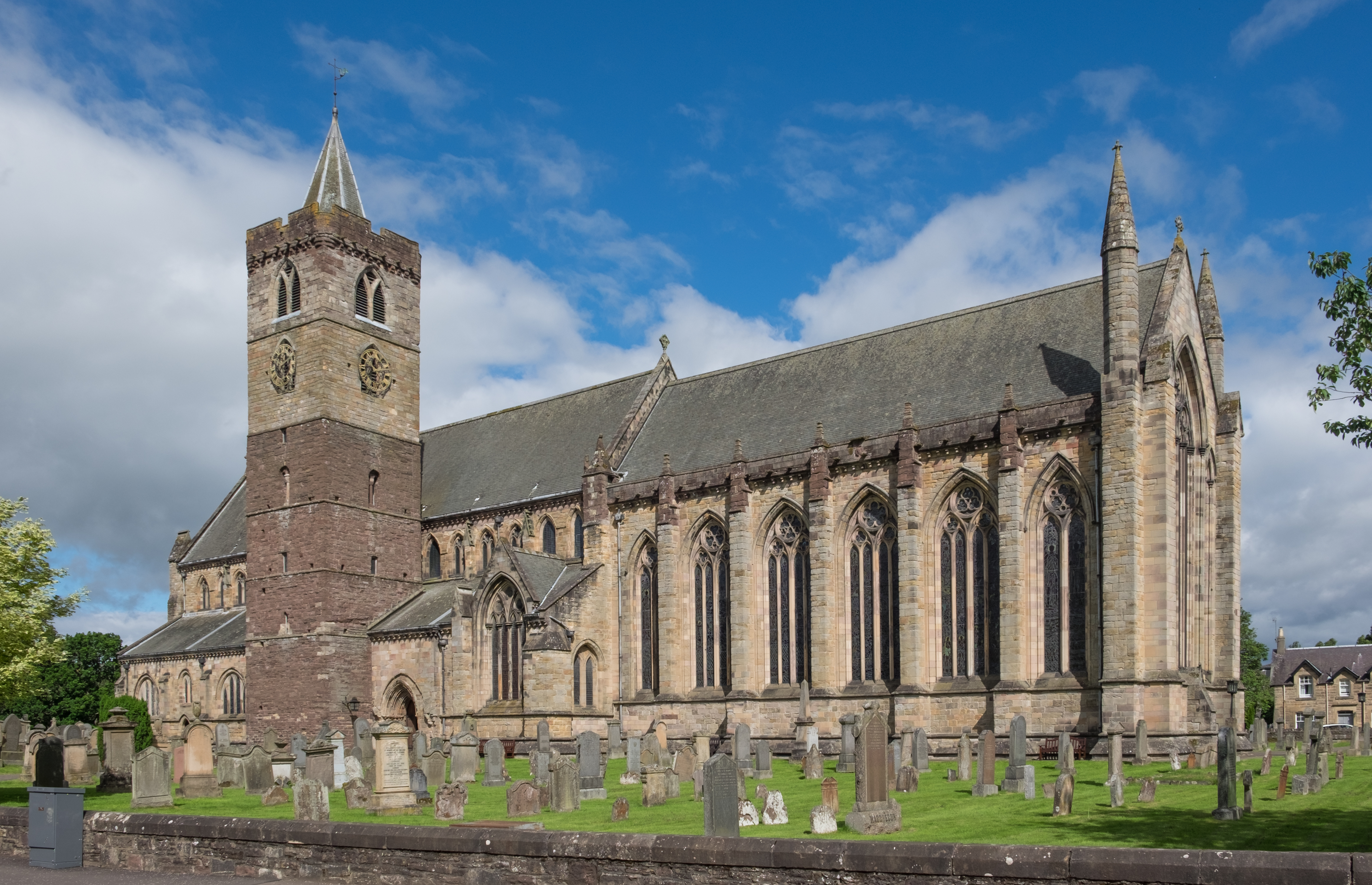
- Dunblane Cathedral in 2017
- Dunblane Cathedral
- Country: Scotland
- Denomination: Church of Scotland
- Previous denomination: Roman Catholic
- Website: www.dunblanecathedral.org.uk

History
- Status: Parish church
- Founded: c. 7th century (site)
- Founder: Saint Blane

Architecture
- Functional status: Active
- Architect: Robert Rowand Anderson (restoration)
- Style: Gothic (mostly)
- Years built: 11th to 15th century 1889 (restoration)

Listed Building – Category A
- Official name: Cathedral Church of St Blaan and St Laurence including churchyard, boundary wall and Riccarton's Stile
- Designated: 5 October 1971
- Reference no.: LB26361

Scheduled monument
- Official name: Dunblane Cathedral
- Designated: 30 November 1981
- Reference no.: SM90109

Dunblane Cathedral is a Church of Scotland church in Dunblane, Scotland.

The lower half of the tower is pre-Romanesque from the 11th century, and was originally free-standing, with an upper part added in the 15th century. Most of the rest of the building is Gothic, from the 13th century. The building was restored and the nave re-roofed by Robert Rowand Anderson from 1889 to 1893.

== History ==
The church is dedicated to the 6th century saint, St Blane, and this gives its name to the settlement: dunblane meaning hill of St Blane. The church also had an altar to St Laurence. The oldest surviving part of the church is the lower four storeys of the tower which date from around 1100AD. The upper two storeys of the tower date from around 1500.

The cathedral was once the seat of the bishops of Dunblane (also sometimes called 'of Strathearn'), until the abolition of bishops after the Glorious Revolution in 1689. There are remains of the vaults of the episcopal palace to the south of the cathedral. Technically, it is no longer a cathedral, as there are no bishops in the Church of Scotland, which is a Presbyterian denomination. After the abolition of prelacy, the choir became the parish church but the nave fell out of use, and its roof had fallen in by about 1600.

It contains the graves of Margaret Drummond of Stobhall, a mistress of King James IV of Scotland and her two sisters, all said to have been poisoned.

Unusually, the building is owned by the Crown, and is looked after by Historic Scotland rather than the church governance; there is no entrance charge.

The building is largely 13th century in date, though it incorporates an originally freestanding bell-tower (like the example at Muthill) of 11th century date on its south side. This tower was increased in height in the 15th century, a change clearly visible in the colour of the stonework, and in the late Gothic style of the upper storey's windows.

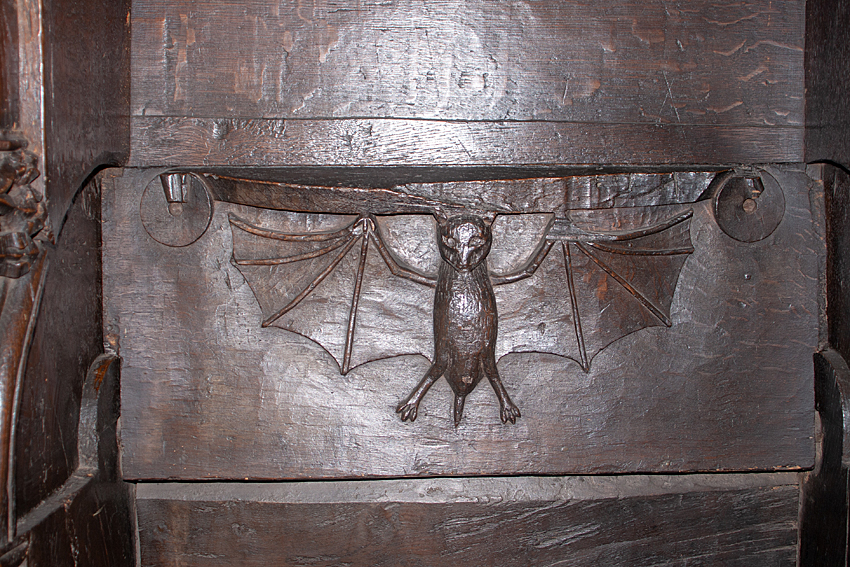
15th century bat misericord

The choir dates from the 13th century and has a long vaulted chamber which served as chapter house and sacristy on its north side. The choir contains the mural tomb of the cathedral's founder, Bishop Clement. Many of the 15th century choir stalls, commissioned by Bishop Ochiltre have carved misericords (including one with an unusual depiction of a bat), are preserved within the choir. Further, more elaborate, canopied stalls, commissioned by Bishop Chisholm, are preserved at the west end of the nave. Dunblane has the largest surviving collection of medieval Scottish ecclesiastical woodwork after King's College Chapel, Aberdeen. Some detached fragments are displayed in the town's museum.

The cathedral was restored in the late 19th century under the control of Rev Alexander Ritchie DD, who commissioned architect Robert Rowand Anderson to oversee the works, with these works completed by Sir Robert Lorimer in 1912.

On 13 June 2024, the charge of Dunblane Cathedral became a union with the parishes of Kilmadock and Kincardine-in-Menteith to become Dunblane Cathedral, Kilmadock and Blair Drummond Church.

== Stained glass ==
- West window - Tree of Jesse by Clayton and Bell placed 1906 by Robert Younger, Baron Blanesburgh
- Baptismal window (over font) John the Baptist in the River Jordan, by Douglas Strachan 1926
- Window over south-west door, St George and Hope by Louis Davis 1915 in memory of Col. J Boyd Wilson, a church elder
- The Barty window, the Song of Solomon by Louis Davis erected 1917
- The Apostles (south-east corner) in memory of Mr and Mrs Wallace of Glassingall
- John the Baptist and the Good Shepherd (south-east corner) in memory of Rev Dr Henry M Hamilton c.1905
- Main East Window (choir), the Life of Christ by Charles Eamer Kempe 1901 in memory of John Alexander Hay
- South window (choir) Three Holy Children from the Book of Daniel by Louis Davis presented by Robert Younger, Baron Blanesburgh
- Allegory window (choir), four angels, four directions
- Chaos window (choir), a curiosity representing Scott's tragic journey to the South Pole and naming the five men killed
- The Earth window (choir)
- The Humanity window (choir) Adam and Eve with Cain and Abel
- Memorial window (Lady Chapel) St Blane and a Crusader, Bishop Maurice and a WWI soldier, by Douglas Strachan c, 1922
- The Lord's Supper (Lady Chapel) by Douglas Strachan c.1922
- The Healing of the Sick (Lady Chapel) by Douglas Strachan c.1922
- The Transfiguration (Lady Chapel) by Gordon Webster c.1922
- Christ justifying harvesting on the Sabbath (Lady Chapel) by Gordon Webster
- Christ on the Sea of Galilee (Lady Chapel) by Gordon Webster
- Ruskin window (over west door) only visible from outside

== Burials ==
Preserved within the arcaded nave are two early Christian stones, a cross-slab and a possible architectural frieze, survivals from an early medieval church on the same site, founded by or dedicated to the 'Blane' whose name is commemorated in the name of the town.

Dunblane Cathedral churchyard contains two war graves, including that of William Stirling, a gunner in the Royal Marine Artillery during World War I.

== Monuments of interest ==
- Bishop Clement of Dunblane (d.1258)
- Malise II, Earl of Strathearn (d.1271)
- The Three Drummond Sisters, poisoned, 16th century
- Rev James Finlayson DD (1758-1808)
- Sir David Russell (1809-1884)
- James Stirling (1690-1770) and the Stirlings of Garden
- John Stirling of Kippendavie (d.1812) by Peter Turnerelli
- Jane Stirling (1804-1859)m daughter of the above

== Dunblane Commemoration ==
In the nave of the cathedral is a standing stone by the monumental sculptor Richard Kindersley which commemorates the events of 13 March 1996 – the Dunblane Massacre. The quotations on the stone are by E. V. Rieu ("He called a little child to him..."), Richard Henry Stoddard ("...the spirit of a little child"), Bayard Taylor ("But still I dream that somewhere there must be The spirit of a child that waits for me") and W. H. Auden ("We are linked as children in a circle dancing").

== Other churches in Dunblane ==
Dunblane Cathedral is one of at least eight churches in the town. The others are St Blane's (another Church of Scotland congregation, named after the town's founder), St Mary's (a Scottish Episcopal Church congregation), Dunblane Free Church of Scotland, the Roman Catholic Church dedicated to the Holy Family, the Quaker Meeting House, the (independent Evangelical) Dunblane Christian Fellowship, and the Eastern Orthodox parish dedicated to Saint Nicholas; unusually, this Orthodox community is Old Calendarist and thus comes directly under the authority of the Ecumenical Patriarchate rather than the nearest Orthodox bishop.

== Gallery ==
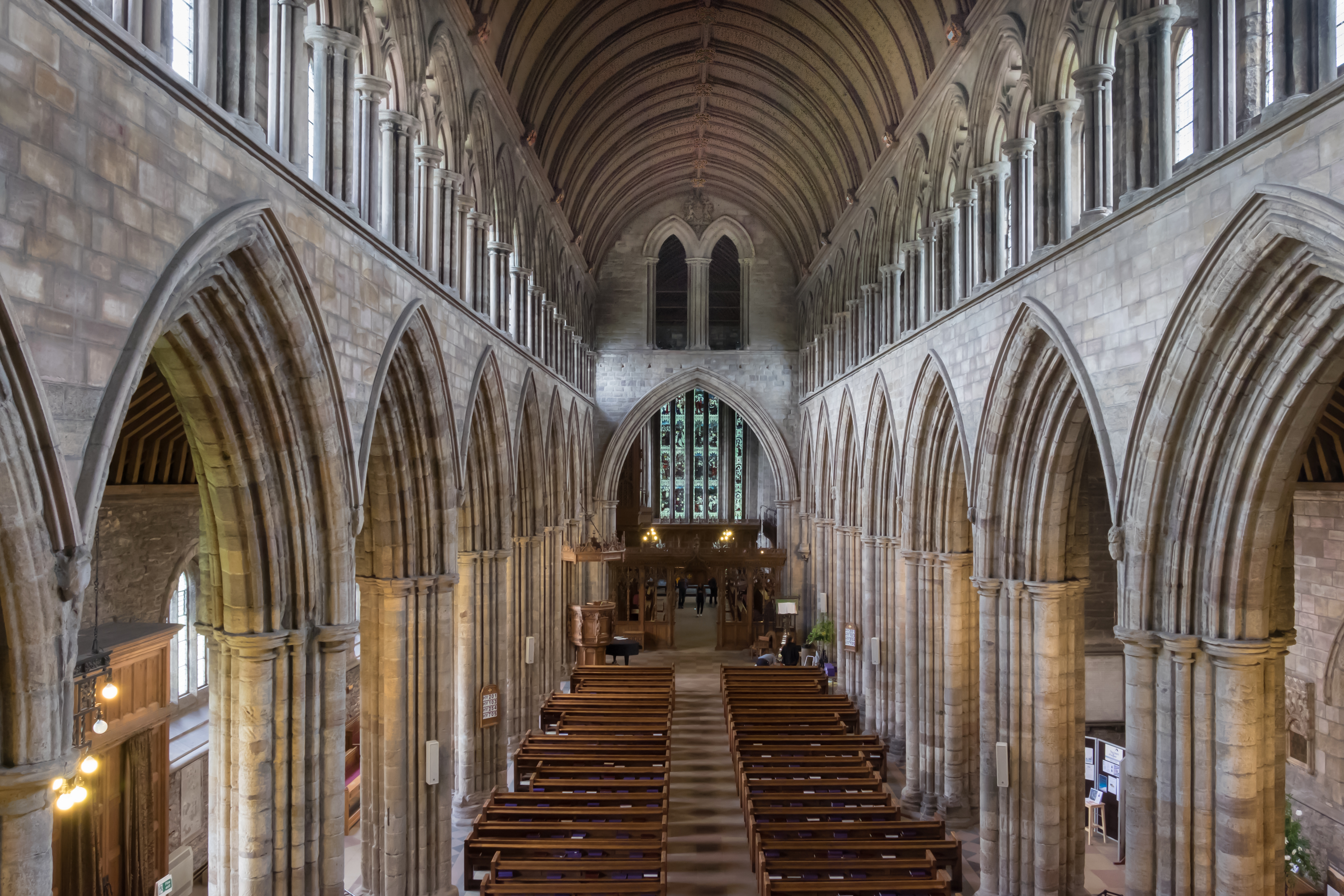
The nave looking east.

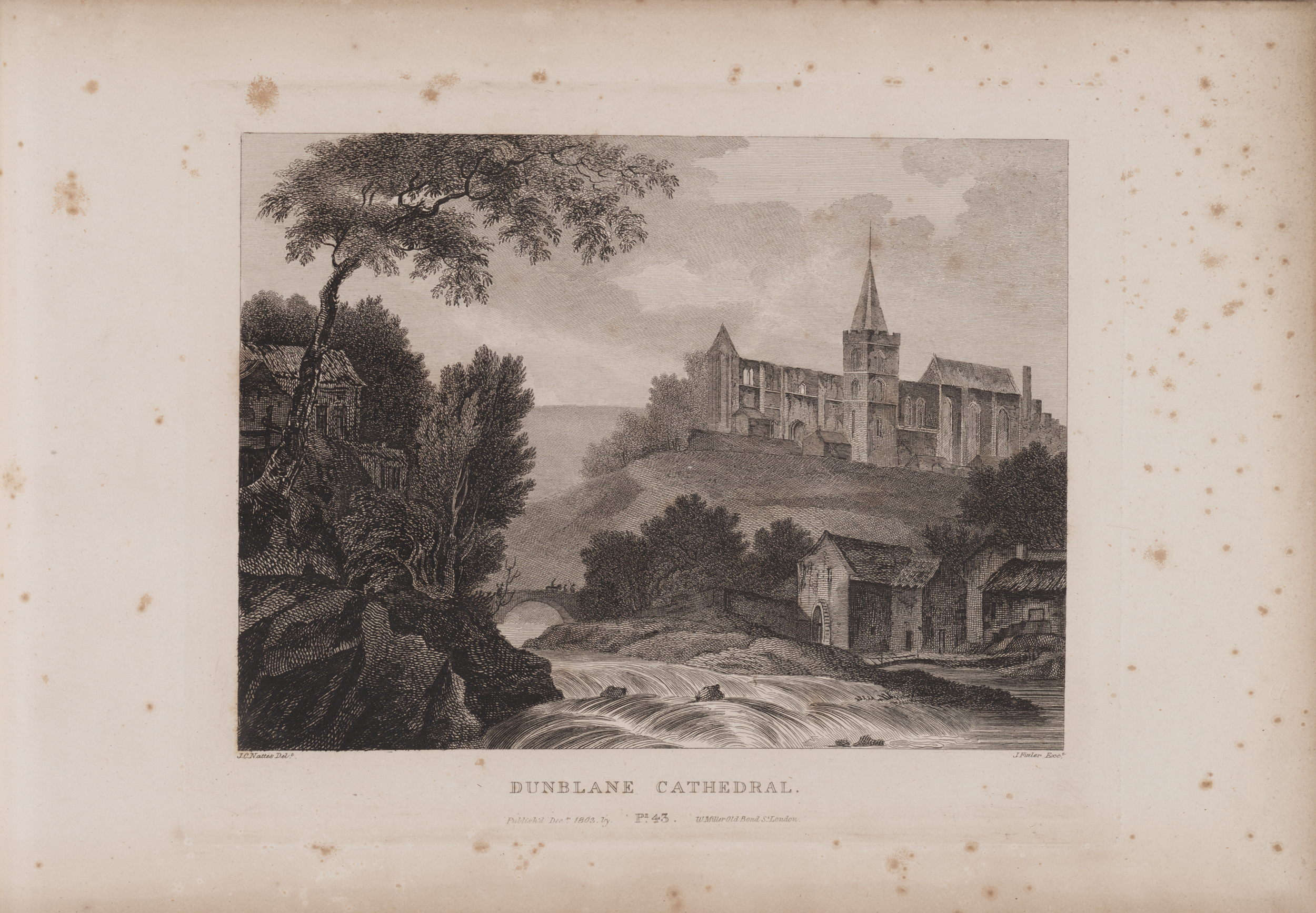
Etching of Dunblane Cathedral by James Fittler in Scotia Depicta

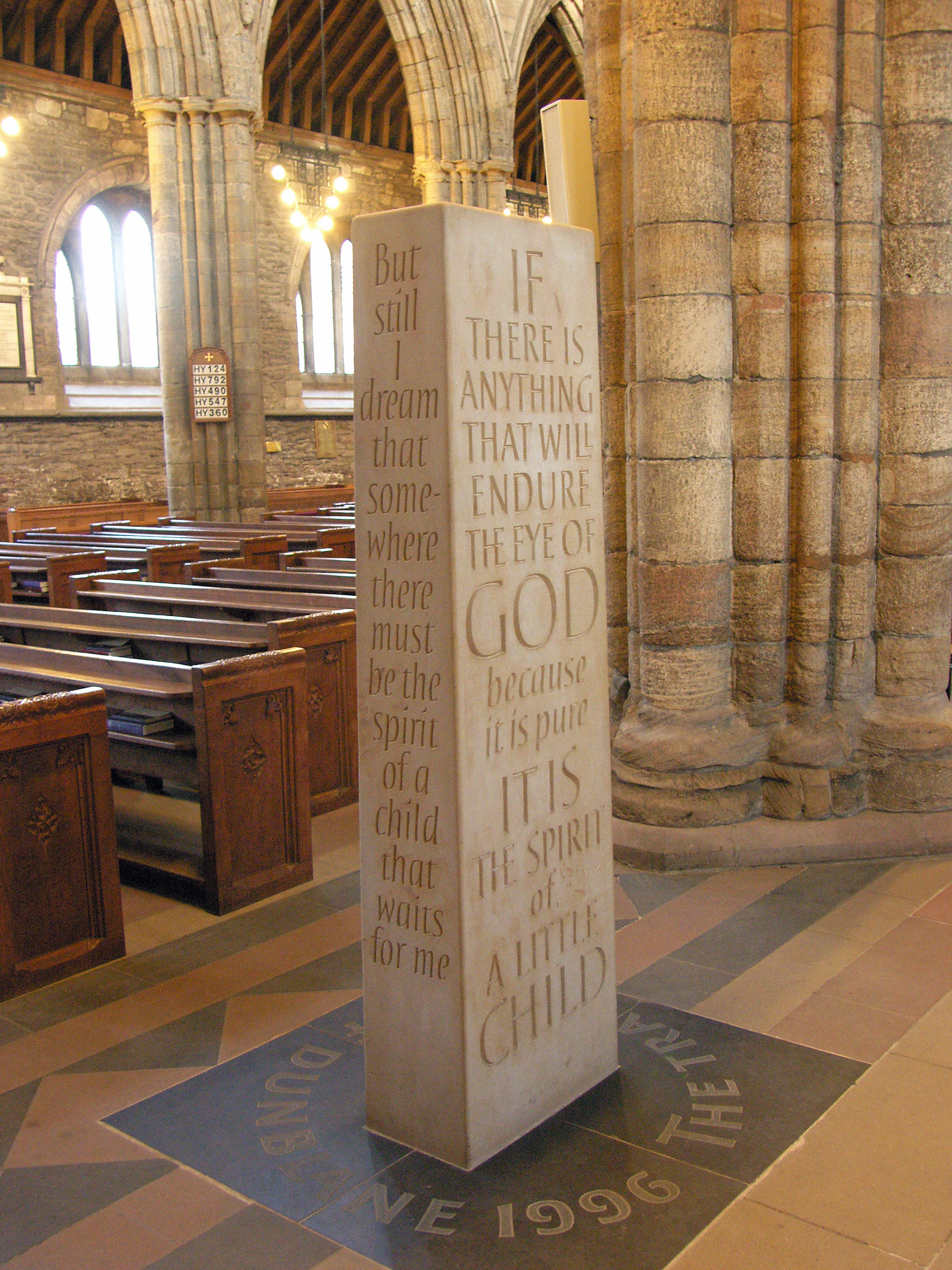
The Dunblane Commemoration standing stone

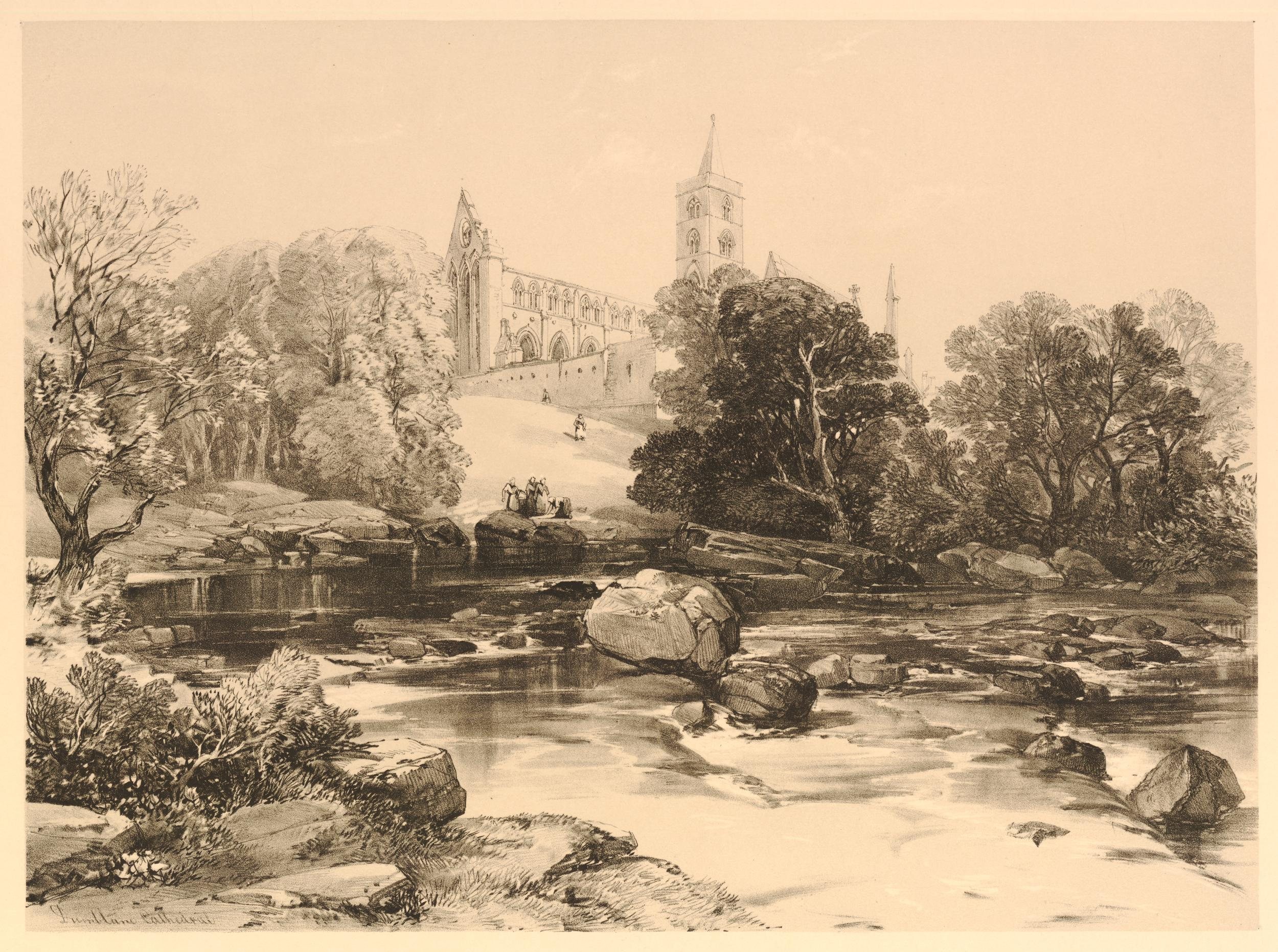
A mid-19th-century lithograph of the cathedral

== Notable people and events ==
Ministers and clergy

- Michael Potter, 1692
- James Pearson, 17th-century dean of Dunblane Cathedral
- The Very Rev James Cockburn, Moderator of the General Assembly of the Church of Scotland (1941–42)
- The Very Rev John Rodger Gray, Moderator of the General Assembly of the Church of Scotland (1977–78) (father of James Gray MP)

Burials

- Malise II, Mormaer of Strathearn
- Margaret Drummond, mistress of James IV of Scotland
- James Finlayson, Church of Scotland minister and writer
- Jane Stirling, pianist

Weddings

- In April 2015, tennis player and Dunblane native Andy Murray returned to his hometown to marry his long-term partner Kim Sears in a private service at the cathedral.

== See also ==
- List of Church of Scotland parishes
