= Scrabster Castle =

Former Scottish castle and Bishop's Palace

- Scrabster, Highland, Scotland
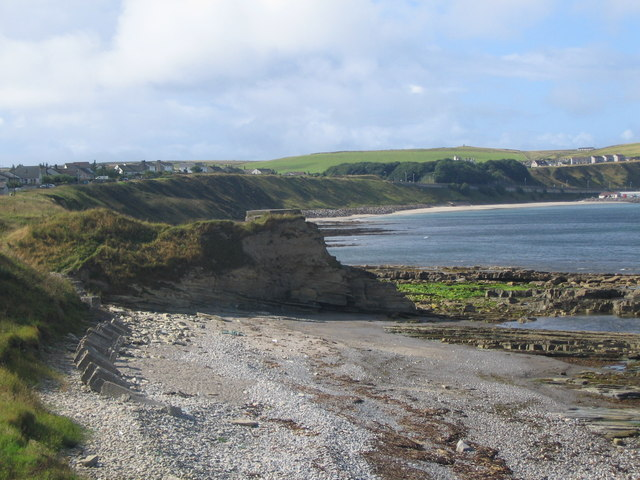
- Pillbox at Thurso Bay and mounds remaining from castle ruins, with Burnside in the background

Site information
- Open to the public: No
- Condition: Ruin

Location
- Scrabster Castle
- Coordinates: 58.601013°N 3.538941°W

Site history
- Built: c. 12th century
- Built by: Bishop of Caithness
- In use: 13th to 16th century

Scrabster Castle (Note: Also known as Bishop's Palace or Castle of Burnside) was a castle, near Burnside, about 0.5 miles (0.8 km) north and west of Thurso, and 0.5 miles (0.8 km) south of the village of Scrabster, Highland in Scotland, south of Thurso Bay. It is on an eroding promontory.

== History ==
Built by the Bishops of Caithness, the castle served as the Bishop's Palace for the bishops of Caithness. Bishop John of Caithness was mutilated by Harald Maddadsson, Mormaer of Caithness, in 1201, after being besieged at the castle, having his tongue and eyes removed for John's refusal to collect Peter's Pence, a tax of 1/10 of the income of every freeman. George Sinclair, 4th Earl of Caithness, seized the castle in 1544. The castle was later a royal castle. The castle was in ruins in the early 18th century.

== Structure ==
Scrabster Castle was a castle of enclosure, with a keep. There is a pillbox within the ruins.

There was a drawbridge towards the land. While erosion has partly destroyed the curtain wall, with other parts obscured by turf banks, short stretches of the outer face are exposed. The inner wall-face of a building about 5 metres (16 ft) square with a mural chamber is visible.
