= Peter Blackburn (bishop) =

Scottish scholar and prelate

Peter Blackburn (died 1616) was a Scottish scholar and prelate. He was the second Protestant Bishop of Aberdeen.

== Life ==
Born in the east of Scotland he studied at St Andrews University. He became a "regent" (lecturer) in Philosophy at the University of Glasgow in 1572 and continued this role until 1582. During this period he was promoted to Professor of Physics and Astronomy.

In 1582 he became minister of West Kirk in Aberdeen and was translated to the East Kirk in 1596. He was Moderator of the General Assembly of the Church of Scotland 1597/8. In 1600 he was made Chancellor of King's College, Aberdeen.

On 2 September 1600, King James VI of Scotland provided him as Bishop of Aberdeen, attaching to the appointment a seat in the Parliament of Scotland – an innovation which was denounced by Charles Ferme. Another part of the controversy was that no new bishop had been appointed since 1585, and Blackburn's provision, along with those of David Lindsay to the bishopric of Ross and George Gledstanes' provision to the bishopric of Caithness, broke this lull.

He was not formally consecrated until 1611, in a ceremony at Brechin Cathedral. He died at his house in Guestrow, Aberdeen, after a long illness on 14 June 1616, at Aberdeen. He is buried in the Kirk of St Nicholas in central Aberdeen.

== Family ==
He married Isobel Johnston, daughter of George Johnston of Johnston and Caskieben, and Christian Forbes, daughter of Lord Forbes, and sister of the poet Arthur Johnston. Their children included:

- Peter Blackburn of Dyce, their heir
- William Blackburn of Endowie
- Janet Blackburn, married Rev Alexander Rait of Kintore
- Archibald Blackburn, minister of St Nicholas Kirk, Aberdeen from 1601 to 1625
- Margaret Blackburn, married Andrew Adie, Principal of Marischal College
- Christian Blackburn, married Abraham Sibbald of Old Deer
- Elspet
- Isobel

== Publications ==
- A Treatise against James Gordon the Jesuit

== Notes ==
Religious titles
Preceded by David Cunningham	Bishop of Aberdeen; 1600–1616	Succeeded by Alexander Forbes
