= Alexander Forbes (bishop of Aberdeen) =

- Bishop of Aberdeen
- Church: Church of Scotland
- See: Diocese of Aberdeen
- In office: 1616–1617
- Predecessor: Peter Blackburn
- Successor: Patrick Forbes
- Previous post: Caithness (1604–1616)

Orders
- Consecration: 1611, at Brechin Cathedral (for Caithness)

Personal details
- Born: c. 1564 Scotland
- Died: 14 December 1617 Leith

Alexander Forbes (1564–1617) was a late 16th-century and early 17th-century senior Church of Scotland figure who was a Protestant Bishop of Aberdeen.

== Life ==
Born around 1564, he was the son of Helen Graham and her husband John Forbes of Ardmurdo House in the parish of Kinkell, Aberdeenshire near Inverurie.

He graduated with a Master of Arts degree in 1585 from the University of St Andrews, becoming minister of Fettercairn in the Mearns in 1588, using this position to take an active role in the church politics of the day. As a result, on 22 November 1604, he became Bishop of Caithness, retaining control of Fettercairn, something which created animosity with the anti-episcopal section of the Church of Scotland. Forbes took part in most national church meetings in this period, and was part of the meeting at Glasgow in 1610 which restored the old authority and powers of bishops. It was in the following year that he was finally consecrated as a bishop, in Brechin Cathedral.

He was alleged to have granted the consent of the Scottish church, dishonestly, to the absolution of the Catholic magnate, George Gordon, 1st Marquess of Huntly, carried out on the king's wishes by the Archbishop of Canterbury. It was perhaps for this reason that, in 1616, Forbes was translated as Bishop of Aberdeen in place of Bishop Blackburn. This position brought him the Chancellorship of King's College, Aberdeen. Forbes, however, attempted and failed to succeed George Gledstanes to the Archbishopric of St Andrews, a position he was beaten to by John Spottiswoode.

He died in Leith, near Edinburgh, on 14 December 1617, a figure of hate amongst the hard-line presbyterian section of the Scottish church.

== Family ==
He married Christian Straton of Crigie, and had ten children:

- William Forbes, their heir
- Col. Alexander Forbes
- John Forbes, parson at Auchterlea
- Captain Arthur Forbes
- George
- Bernard
- Margaret or Marjory, married Andrew Straton of Warburton, a cousin
- Isobel, married George Forbes of Athallan
- Jean, married Robert Leighton of Usan

Religious titles
| Preceded by George Gledstanes | Bishop of Caithness; 1604–1616 | Succeeded by John Abernethy |
| Preceded by Peter Blackburn | Bishop of Aberdeen; 1616–1617 | Succeeded by Patrick Forbes |
