= List of shipwrecks in October 1877 =

The list of shipwrecks in October 1877 includes ships sunk, foundered, grounded, or otherwise lost during October 1877.

== 1 October ==
List of shipwrecks: 1 October 1877
Ship	State	Description
Athalia	Norway	The barque ran aground in the Zuidergat. She was on a voyage from Hudiksvall to Amsterdam, North Holland, Netherlands. She was refloated and take in to the Nieuwe Diep.
Drachenfels	United Kingdom	The barge was holed by an anchor and sank at Harwich, Essex. She was on a voyage from Harwich to London.
Familia	Germany	The brig was driven ashore on Læsø, Denmark. She was on a voyage from Sundsvall, Sweden to Hartlepool, County Durham, United Kingdom. She was refloated and put in to Fredrikshavn, Denmark.
Irouaddy	France	The steamship ran aground at the entrance to the Suez Canal. She was refloated on 3 October.
Julia Reitz	Flag unknown	The schooner struck an uncharted rock 8 nautical miles (15 km) from the coast of Buton, Netherlands East Indies and was wrecked. She was on a voyage from Fuzhou, China to Adelaide, South Australia. She was a total loss.
Oden	United Kingdom	The steamship was driven ashore at "Carlos", Russia. She was on a voyage from Stockholm, Sweden to Riga, Russia.
Pearsons	United Kingdom	The schooner ran aground at Crail, Fife. She was refloated and found to be severely leaky.
Plover	United Kingdom	The steamship ran aground at Rotterdam, South Holland, Netherlands. She was on a voyage from London to Rotterdam. She was refloated and taken in to Hoek van Holland, South Holland.
Theodore Leontine	France	The schooner was run into by the steamship Virginia Schellizzi (United Kingdom) at Dunkirk, Nord and sank. Her crew were rescued. She was on a voyage from Dunkirk to Bilbao, Spain.
Vulcan	Norway	The barque ran aground in the Nieuwe Diep.

== 2 October ==
List of shipwrecks: 2 October 1877
Ship	State	Description
Albion	United Kingdom	The schooner was abandoned in the Atlantic Ocean. Her crew were rescued by the steamship Lion (United Kingdom). Albion was on a voyage from Betts Cove, Newfoundland Colony to Liverpool, Lancashire.
Backworth	United Kingdom	The brig was driven ashore at Dungeness, Kent. She was on a voyage from South Shields, County Durham to Bahia, Brazil. She was refloated the next day and towed in to Dover, Kent.
Georges	United Kingdom	The ship departed from Christiania, Norway for Swansea, Glamorgan. No further trace, reported missing.
Kent	United Kingdom	The Thames barge collided with the steamship Mesopotamia (United Kingdom) and sank in the River Thames at Rotherhithe, Kent.

== 3 October ==
List of shipwrecks: 3 October 1877
Ship	State	Description
Bremerhaven	Germany	The ship foundered in the Atlantic Ocean with some loss of life. Survivors were rescued by Lizzie Iredale (United Kingdom). Bremerhaven was on a voyage from London, United Kingdom to New York, United States.
Cape Clear, and Don Nicholas	United Kingdom; Bolivia	The full-rigged ship Cape Clear collided with the barque Don Nicholas at New York, United States. Both vessels were severely damaged.
Orion, and Tern	United Kingdom	The steamships collided at Antwerp, Belgium and were both severely damaged. Orion was on a voyage from London to Antwerp. Tern was on a voyage from Antwerp to Liverpool, Lancashire.
Seringapatam	United Kingdom	The ship was wrecked off "Kio Island", Russia.

== 4 October ==
List of shipwrecks: 4 October 1877
Ship	State	Description
Alma	United Kingdom	The barque was driven ashore at the mouth of the River Tay. Four of her crew were taken off by Neilson Taylor (United Kingdom). Alma was on a voyage from Dundee, Forfarshire to Grangemouth, Stirlingshire. She was refloated the next day with assistance from the tug Flying Scotsman (United Kingdom) and towed back to Dundee.
Cloud	United Kingdom	The ship was driven ashore and wrecked at Puckaster, Isle of Wight with the loss of one of her two crew. The survivor was arrested on suspicion of smuggling.
George Gray	United Kingdom	The Thames barge was run into by the steamship Albion (United Kingdom and sank in the River Thames at Bermondsey, Surrey. She was refloated.
Jafet	Austria-Hungary	The ship was sighted off Lamlash, Isle of Arran, United Kingdom whilst on a voyage from the Clyde to Algiers, Algeria. No further trace, reported missing.

== 5 October ==
List of shipwrecks: 5 October 1877
Ship	State	Description
Aigle	United States	The schooner was wrecked on Eday, Orkney Islands, United Kingdom. Her crew were rescued. She was on a voyage from Copenhagen, Denmark to Prince Edward Island, Canada.
Anna	Germany	The brigantine capsized off the Outer Hebrides, United Kingdom with the loss of three of her fourteen crew. Survivors were rescued on 7 October by the barque America (Norway). Anna was on a voyage from New York, United States to Hamburg. She was subsequently taken in to Glasgow, Renfrewshire, United Kingdom.
Firenza C.	Italy	The ship was driven ashore at Cape Henlopen, Delaware, United States. She was on a voyage from Philadelphia, Pennsylvania, United States to London, United Kingdom.
ARA Fulminate	Argentine Navy	The torpedo store ship exploded, caught fire and sank in the Luján River with the loss of eleven of her crew. The explosion of a torpedo was thought to be the cause.
Hertha	United States	The ship was driven ashore at Philadelphia, Pennsylvania. She was on a voyage from Livorno, Italy to Philadelphia.
Nicolaus	Germany	The ship was driven ashore and wrecked at Beaufort, South Carolina, United States. She was on a voyage from Hamburg to Charleston, South Carolina.
Scotia Queen	United Kingdom	The ship ran aground on the Dunaverty Rock, off the coast of Argyllshire. She was on a voyage from Glasgow, Renfrewshire to Trinidad. She was refloated the next day and towed in to the Clyde.
Tioga	United States	The steamer caught fire and burned out, sinking the next day in Lake Ontario near Point Pelee, Ontario, Canada. The crew escaped to barges she was towing and they were brought in by Badger State (United States).

== 6 October ==
List of shipwrecks: 6 October 1877
Ship	State	Description
Agil	Canada Canada	The schooner was driven ashore and wrecked on Green Holm, Shetland Islands, United Kingdom. Her crew were rescued.
Constitution	United States	The ship caught fire whilst on a voyage from New York to New Orleans, Louisiana. She put back to New York. The fire was extinguished.
Ella	United Kingdom	The steamship collided with the steamship Absalom (Denmark) and was beached on the Ballasters Plaat. She was on a voyage from Gothenburg, Sweden to Antwerp, Belgium.
Jane	United Kingdom	The ship was wrecked at Cairnbulg, Aberdeenshire. Her crew were rescued. She was on a voyage from Cullen, Moray to Leith, Lothian.
Leander	United Kingdom	The schooner departed from Liverpool, Lancashire for São Miguel Island, Azores. No further trace, presumed foundered with the loss of all hands.
Thor	Norway	The brig ran aground on the Brake Sand. She was on a voyage from Drammen to Cowes, Isle of Wight, United Kingdom. She was refloated and taken in to The Downs.
Wellhaven	Norway	The barque was abandoned in the Atlantic Ocean (45°44′N 32°50′W). Her crew were rescued by Agathe (United Kingdom). Wellhaven was on a voyage from Miramichi, New Brunswick, Canada to Plymouth, Devon, United Kingdom.

== 7 October ==
List of shipwrecks: 7 October 1877
Ship	State	Description
Grace Wallace	United Kingdom	The schooner ran aground on the Smerby Rock. She was on a voyage from Glasgow, Renfrewshire to Campbeltown, Argyllshire.
Lima	United Kingdom	The steamship ran aground in the Seine. She was refloated with assistance.
Roach	United Kingdom	The Mersey Flat collided with the steamship City of Chester and sank at Liverpool, Lancashire. She was later refloated.
Roland	Germany	The steamship was driven ashore on Terschelling, Friesland, Netherlands. She was on a voyage from Bordeaux, Gironde, France to Antwerp, Belgium. She was refloated. She was later refloated.
Shark	United Kingdom	The steamship ran aground in the Seine.
Sutherland Cross	United Kingdom	The fishing boat was driven ashore at Wells-next-the-Sea, Norfolk.

== 8 October ==
List of shipwrecks: 8 October 1877
Ship	State	Description
Albertine	Germany	The schooner was driven ashore and wrecked at Dranske. Her crew were rescued.
Blue Jacket	United Kingdom	The Mersey Flat was driven ashore at New Brighton, Cheshire.
Cornwall	United Kingdom	The steamship ran aground in the River Avon underneath the Clifton Suspension Bridge. She was on a voyage from Bristol, Gloucestershire to New York, United States. She was refloated and put back to Bristol.
Corsair	United Kingdom	The barque was sighted in The Downs whilst on a voyage from Sunderland, County Durham to Rio de Janeiro, Brazil. No further trace, reported missing.
Doris Gerdes	Germany	The barque was driven ashore at Hasle, Bornholm, Denmark, She was on a voyage from Copenhagen, Denmark to Riga, Russia.
Emerald Isle	United Kingdom	The ship struck rocks off the Isle of Whithorn, Wigtownshire and sank. Her crew survived. She was on a voyage from Maryport, Cumberland to Larne, County Antrim.
Francesco Curro	Italy	The barque was run into by the full-rigged ship Malta (United Kingdom) and sank at Queenstown, County Cork, United Kingdom. Her crew were rescued by a pilot boat. Francesco Curro was on a voyage from Philadelphia, Pennsylvania, United States to Queenstown.
Sunshine	United Kingdom	The tug was driven from her moorings at Liverpool, Lancashire. She collided with the tugs British King and Enterprise (both United Kingdom) and was beached. She was refloated and taken in to Liverpool.
604	France	The fishing boat foundered off Calais with the loss of all nine crew.
Unnamed	France	The fishing vessel was wrecked on the Goodwin Sands, Kent, United Kingdom with the loss of all hands.

== 9 October ==
List of shipwrecks: 9 October 1877
Ship	State	Description
Albert William	United Kingdom	The ship driven ashore at Stenåsa, Öland, Sweden. She was on a voyage from Stockholm, Sweden to Australia.
C. D. W.	Sweden	The barque was wrecked in the Cayman Islands. Her crew were rescued. She was on a voyage from Rio de Janeiro, Brazil to New Orleans, Louisiana United States.
Cecilia	Spain	The schooner was wrecked at Bilbao. Her crew were rescued. She was on a voyage from Scotland to Bilbao.
Clara	Germany	The ship was driven ashore and wrecked on Bermuda. She was on a voyage from Puerto Plata, Dominican Republic to Hamburg, Germany.
Expert	Germany	The schooner was wrecked on the Corton Sand, in the North Sea off the coast of Suffolk, United Kingdom. Her crew were rescued by the smack Ringleader (United Kingdom). Expert was on a voyage from Hartlepool, County Durham, United Kingdom to Tönning.
Olga	Flag unknown	The ship was driven ashore in the River Nene. She was on a voyage from a Baltic port to Wisbech, Cambridgeshire, United Kingdom. She was refloated and towed in to Wisbech.
Sophia	Germany	The ship was abandoned in a sinking condition in the Sound of Kalmar. She was on a voyage from Stockholm, Sweden to Stralsund.
Sünne	Ottoman Navy	Russo-Turkish War: The Akka-class gunboat was sunk by torpedoes at the mouth of the Danube.
Unnamed	Flag unknown	The ship foundered in the North Sea off the Newarp Lightship ( Trinity House) with the loss of all hands.

== 10 October ==
List of shipwrecks: 10 October 1877
Ship	State	Description
Arcturus	United States	The ship was driven ashore at New York. She was on a voyage from New York to Antwerp, Belgium. She was refloated and resumed her voyage.
Arthur	United Kingdom	The steamship ran aground at IJmuiden, North Holland, Netherlands. She was refloated.
Dauntless	United Kingdom	The schooner was run down and sunk at Montevideo, Uruguay by the steamship Euclid (Brazil). All on board were rescued.
Fardig	Sweden	The brig was wrecked. She was on a voyage from Newcastle upon Tyne, Northumberland, United Kingdom to Visby.
Felix	Sweden	The schooner was driven ashore at "Kallebodestrand". She was on a voyage from Oscarshamn to Copenhagen, Denmark.
Othello	United Kingdom	The ship ran aground on the Krishna Shoal, in the Bay of Bengal. She was on a voyage from Liverpool, Lancashire to Rangoon, Burma. She was later refloated with assistance and taken in to Rangoon.
Rurico	Norway	The barque was abandoned in the Atlantic Ocean (39°55′N 13°03′W). Her ten crew were rescued by Craig Ewan (United Kingdom).
Sunny Bank	United Kingdom	The ship departed from Lisbon, Portugal for Newport, Monmouthshire. Presumed subsequently foundered in the Bay of Biscay with the loss of all eight crew. A boat from the ship washed up at Audierne, Finistère, France in December.
Union	Germany	The schooner collided with Magdalene (Germany) and sank off Texel, North Holland, Netherlands. Union was on a voyage from Königsberg to Bristol, Gloucestershire, United Kingdom.

== 11 October ==
List of shipwrecks: 11 October 1877
Ship	State	Description
Alida en Hendrika	Netherlands	The ship was driven ashore at Pillau, Germany. Her crew were rescued. She was on a voyage from Charlestown, Cornwall, United Kingdom to Pillau.
Alma Marie	France	The lugger was driven ashore at Breaksea Point, Glamorgan, United Kingdom.
Attalus	Norway	The brig was driven ashore and wrecked near Kristiansand with the loss of all but one of her crew. She was on a voyage from Louvain, Flemish Brabant, Belgium to Arendal.
Ann	(United Kingdom of Great Britain and Ireland) Guernsey	The brig ran aground on the Maplin Sand, in the North Sea off the coast of Essex. She was on a voyage from Guernsey to London. She was refloated with assistance from the tug Valiant (United Kingdom).
Coleridge	United Kingdom	The brig was driven ashore on Bere Island, County Cork. She was on a voyage from Castletown, Kinure to a French port. She was later refloated.
Dove	United Kingdom	The sloop was driven ashore at Havre de Grâce, Seine-Inférieure, France. She was on a voyage from Portsmouth, Hampshire to Rouen, Seine-Inférieure.
Fanny Breslauer	United Kingdom	The schooner was driven ashore at Vestervig, Denmark. She was on a voyage from Hull, Yorkshire to a Norwegian port. She was refloated and taken in to the Agger Channel.
Jessore	United Kingdom	The ship was run into by the steamship Consett (United Kingdom and sank 150 nautical miles (280 km) west of Cape Clear Island, County Cork. All 64 people on board were rescued by Consett. Jessore was on a voyage from Liverpool, Lancashire to Melbourne, Victoria.
Molly	Germany	The barque ran aground on the Dunkirk Banks, off the coast of Nord, France and sprang a leak. She was on a voyage from Antwerp, Belgium to Buenos Aires, Argentina. She put back to Vlissingen, Zeeland, Netherlands.
Preciosa	Sweden	The brig was wrecked at Lemvig, Denmark with the loss of all hands. She was on a voyage from Middlesbrough, Yorkshire, United Kingdom to Malmö.
Snowdonia	United Kingdom	The barque was sighted off Dover, Kent whilst on a voyage from Sunderland, County Durham to Buenos Aires, Argentina and Bombay, India. Subsequently foundered in the English Channel with the loss of all 25 crew. Wreckage washed up on the coasts of Dorset and the Isle of Wight in late October. She was on her maiden voyage.
Union	Flag unknown	The ship was wrecked at Lemvig. She was on a voyage from Antwerp, Belgium to Saint Petersburg, Russia.

== 12 October ==
List of shipwrecks: 12 October 1877
Ship	State	Description
Ayton	United Kingdom	The steamship was driven ashore at Cape Clarinza, Greece. She was on a voyage from Alexandria, Egypt to Patras, Greece. She was refloated with assistance from Wizard (Royal Navy) and taken in to Zakynthos, Greece.
Rex	Germany	The barque was abandoned in a sinking condition. Her eight crew were rescued by Leoni (United Kingdom).
Rover	United Kingdom	The ship ran aground on an anchor in the River Barrow and was severely damaged. She was on a voyage from New Ross, County Wexford to Wexford.
Veritas	Denmark	The barque was wrecked at "Brockhuus". Her crew were rescued. She was on a voyage from Bahia, Brazil to Copenhagen.
William van Name	United States	The ship was wrecked on the Seven Stones Reef, Cornwall, United Kingdom. She was on a voyage from New York to Leith, Lothian, United Kingdom.
Zealous	United Kingdom	The steamship ran aground at Maassluis, South Holland, Netherlands. She was on a voyage from Rotterdam, South Holland to Harwich, Essex. She was refloated and resumed her voyage.

== 13 October ==
List of shipwrecks: 13 October 1877
Ship	State	Description
Kin Shan	United Kingdom	The ship departed from Cardiff, Glamorgan for Bombay, India. No further trace, presumed foundered with the loss of all hands, possibly in a gale on 14 or 15 October.
Marens Minde	Denmark	The schooner was driven ashore at Burntisland, Fife, United Kingdom with the loss of one of her six crew.
Mathilda	Sweden	The barque ran aground on the Kratzsand, in the North Sea off the German coast. She was on a voyage from Kalmar to Boulogne, Pas-de-Calais, France.
Portland	United States	Portland The wooden schooner ran aground in Lake Huron near Presque Isle, Michigan, and was destroyed by a storm shortly afterwards. Her wreck lies in 6 feet (1.8 m) of water at 45.248817°N 83.4075°W.
Stockton Packet	United Kingdom	The ship was driven ashore and wrecked at the mouth of the River Tees.
Ville de Dieppe	France	The barque ran aground in the Gironde. She was on a voyage from Hartlepool, County Durham, United Kingdom to Bordeaux, Gironde.
Yeves	Spain	The schooner was driven ashore in Bigbury Bay with the loss of one of her eight crew. Survivors were rescued by the Coastguard using rocket apparatus.
Dunbar Lifeboat	Royal National Lifeboat Institution	The capsized off Dunbar, Lothian with the loss of two of her crew.

== 14 October ==
List of shipwrecks: 14 October 1877
Ship	State	Description
Aberdonian	United Kingdom	The schooner ran aground at Lindisfarne, Northumberland. She was on a voyage from London to Aberdeen. She was refloated with assistance and taken in to Lindisfarne.
Agnes	United Kingdom	The schooner was driven ashore and damaged in the Cattewater.
Albion	United Kingdom	The schooner was driven ashore and wrecked in the Cattewater. Both crew on board survived.
Alert	Trinity House	The steamship was damaged at Milbay, Devon.
Alexandra	United Kingdom	The ship was driven ashore at Burnham-on-Sea, Somerset and was abandoned by her crew.
Angela, and Guglielmo	Spain; Italy	The brig Guglielmo was driven into the barque Angela at Plymouth, Devon. Both vessels were damaged.
Anthracite	United Kingdom	The brig was driven ashore and wrecked at Trefusis Point, Cornwall. Her crew were rescued. She was on a voyage from Leith, Lothian to Demerara, British Guiana.
Atalanta	United Kingdom	The ship was driven ashore at the Mumbles, Glamorgan. Her crew survived.
Barganz, Calliope, Hannah Crasdale, and Havre	Flag unknown United Kingdom; United Kingdom; France	Barganz, Calliope and the barque Havre were driven from their moorings at Cardiff, Glamorgan. All three collided with the schooner Hannah Crasdale, which was severely damaged.
Bohemian Girl	United Kingdom	The schooner was driven ashore in the Cattewater.
Charles Arch	United Kingdom	The pilot boat was reported missing from Cardiff.
Charles E. Hoard	United Kingdom	The ship was driven ashore at the Mumbles. Her crew survived.
Chimera	United Kingdom	The schooner was driven ashore at Torquay, Devon.
Cleopatra	United Kingdom	The ship was abandoned in the Bay of Biscay. Her five crew were rescued by Olga (United Kingdom), which lost six of her crew effecting the rescue. Cleopatra was being towed from Alexandria, Egypt to London, carrying Cleopatra's Needle. She was towed in to Ferrol, Spain on 19 October by the steamship Fitzmaurice (United Kingdom).
Czarewitch	United Kingdom	The brig was driven ashore and damaged in the Cattewater. She was on a voyage from Huelva, Spain to Plymouth. She was refloated on 16 October.
Dagmar	United Kingdom	The barque was driven ashore at Stonehaven, Aberdeenshire. She was refloated on 16 October.
Doctor Petermann	Germany	The barque was severely damaged at Plymouth. She was on a voyage from Falmouth, Cornwall to South Shields, County Durham, United Kingdom.
Eleanor Davidson	United Kingdom	The snow departed from Swansea, Glamorgan for Belfast, County Antrim. No further trace, reported missing.
Elizabeth Ann	United Kingdom	The ship was driven ashore at Falmouth.
Emmett	United Kingdom	The yacht was driven ashore and wrecked in Deadman's Bay. Her four crew were rescued.
Europa	Regia Marina	The corvette was driven ashore at Plymouth. She was refloated.
Farnley Hall	United Kingdom	The steamship was damaged in a gale at Falmouth.
Fearnot	United Kingdom	The ship was driven ashore at Falmouth. She was on a voyage from Falmouth to Swansea.
I. W. T.	United Kingdom	The ship was driven ashore at Falmouth. She was on a voyage from Santander, Spain to Falmouth.
Jane Elkin	New Zealand	The 25-ton ketch was wrecked when it hit a boulder while crossing the bar at the mouth of the Patea River.
Jannet and Jane, or Janet and Janet	United Kingdom	The schooner was driven ashore and damaged in the Cattewater. She was on a voyage from Plymouth to Portmadoc, Caernarfonshire.
John Williams	United Kingdom	The pilot boat was wrecked at Breaksea Point, Glamorgan. All on board were rescued by another pilot boat.
Jolani, Paul Thorman, and Thessalia	Kingdom of Hawaii; Germany; Greece	The barque Paul Thorman and the brig Thessalia collided at Plymouth and were both damaged. Thessalia was driven in to the barque Jolani, which was also damaged.
Joseph and Mary	United Kingdom	The schooner was driven into the yacht Whisper (United Kingdom) in the Cattewater and was damaged.
Jubilee, and Statira	United Kingdom	The steamship Jubilee was driven from her moorings at Cardiff and collided with the steamship Statira, which was severely damaged. Statira was placed under repair.
Lady Avenel	UKGBI	The brigantine was driven ashore and severely damaged in the Cattewater. She was on a voyage from Lisbon Portugal to Plymouth.
Lady Selbourne	United Kingdom	The barquentine was driven ashore and severely damaged in the Cattewater. She was refloated, towed to Sutton Pool and beached.
Loch Cree	United Kingdom	The barque was driven ashore at Sunderland, County Durham. She was on a voyage from San Francisco, California, United States to Sunderland. She was refloated with the assistance of a number of tugs.
Lorely	United Kingdom	The steamship was damaged in a gale at Falmouth.
Mabel	United Kingdom	The yacht sank in the Cattewater.
Marchioness	United Kingdom	The schooner was driven ashore near Burntisland, Fife. Her crew were rescued. She was refloated with assistance from the tug Fiery Cross(United Kingdom) and take in to Burntisland.
Margaret	United Kingdom	The Thames barge ran aground on the Shoebury Sand, in the Thames Estuary and sank.
Mary Emma	United Kingdom	The ship was driven ashore at Burnham-on-Sea.
Moderator	United Kingdom	The ship was driven ashore at Burnham-on-Sea.
Newcomen	United Kingdom	The steamship was driven ashore at Dartmouth, Devon.
R. H. Jones	United Kingdom	The barque sank at Plymouth, Devon with the loss of all but one of her nineteen crew. The survivor was rescued by HMS Turquoise (Royal Navy). R. H. Jones was on a voyage from Bremen, Germany to Newport, Monmouthshire.
Rothesay	United Kingdom	The steamship was driven ashore and wrecked on The Mewstone, off the coast of Devon. Her eleven crew were rescued. She was on a voyage from Caen, Calvados, France to Cardiff.
R. W. T.	United Kingdom	The ship was driven ashore at Falmouth.
Sans Souci	France	The brigantine was driven from her moorings in Plymouth Sound into the Cattewater and was severely damaged. She was on a voyage from Saint-Brieuc, Côtes-du-Nord to Cardiff.
Sarah	Canada	The full-rigged ship was wrecked on the Middle Mouse Rocks, off the coast of Anglesey, United Kingdom. Her crew were rescued by the Cemaes lifeboat Ashtonian ( Royal National Lifeboat Institution). Sarah was on a voyage from Quebec City, Canada to Liverpool, Lancashire. She was refloated the next day by the tug Great Western (United Kingdom) and towed in to Liverpool, Lancashire, United Kingdom.
Sarah	United Kingdom	The Yorkshire Billyboy was driven ashore and wrecked at Salcombe, Devon. All on board were rescued. She was on a voyage from Teignmouth, Devon to Antwerp, Belgium.
Seagull	United Kingdom	The yacht was wrecked at Plymouth Hoe, Devon.
St. Roche	France	The lugger was driven ashore at Trebitherick Point, near Padstow, Cornwall with the loss of her captain. She was later refloated.
Swan of the Exe	United Kingdom	The ship was driven ashore at Lympstone, Devon and broke her back.
Tamar	United Kingdom	The schooner was driven ashore and sank at Keyham, Devon. Her four crew were rescued. She was on a voyage from Keyham to Swansea.
Terrier	United Kingdom	The steamship was sighted off Port Talbot, Glamorgan whilst on a voyage from Swansea to Highbridge, Somerset. Presumed foundered with the loss of all five or six hands. Wreckage from the ship washed up on the Welsh coast.
Trio	United Kingdom	The brigantine was driven ashore at Singleton, Glamorgan. Her crew survived. She was refloated on 18 October and taken in to the Mumbles.
Vivid	United Kingdom	The ship foundered off Porthcawl, Glamorgan. She was on a voyage from Penarth, Glamorgan to Barnstaple, Devon and/or Penzance, Cornwall.
Whisper	United Kingdom	The pilot cutter was driven ashore and severely damaged in the Cattewater. She was a total loss.
Zeemanshoop	Netherlands	The brig was driven ashore and severely damaged at St. Mawes, Cornwall. She was on a voyage from New Calabar to Rotterdam, South Holland. She was refloated on 19 October and taken in to Falmouth in a severely leaky condition.
No. 4	United Kingdom	The pilot boat was driven ashore and wrecked a Plymouth.
Unnamed	United Kingdom	The yacht sank in the Cattewater.
Unnamed	United Kingdom	The fishing boat was abandoned off Teignmouth, Devon. Her ten crew were rescued by the Teignmouth Lifeboat China ( Royal National Lifeboat Institution).
Unnamed	Spain	The schooner was driven ashore at Plymouth with the loss of one of her eight crew.
Unnamed	France	The barque was driven against a bridge at Bristol, Gloucestershire, United Kingdom and was severely damaged.
Unnamed	United Kingdom	The steamship was driven ashore at Burnham-on-Sea.
Unnamed	United Kingdom	The collier sank at Bristol.
Unnamed	France	The schooner was driven ashore at the Mumbles. Her crew survived.
Two unnamed vessels	United Kingdom	The sloop sank in the Humber.
Two unnamed vessels	United Kingdom	The ships were driven onto the Sprat Ridge Sands, in the Bristol Channel off the north Devon coast and sank.

== 15 October ==
List of shipwrecks: 15 October 1877
Ship	State	Description
Acme	United Kingdom	The ship was driven ashore at Cardiff, Glamorgan. She was on a voyage from Quebec City, Canada to Cardiff.
Ann	United Kingdom	The ship was driven ashore at Camber Sands, Sussex. She was on a voyage from Guernsey, Channel Islands to Rye, Sussex.
Cambridge	Royal Navy	The training ship was driven from her moorings at Plymouth.
Charles	United Kingdom	The brig was driven ashore and wrecked at Thurso, Caithness. Her eight crew were rescued by rocket apparatus. She was on a voyage from "Sandarn", on the Baltic coast to Irvine, Ayrshire.
Damietta	United Kingdom	The steamship was abandoned in the North Sea 40 nautical miles (74 km) off South Shields, County Durham. Her crew were rescued by the steamship Annie Ainslie (United Kingdom) and Damietta subsequently foundered. She was on a voyage from Danzig, Germany to Stockton-on-Tees, County Durham.
Emanus	United Kingdom	The schooner foundered in Thurso Bay with the loss of all four crew.
Francesquina	United Kingdom	The barque beached between Sines and St. Ubes, Portugal with the loss of a crew member. She was on a voyage from Tripoli, Ottoman Tripolitania to Cardiff. She subsequently became a wreck.
Friendship	United Kingdom	The lugger was driven ashore at Lamlash, Isle of Arran. Her three crew were rescued.
Glencaple	United Kingdom	The brig foundered 30 nautical miles (56 km) off Ouessant, Finistère, France. Her crew were rescued by the schooner Hermione (France). Glencaple was on a voyage from London to Cette, Hérault, France.
Gwydr	United Kingdom	The Mersey Flat sank at Beaumaris, Anglesey. Her three crew survived. She was on a voyage from Carnarvon Bay to Liverpool, Lancashire.
Johanna	Norway	The schooner was abandoned in the Firth of Forth. She subsequently struck the Beamer Rock and sank. She was on a voyage from Grangemouth, Stirlingshire, United Kingdom to Dram.
Knapton Hall	United Kingdom	The steamship collided with the barque Loch Fyne (United Kingdom) and sank in the English Channel with the loss of twelve of the twenty people on boatd.
Lancaster	United Kingdom	The brig was abandoned in the North Sea. Her crew were rescued. She was on a voyage from Seaham, County Durham to London.
L'Auguste	France	The ship was driven ashore at Ramsgate, Kent, United Kingdom. Her crew were rescued. She was on a voyage from Nantes, Loire-Inférieure to Boulogne, Pas-de-Calais.
Mary Ann	United Kingdom	The barque was driven ashore at the mouth of the River Lune. She was on a voyage from Miramichi, New Brunswick, Canada to Glasson Dock, Lancashire. She broke up the next day and was abandoned by her crew, who were rescued by at tug.
Orpheus	Norway	The ship was abandoned in the Dogger Bank. Her crew were rescued by the fishing smack Elizabeth (United Kingdom). Orpheus was on a voyage from Hudson Bay to London.
Planet	United Kingdom	The steamship was driven ashore and wrecked at Saltash, Cornwall.
Pauleori	France	The schooner was driven ashore and wrecked at Rickham Head, Devon, United Kingdom.
Prince	United Kingdom	The schooner was abandoned in the Bay of Biscay. Her crew were rescued by the brig Emily (United Kingdom). Prince was on a voyage from Safi, Morocco to Falmouth, Cornwall.
Sarah	United States	The schooner was driven ashore at Exmouth, Devon. Her crew survived.
Sarah	United Kingdom	The ship was wrecked off Sidmouth, Devon.
Thomas Charles	United Kingdom	The ship was abandoned at sea. Her crew were rescued. She was on a voyage from Königsberg, Germany to Gloucester. She subsequently foundered.
Venture	United Kingdom	The yacht was driven ashore and severely damaged at Greenock, Renfrewshire.
Victor	United Kingdom	The schooner was driven ashore and wrecked at Staithes, Yorkshire. Her crew were rescued. She was on a voyage from Hartlepool, County Durham to Folkestone, Kent.
17 Mai	Norway	The ship ran aground off Tanager, Denmark and sank. Her crew survived She was on a voyage from Middlesbrough, Yorkshire to Stavanger.
No. 28	United Kingdom	The pilot boat was driven against the quayside in the Bute Docks, Cardiff and sank.
Two unnamed vessels	Flags unknown	The ships were driven ashore at Breaksea Point, Glamorgan.
Two unnamed vessels	United Kingdom	The Thames barges foundered in the Thames Estuary, each with the loss of all hands. They were both on a voyage from London to the River Medway.

== 16 October ==
List of shipwrecks: 16 October 1877
Ship	State	Description
Albatross	Norway	The derelict barque was driven ashore at Lemvig, Denmark.
Coquette	Portugal	The schooner was abandoned in the Atlantic Ocean. Her crew were rescued. She was on a voyage from the Cape Verde Islands to Lisbon.
Emaus	United Kingdom	The schooner foundered in Wick Bay with the loss of all hands.
Foam	United Kingdom	The smack was driven ashore at Stranraer, Wigtownshire.
John Parker	Canada	The ship sprang a leak and foundered in the Atlantic Ocean. Her crew were rescued by Squander (United Kingdom).
Mary Ann	United Kingdom	The ship was driven ashore at Fleetwood, Lancashire.
Swift	United Kingdom	The ship foundered in the Bristol Channel off Lundy Island, Devon. Her crew survived. She was on a voyage from Swansea, Glamorgan to Hull, Yorkshire.
William Van Name	United States	The vessel struck the Seven Stones Reef, Cornwall, United Kingdom. Her twelve crew were rescued by the schooner Caroline (United Kingdom).

== 17 October ==
List of shipwrecks: 17 October 1877
Ship	State	Description
Aden	United Kingdom	The ship capsized in the Atlantic Ocean. Her crew were rescued on 20 October by the schooner Annie Whiting (United States). Aden was on a voyage from Miramichi, New Brunswick, Canada to Belfast, County Antrim.
Emily Lowther	Canada	The ship ran aground at Cardiff, Glamorgan, United Kingdom. She was on a voyage from Gloucester, United Kingdom to Pensacola, Florida, United States. She was refloated and taken in to Newport, Monmouthshire, United Kingdom.
Llen	Norway	She was driven ashore at Stenåsa, Öland, Sweden. She was refloated and taken in to Oskarshamn, Sweden.
Medina	United Kingdom	The barque was driven ashore at Cape Spartel, Morocco. She was on a voyage from Newcastle upon Tyne, Northumberland to Cartagena, Spain.
Princess of Wales	United Kingdom	The schooner was wrecked on "Edoskagen", near Kristiansand, Norway. Her crew were rescued by the steamship Ganger Rolf (Norway). Princess of Wales was on a voyage from Trondheim, Norway to Liverpool, Lancashire.

== 18 October ==
List of shipwrecks: 18 October 1877
Ship	State	Description
Clara	Germany	The brig was driven ashore and wrecked at Thisted, Denmark. Her crew were rescued. She was on a voyage from Sunderland, County Durham, United Kingdom to Stettin.
Gravelinoise	United Kingdom	The schooner sprang a leak and foundered in the North Sea off Orfordness, Suffolk, United Kingdom. Her crew were rescued by the steamship Zaimis (United Kingdom).
Lord Duffryn	United Kingdom	The brigantine ran aground at Wexford. She was on a voyage from Saint John, New Brunswick, Canada to Wexford. She was refloated.

== 19 October ==
List of shipwrecks: 19 October 1877
Ship	State	Description
Cleone	United States	The 347-ton whaler, a barque, was lost in Saint Lawrence Bay in the Bering Sea during a heavy gale.
Pet	United Kingdom	The schooner was abandoned in the North Sea. Her crew were rescued by the barque Emma (United Kingdom). Pet was on a voyage from Danzig, Germany to Wick, Caithness. She was subsequently towed in to Gothenburg, Sweden in a derelict condition.
Petronella	Italy	The barque was wrecked at Gabarus, Nova Scotia, Canada. She was on a voyage from Philadelphia, Pennsylvania, United States to Cork, United Kingdom.
No. 11	United Kingdom	The pilot boat was run down and sunk by the steamship Menelaus (Flag unknown) at Liverpool, Lancashire. Her crew were rescued.

== 20 October ==
List of shipwrecks: 20 October 1877
Ship	State	Description
Alma	United Kingdom	The brig was abandoned at sea. Her crew were rescued by Francesca Bellagamba (Flag unknown). Alma was on a voyage from Cardiff, Glamorgan to Gravesend, Kent.
Elis	Sweden	The ship was driven ashore on Arholma. She was on a voyage from Luleå to Gibraltar. She was refloated and put in to Stockholm.
Marian	United Kingdom	The barque caught fire and was abandoned 100 nautical miles (190 km) east of the Grand Banks of Newfoundland. Her 21 crew were rescued by Uno (Norway). Marian was on a voyage from Quebec City, Canada to London.
Restless	United Kingdom	The ship was driven ashore at Liverpool, Lancashire. She was on a voyage from Mossoró, Brazil to Liverpool. She was refloated.
Serena	United Kingdom	The schooner was run into by the barque Famiglie (Flag unknown) and sank in the Clyde at Greenock, Renfrewshire. Her crew were rescued.
Valyrien	Russia	The ship departed from Vadsø, Norway for the Firth of Forth. No further trace, reported missing.
Waucoma	United Kingdom	The schooner ran aground on Wallace's Rock, in the Belfast Lough. She was on a voyage from Belfast, County Antrim to Charleston, South Carolina, United States. She was refloated and beached at Ballywalter, County Antrim. Her cre were rescued.
Zingara	Norway	The ship was abandoned in the Atlantic Ocean. Her seventeen crew were rescued by Skjerkholt (Norway). Zingara was on a voyage from Quebec City, Canada to London, United Kingdom.
Four unnamed vessels	Flags unknown	The schooners ran aground in Liverpool Bay.

== 21 October ==
List of shipwrecks: 21 October 1877
Ship	State	Description
Emsworth	United Kingdom	The brig was run into by the steamship Ettrick (United Kingdom) and sank in the River Thames at Wapping, Middlesex. Her three crew were rescued by Ettrick.
Mars	Norway	The brig ran aground on the Plough Rocks, off the coast of Northumberland, United Kingdom. She was on a voyage from "Skonvig" to Grangemouth, Stirlingshire, United Kingdom. She was refloated and taken in to Berwick upon Tweed, Northumberland in a waterlogged condition.

== 22 October ==
List of shipwrecks: 22 October 1877
Ship	State	Description
Columbia	Norway	The brig ran aground at "Holmetunge", Denmark and was severely damaged. She was on a voyage from Örnsköldsvik, Sweden to Honfleur, Manche, France. She was refloated and taken in to Copenhagen, Denmark.
Joseph and Mary	United Kingdom	The schooner ran aground on the Shipwash Sand, in the North Sea off the coast of Suffolk. She was on a voyage from London to Boston, Lincolnshire. She was refloated and taken in to Lowestoft, Suffolk in a leaky condition.
Sarah	United Kingdom	The ship was beached at New Ferry, Cheshire. She was on a voyage from Quebec City, Canada to Liverpool, Lancashire.
Serina	United Kingdom	The schooner collided with the barque Famiglie (Flag unknown) and sank in the Clyde at Glasgow, Renfrewshire.
Washbevin	Denmark	The ship was driven ashore on Amager. She was on a voyage from Riga, Russia to Aarhus. She was refloated with assistance.
Unnamed	United Kingdom	The brig was driven ashore at Dungarvan, County Waterford.

== 23 October ==
List of shipwrecks: 23 October 1877
Ship	State	Description
Acorn	United Kingdom	The schooner was driven ashore and wrecked at Workington, Cumberland. Her five crew were rescued. She was on a voyage from Drogheda, County Louth to Workington.
Boston	Flag unknown	The ship ran aground at Östergarn, Sweden. She was refloated and taken in to Copenhagen, Denmark, where she arrived on 25 October.
Scottish Minstrel	United Kingdom	The steamship ran aground in the River Tees. She was on a voyage from Middlesbrough, Yorkshire to India. She was refloated the next day and resumed her voyage.

== 24 October ==
List of shipwrecks: 24 October 1877
Ship	State	Description
Clan Alpine	New Zealand	The 40-ton schooner foundered when hit by a violent storm off the Kaikōura Peninsula. Wreckage was discovered several days later, but no sign was found of her crew of four.

== 25 October ==
List of shipwrecks: 25 October 1877
Ship	State	Description
A. J. Pettingill	United States	The ship was driven ashore at Philadelphia, Pennsylvania. She was on a voyage from Gävle, Sweden to Philadelphia. She was refloated.
Gipsey	United States	The ship ran aground at New York. She was on a voyage from New York to Santa Cruz. She was refloated and resumed her voyage.
Granger	United Kingdom	The East Indiaman was wrecked on a reef off Borneo, Netherlands East Indies. Her crew took to three boats; one boat reached Singapore, Straits Settlements. She was on a voyage from Liverpool, Lancashire to Manila, Spanish East Indies.
James Horn	United Kingdom	The ship was driven ashore at Sunderland, County Durham and caught fire due to her cargo of lime getting wet. Her crew were rescued by rocket apparatus. She was on a voyage from Sunderland to Aberdeen.
Julia	United Kingdom	The ship ran aground on the Laggan Rock. Her crew were rescued. She was on a voyage from Glasgow, Renfrewshire to Surinam.
Mabel	United Kingdom	The ship was driven ashore on the coast of the Natal Colony with the loss of two of her crew. She was declared a total loss.

== 26 October ==
List of shipwrecks: 26 October 1877
Ship	State	Description
California	United Kingdom	The brig ran aground on the Scroby Sands, Norfolk. She was on a voyage from Riga, Russia to Great Yarmouth, Norfolk. She was refloated with the assistance of a tug and taken in to Great Yarmouth.
Eskett	United Kingdom	The ship departed from Whitehaven, Cumberland for Newport, Monmouthshire. No further trace, reported missing.
Hecla	United Kingdom	The ship departed from the River Tyne for Trieste. No further trace, reported missing.
Jeanne and Joseph	United Kingdom	The ship departed from Neath, Glamorgan for Drogheda, County Louth. No further trace, presumed foundered with the loss of all hands.
Julia	United Kingdom	The schooner was wrecked on the Beacon Rock, off the coast of Wigtownshire. She was on a voyage from Glasgow, Renfrewshire to Surinam.
Zeolite	United Kingdom	The schooner was abandoned in the Atlantic Ocean (49°01′N 37°52′W). Her crew were rescued by Devonia (United Kingdom). Zeolite was on a voyage from Labrador, Newfoundland Colony to Naples, Italy.

== 27 October ==
List of shipwrecks: 27 October 1877
Ship	State	Description
Ellen Browse	United Kingdom	The barque was driven ashore at East London, Cape Colony. Her crew were rescued. She was a total loss.
John Shelly	United Kingdom	The schooner was driven ashore at Harrington, Cumberland. She was on a voyage from Belfast, County Antrim to Harrington. She was refloated.
Trafalgar	United Kingdom	The Thames barge collided with the full-rigged ship Lord of the Isles (United Kingdom) and sank in the River Thames at Blackwall, Middlesex. Her crew survived.
Trial	United Kingdom	The schooner was driven ashore at Harrington. She was on a voyage from Dundalk, County Louth to Harrington.

== 28 October ==
List of shipwrecks: 28 October 1877
Ship	State	Description
Alert	United Kingdom	The brig was driven ashore at Gallipoli, Ottoman Empire. She was on a voyage from Cardiff, Glamorgan to Constantinople, Ottoman Empire.
Elizabeth	Netherlands	The galliot collided with the steamship Thomas Wilson (United Kingdom) off Hogland, Russia and was severely damaged. She was towed in to Kronstadt in a sinking condition by Thomas Wilson.
Epaminodas	United Kingdom	The ship was wrecked in the Atlantic Ocean. Her crew were rescued by M. and E. Cox ( Canada).
Marsala	United Kingdom	The ship sprang a leak and foundered in the North Sea 6 nautical miles (11 km) east of Kinnaird Head, Aberdeenshire. Her six crew survived. She was on a voyage from Newcastle upon Tyne, Northumberland to Galway.
Velasquez	Spain	The steamship ran aground in the Guadalquivir. She was refloated and taken in to Seville.
Waterloo	United Kingdom	The ship was sighted off Bic, Quebec, Canada whilst on a voyage from Quebec City, Canada to Liverpool, Lancashire. No further trace, reported missing.

== 29 October ==
List of shipwrecks: 29 October 1877
Ship	State	Description
Chieftain	United Kingdom	The tug was driven ashore at Swansea, Glamorgan. She was refloated and beached.
Faraday	United Kingdom	The steamship collided with th steamship Wear (United Kingdom) and was beached at Northfleet, Kent.
Fritz	Germany	The brig was driven ashore on "Sando".
H. P. Stephenson	United Kingdom	The steamship ran aground in the Elbe. She was on a voyage from Newcastle upon Tyne, Northumberland to Hamburg, Germany.
Iron Age	United States	The ship was destroyed by fire at Surabaya, Netherlands East Indies.
Leontine	United Kingdom	The ship ran aground in the River Avon. She was on a voyage from Quebec City, Canada to Bristol, Gloucestershire.
Nellie	United Kingdom	The steamship ran aground on the Travegrund and was severely damaged. She was on a voyage from Kiel, Germany to Leith, Lothian. She was refloated on 9 November and taken in to Copenhagen, Denmark for repairs.
Nimrod	Russia	The barque ran aground at Kristiansand, Norway. She was on a voyage from Vintava, Courland Governorate to Antwerp.
Pekin	United States	The ship departed from New York for Cardiff, Glamorgan, United Kingdom. No further trace, reported missing.

== 30 October ==
List of shipwrecks: 30 October 1877
Ship	State	Description
Charles Chaloner	United Kingdom	The schooner was driven ashore at Fleetwood, Lancashire. She was on a voyage from Quebec City, Canada to Fleetwood. She was later refloated and taken in to Fleetwood.
Line	Denmark	The crewless brigantine was driven ashore and sank at Agger. She was on a voyage from Antwerp, Belgium to Riga, Russia.
Louise	Norway	The barque ran aground on Amager, Denmark. She was on a voyage from Nyland, Sweden to Marseille, Bouches-du-Rhône, France.
Miras	United Kingdom	The ship was driven ashore on the coast of Somerset and sank. Her crew survived.
Rapid	United Kingdom	The ship was driven ashore on Læsø, Denmark. She was on a voyage from Granton, Lothian to Riga, Russia She was refloated but consequently sank.

== 31 October ==
List of shipwrecks: 31 October 1877
Ship	State	Description
Auguste	Germany	The schooner was driven ashore at Dagerort, Russia.
Colbert	France	The barque was abandoned in the English Channel off the Isle of Wight, United Kingdom. Her fifteen crew were rescued by the steamship Spartan (United Kingdom). Colbert was on a voyage from Havre de Grâce, Seine-Inférieure to Buenos Aires, Argentina. She was towed in to Havre de Grâce.
Devonia	United Kingdom	The steamship ran aground in the Clyde at Garvel Point. She was on a voyage from New York, United States to Greenock, Renfrewshire.
D. W. Chapman	United States	The full-rigged ship was wrecked on the Haaks Bank, in the North Sea off the Dutch coast. Her crew were rescued. She was on a voyage from New York to Bremen, Germany.
Hango	(Russian Empire) Grand Duchy of Finland	The steamship ran aground near Loviisa.
Humility	United Kingdom	The schooner ran aground on the Cockle Sand, in the North Sea off the coast of Norfolk. She was on a voyage from South Shields, County Durham to Margate, Kent. She was refloated with the assistance of a tug and assisted in to Great Yarmouth, Norfolk in a severely leaky condition.
Lynet	Norway	The barque was driven ashore and wrecked at Balnakiel, Caithness, United Kingdom. Her crew were rescued. She was on a voyage from Wilmington, Delaware to Hull, Yorkshire, United Kingdom.
Maindee Park	United Kingdom	The steamship ran aground on Amager, Denmark. She was on a voyage from Königsberg, Germany to Dublin. She was refloated on 2 November and taken in to Copenhagen, Denmark.
Oden	Norway	The brig was driven ashore at "Ragenlanset". She was refloated and towed in to Ursviken, Sweden.
Stella Gazzolo	Italy	The ship ran aground at Fray Bentos, Uruguay. She was on a voyage from Cardiff, Glamorgan, United Kingdom to Fray Bentos. She was refloated and found to be leaky.
Tiger	United Kingdom	The steamship ran aground on the Middle Sand, in the Humber. She was on a voyage from Hull, Yorkshire to Hamburg, Germany.
Water Lily	United Kingdom	The schooner was sighted in the Øresund whilst on a voyage from Saint Petersburg, Russia to Newry, County Antrim. No further trace, reported missing.

== Unknown date ==
List of shipwrecks: Unknown date in October 1877
Ship	State	Description
Active	United Kingdom	The ship was driven ashore on Goeree, Zeeland, Netherlands.
Agnes Sutherland	United Kingdom	The full-rigged ship was driven ashore on Antigua before 13 October.
Aigle	France	The schooner ran aground off Hanko, Grand Duchy of Finland. She was refloated.
Alice Otto	United Kingdom	The ship steamship ran aground. She was on a voyage from Liverpool, Lancashire to New Orleans, Louisiana, United States. She was refloated and put in to Key West, Florida, United States.
Amicus	United Kingdom	The ship collided with the steamship Gamma (United Kingdom) and was beached at Quebec City, Canada. Amicus was on a voyage from Montreal, Quebec, Canada to Cork.
Anna	United Kingdom	The ship was driven ashore at Saint Thomas, Virgin Islands. She was later refloated.
Anna	United Kingdom	The ship was driven ashore and wrecked at Nikolaistad (Vaasa), Grand Duchy of Finland. Her crew were rescued. She was on a voyage from Hudiksvall, Sweden to Hull, Yorkshire.
Anna Fogt	Germany	The ship was driven ashore and wrecked near Egersund, Norway. She was on a voyage from Antwerp, Belgium to Trondheim.
Annie and John	United Kingdom	The ship was abandoned in the Atlantic Ocean.
Ask	Norway	The brig was wrecked at Nikolainkaupunki.
Atalus	Norway	The brig was wrecked near Kristiansand with the loss of all but one of her crew.
Atlanta	United Kingdom	The ship was driven ashore at Singleton Park, Glamorgan. She was refloated and towed in to Port Talbot, Glamorgan.
Blanche	New South Wales	The ship was wrecked on Mallicolo, New Hebrides. Her crew were rescued.
Carl August	United Kingdom	The barque put in to Stavanger, Norway in a waterlogged condition. She was on a voyage from Grimsby, Lincolnshire to London.
Caroline	Spain	The ship was wrecked on Point Cadena. She was on a voyage from Santander to Mayaquez, Puerto Rico.
City of Waterford	United Kingdom	The ship was wrecked at Arkhangelsk before 3 October.
Catterina Maggio	Italy	The ship was abandoned in the Atlantic Ocean before 19 October. She was on a voyage from Buenos Aires, Argentina to Marseille, Bouches-du-Rhône, France.
Clara	Germany	The ship was driven ashore and wrecked on Bermuda. She was on a voyage from Puerto Plata, Dominican Republic to Hamburg.
Commerce	United Kingdom	The brig ran aground and was driven ashore at Hartlepool, County Durham. she was on a voyage from Brevik, Norway to Middlesbrough, Yorkshire. She was refloated and taken in to Hartlepool.
Cora Linn	United Kingdom	The ship was abandoned in the Atlantic Ocean. Her crew were rescued by Northumbria (United Kingdom). Cora Linn was on a voyage from Quebec City to Greenock, Renfrewshire.
Decori	(Canada)	The schooner foundered in the Atlantic Ocean off the coast of New York.
East	United Kingdom	The barque pun in to Stavanger in a waterlogged condition. She was on a voyage from Quebec City to Leith, Lothian.
Edmond	France	The barque was driven ashore. She was refloated on 25 October and taken in to Kastrup, Denmark.
Georgia	United States	The barque foundered in the Atlantic Ocean. Her crew were rescued. She was on a voyage from Boston, Massachusetts to Liverpool.
Fanny Wright	South Australia	The ship was wrecked in Wallaroo Bay. Her crew were rescued.
Flora	Russia	The barque ran aground at Gävle, Sweden. She was on a voyage from Gävle to Hull.
George Gilchrist	United States	The ship was lost whilst on a voyage from Pensacola, Florida to Greytown, Nicaragua.
George Kremelburg	United States	The ship capsized and sank in the Atlantic Ocean before 10 October. Her crew were rescued by the brigantine Aurora Australis (Spain). George Kremelburg was on a voyage from New York to Queenstown, County Cork, United Kingdom.
Glaramara	United Kingdom	The ship ran aground at Port Augusta, South Australia.
Glenhaven	United Kingdom	The ship was driven ashore in the Saint Lawrence River downstream of Quebec City. She was on a voyage from Quebec City to Cardiff, Glamorgan. She was later refloated and put back to Quebec City.
Hannah Morris	United Kingdom	The ship ran aground in the Miramichi River. She was on a voyage from Miramichi, New Brunswick, Canada to Bristol, Gloucestershire.
Harewood	United Kingdom	The ship was abandoned in the Atlantic Ocean before 29 October.
Headquarters	United Kingdom	The steamship ran aground on the Middelgrunden, in the Baltic Sea.
Helene	United Kingdom	The ship was driven ashore at Saint-Esprit, Quebec. She was consequently condemned.
Herald	United States	The barque ran aground in the Milk River. She was on a voyage from Montego Bay to the Milk River.
Ida	Italy	The schooner ran aground on the English Bank, in the River Plate. She was on a voyage from Cardiff to Fray Bentos, Uruguay. She was refloated and put in to Montevideo, Uruguay in a leaky condition.
Irrawaddy	United Kingdom	The ship ran aground in the Suez Canal. She was refloated.
Jewess	United Kingdom	The schooner sprang a leak and was beached at Ryde, Isle of Wight. She was on a voyage from Havre de Grâce, Seine-Inférieure, France to Cardiff.
John Watts	United Kingdom	The Thames barge was towed in to Sheerness, Kent in a sinking condition. She was on a voyage from Dover, Kent to Colchester, Essex.
Lady Aline	United Kingdom	The steamship ran aground at Horsens, Denmark. She was refloated and taken in to the Nieuwe Diep, where she arrived on 9 October.
Mabel	United Kingdom	The brigantine ran aground at Shediac, New Brunswick. She was on a voyage from Buctouche, New Brunswick to Liverpool. She was refloated and towed in to Pictou, Nova Scotia, Canada, where she arrived on 28 October.
Maggie	United Kingdom	The schooner was abandoned at sea before 18 October. Her crew were rescued by the barque Astrea (Russia). Maggie was on a voyage from Portsmouth, Hampshire to Prince Edward Island, Canada.
Maggie	United Kingdom	The ship was abandoned at sea before 18 October. Her crew were rescued. She was on a voyage from Huelva, Spain to Port Talbot, Glamorgan.
Magnolia	United States	The ship foundered before 3 October. All on board were rescued. She was on a voyage from Savannah, Georgia to New York.
Marion	United Kingdom	The ship was driven ashore in the Traverse. She was on a voyage from Quebec City to London. She was refloated.
Merse	United Kingdom	The barque was wrecked on the Pratas Island before 14 October. She was on a voyage from Hong Kong to Niuzhuang, China.
Moero	United Kingdom	The schooner was abandoned at sea. Her crew were rescyed by the steamship Ayrshire (United Kingdom). Moero was on a voyage from Yarmouth, Nova Scotia to Martinique. She was towed in to Barbados.
Nicholas Wredeman	Germany	The ship was wrecked at Beaufort, South Carolina, United States. She was on a voyage from Hamburg to Charleston, South Carolina. She subsequently became a wreck.
O. D. W.	Spain	The barque was wrecked in the Cayman Islands. Her crew were rescued. She was on a voyage from Rio de Janeiro, Brazil to New Orleans.
Olaf	Denmark	The steamship was driven ashore at Lyserort, Courland Governorate. She was on a voyage from Riga, Russia to Dunkirk, Nord, France. She was refloated and resumed her voyage, but put in to Copenhagen on 10 October.
Ostersaen	United Kingdom	The ship struck rocks at Fife Ness, Fife, United Kingdom. She was on a voyage from Christiania to LeithLeith She was refloated and completed her voyage in a severely leaky condition.
Palma	Norway	The schooner ran aground at Helsingborg, Sweden. She was on a voyage from Málaga, Spain to Copenhagen, Denmark and Reval, Russia. She was refloated with assistance and taken in to Copenhagen, where she arrived on 25 October.
Parana	France	The steamship was driven ashore and wrecked at Abrantes, Brazil. Her passengers were rescued. She was on a voyage from Bordeaux, Gironde to Buenos Aires, Argentina.
Pauline	France	The ship was driven ashore near "Rickham Coastguard Station" with the loss of at least two lives.
Plimsoll	Sweden	The brig was driven ashore and severely damaged at Peel, Isle of Man.
Pride of the Dart	United Kingdom	The ship ran aground on the Eagle Sand, in the North Sea off the coast of Essex. She was on a voyage from Ipswich, Suffolk to Plymouth, Devon. She was refloated and taken in to the River Colne in a leaky condition.
Proteus	United Kingdom	The ship was driven ashore in the Traverse. She was on a voyage from Quebec City to Hull, Yorkshire. She was refloated and put back to Quebec City.
Ragnald Jarl	Norway	The ship was abandoned at sea. She was towed in to Guernsey, Channel Islands in a waterlogged condition.
Rowland	United Kingdom	The steamship was wrecked at Holyrood, Newfoundland Colony. She was on a voyage from Montreal to Queenstown.
Royal Frederick	United Kingdom	The ship was driven ashore near Rye, Sussex, United Kingdom.
Saldanho	Portugal	The brig was driven ashore on Scharhörn, Germany and capsized. Her crew were rescued. She was on a voyage from Hamburg to Laga.
Sarah	United Kingdom	The brigantine was driven ashore in the Gut of Canso.
Silentium	Sweden	The barque was driven ashore. She was on a voyage from Hull to Pori, Grand Duchy of Finland. She was refloated and put in to Copenhagen, Denmark in a leaky condition.
Stad Middelburg	Netherlands	The ship ran aground on "Cross Dapae Nuit". She was on a voyage from Surabaya, Netherlands East Indies to a Dutch port.
Sunshine	Norway	The ship was driven ashore at Stenåsa, Sweden. She was on a voyage from Sandarne, Sweden to London.
Surprise	United States	The barque was driven ashore at the "Salvo Lighthouse". She was on a voyage from Venice, Italy to Trieste.
Thames	United Kingdom	The barque sank in the River Thames at the Custom House.
Tjalf	Denmark	The ship departed from Egedesminde, Greenland for a Danish port. No further trace, presumed foundered with the loss of all hands.
United	United Kingdom	The ship struck rocks at Légué and sank. She was on a voyage from Falmouth, Cornwall to Tréguier, Côtes-du-Nord.
Valency	United Kingdom	The dandy ran aground and was wrecked at Newport, Monmouthshire.
Vanguard	United Kingdom	The ship was driven ashore at Matane, Quebec.
Ville de Nantes	France	The steamship was wrecked on Hoedic, Morbihanon or before 5 October. At least eight crew survived. She was on a voyage from Nantes, Loire-Inférieure to Glasgow, Renfrewshire, United Kingdom.
Vision	Norway	The ship capsized and was abandoned in the Atlantic Ocean before 30 October. Her crew were rescued by Oscar (Sweden).
Waterlily	United Kingdom	The schooner departed from Helsingør, Denmark for Kronstadt, Russia. No further trace, presumed foundered with the loss of all hands.
17th Mai	Norway	The ship ran aground and sank at Stavanger. Her crew were rescued. She was on a voyage from Middlesbrough to Stavanger.
