= Patrick Forbes (bishop of Aberdeen) =

Scottish churchman

- Bishop of Aberdeen
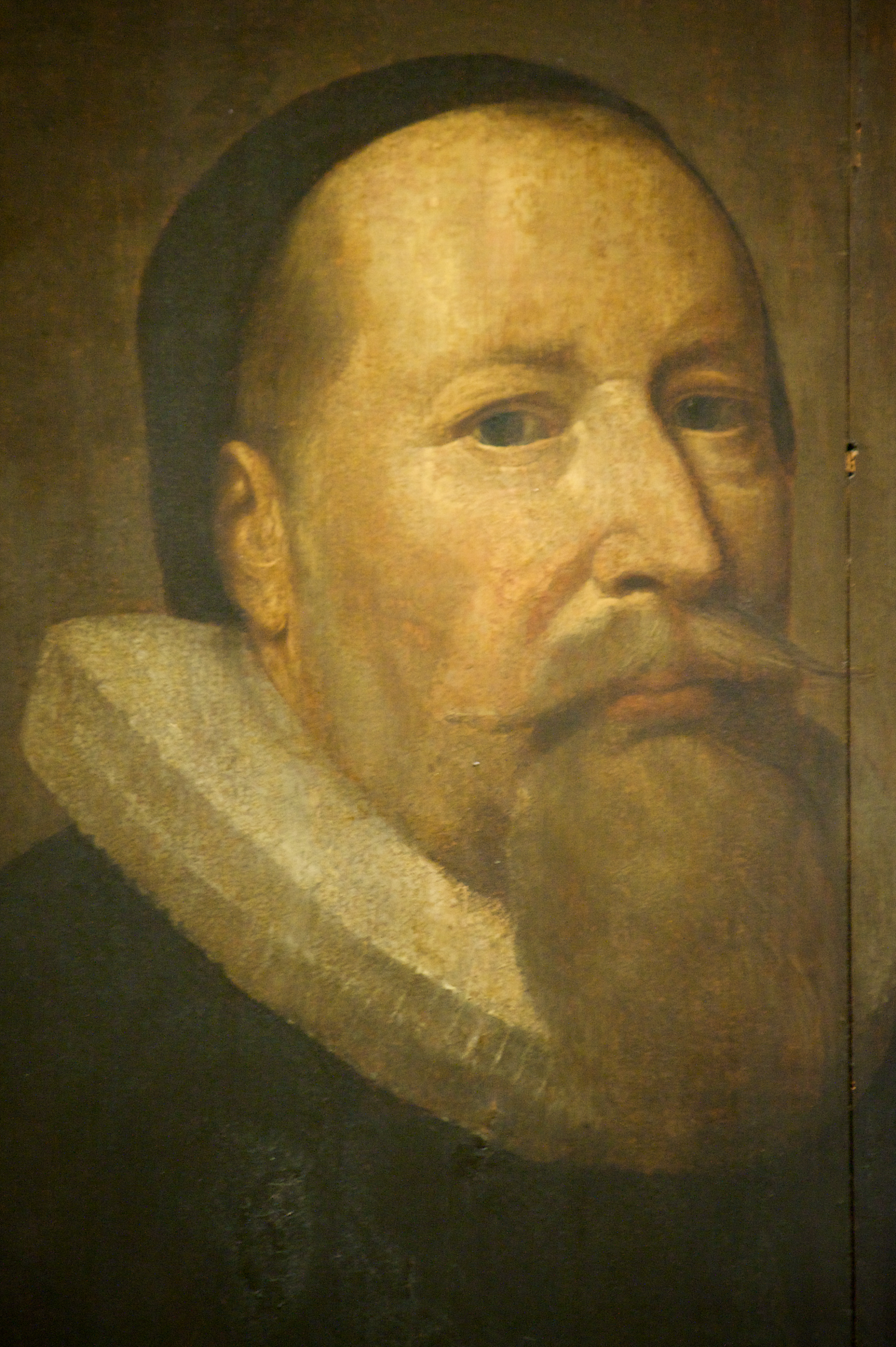
- Church: Church of Scotland
- See: Diocese of Aberdeen
- In office: 1618–1635
- Predecessor: Alexander Forbes
- Successor: Adam Bellenden

Orders
- Consecration: 17 May 1618

Personal details
- Born: 24 August 1564; Corse Castle, near Lumphanan, Aberdeenshire
- Died: 28 March 1635 (aged 70); Aberdeen

Patrick Forbes (24 August 1564 – 28 March 1635) was a late 16th-century and early 17th-century Scottish churchman rising to the post of Protestant Bishop of Aberdeen.

== Life ==
Born in 1564, he was the oldest son of Elizabeth Strachan and her husband William Forbes, laird of Corse. He attended the High School of Stirling, the University of Glasgow and then the University of St Andrews. At St Andrews, he came under the influence of the renowned theologian Andrew Melville. In 1598, Forbes's father died, leaving him his estate.

Forbes became religiously puritanical and an avid preacher, though he was reluctant to enter the ministry. George Gledstanes, Archbishop of St Andrews, ordered him to enter the ministry or stop preaching, and as a result Forbes confined his preaching to his own household. At the death of his friend John Chalmers, the minister of Keith, in 1611, the dying Chalmers requested Forbes to take control of the parish of Keith and continue his work there. So it was that in 1612, aged forty-eight, Forbes received his ordination into the ministry and became minister of Keith, in the diocese of Moray.

During this period, Forbes authored several theological writings, among them "An Exquisite Commentarie upon the Revelation of Saint John" (1613) and "Short Discovery of the Adversarie" (1614). In the former, he was vehemently anti-Catholicism and argued that the Catholic Church had become corrupted by the greed of bishops even before the reign of the Emperor Constantine the Great, becoming irrecoverable during the papacy of Pope Boniface VIII. In the latter work, he moderated his views on episcopacy, but still declared bishoprics to be unnecessary institutions.

In January 1618, Forbes was given the crown nomination to succeed Alexander Forbes as Bishop of Aberdeen, after receiving an unsuccessful nomination two years previously. He was elected on 24 March, obtained royal provision on 8 April and received consecration of 17 May. Forbes was apparently initially reluctant to take up the position, but cited his obedience to the king's wishes. Taking up a bishopric necessarily meant that he encountered some hostility from the anti-episcopal presbyterians in the Church of Scotland, but Forbes was nevertheless well respected for his piety and theology.

His summer residence was Tullynessle Tower in Tullynessle, Aberdeenshire.

As Chancellor of the University of Aberdeen, Forbes was responsible for much reorganisation in the university, including reconstruction of the system for education and training future ministers. Forbes began to suffer from apoplexy and died on 28 March 1635. He was buried in St Machar's Cathedral in Old Aberdeen. The funeral service was conducted by Prof David Leitch.

== Family ==
He married Lucretia Spens, daughter of David Spens of Wormiston and sister of James Spens, and by her fathered five children, one of whom was the noted theologian John Forbes.

== Notes ==
Religious titles
Preceded by Alexander Forbes	Bishop of Aberdeen; 1618–1635	Succeeded by Adam Bellenden
