= Aindréas of Caithness =

Andreas or Aindréas of Caithness († 1184) was the first known bishop of Caithness and a source for the author of de Situ Albanie. Aindréas was a native Scot, and very likely came from a prominent family in Gowrie, or somewhere in this part of Scotland. He was a prominent landowner in Gowrie, Angus and Fife, and it is likely that he was a brother of one Eòghan "of Monorgan", another Gowrie landlord. At some stage in his career, he was a monk of Dunfermline Abbey (see below), though it is not known if this was before or during his period as bishop of Caithness.

The date of his accession to the bishopric is unknown, but he was certainly bishop by the year 1146 AD. The latter date is the latest date for Aindréas' first charter appearance (as bishop) in the notitiae written on the margins of the Book of Deer. It is not known for certain that Aindréas ever visited Caithness, but his successor John certainly did. If Aindréas did, he would have been based at Halkirk. It is probably no coincidence that the erection of the Scottish diocese of Caithness, and imposition of a Gaelic bishop, coincided with the introduction of Harald (Aralt), son of the Earl or Mormaer of Atholl Matad, as ruler of the formerly Norse-ruled province.

Bishop Aindréas is a frequent witness to the charters of Kings David I, Maol Caluim IV and William I. The author of the early 13th century historical tract known as de Situ Albanie (En: On the Place of Scotland) cites Aindréas as a source for his second list of Pictish kingdoms, and describes him as "a trustworthy informant ... a venerable man, bishop of Caithness, by nation a Gael (nacione Scoctus) and monk of Dunfermline". He died at Dunfermline on 29 December 1184.

== Notes ==
Religious titles
Preceded by -	Bishop of Caithness; 1146–1184	Succeeded by John
