= David Mitchel =

Scottish clergyman

Bishop David Mitchel, Mitchell or Mitchelson (c.1591–1663) was a Scottish clergyman.

== Life ==
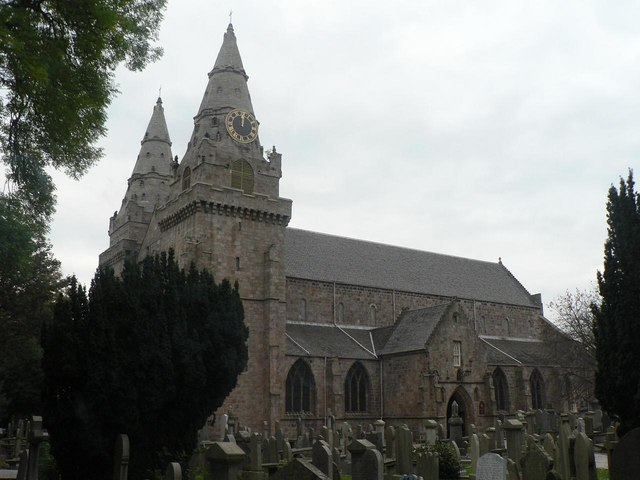
Aberdeen Cathedral (St Machar's)

Born in the Mearns, he was the son of a farmer in Garvock parish. He gained an MA degree from St Andrews University and became minister in his home parish of Garvock (east of Laurencekirk) before translating to "second charge" of the Old Kirk, St Giles in Edinburgh in 1628, moving to "first charge" in 1634. At that time St Giles was split into four parishes, each served by a first charge and second charge minister – eight in total, all under a single Dean.

He held the position until he was deposed by the General Assembly for teaching Arminianism in 1638, after which he moved to England. While there he obtained a benefice, and in 1661, after the Restoration, he obtained a doctorate from the University of Oxford. In this period he became a prebendary of Westminster.

Upon the restoration of Episcopacy in Scotland, he was made Bishop of Aberdeen, receiving consecration at St Andrews Cathedral on 1 June 1662. He held this position for little over half a year, contracting a mortal fever. He died at Aberdeen on 29 June 1663, and was buried in the St Machar's Cathedral.

Church of Scotland titles
Preceded by Adam Bellenden	Bishop of Aberdeen; 1662–1663	Succeeded by Alexander Burnet
