= Adam Bellenden =

Scottish churchman

Bishop Adam Bellenden (died 1647) was a 17th-century Scottish churchman serving the Church of Scotland and rising to be Bishop of Aberdeen.

== Life ==
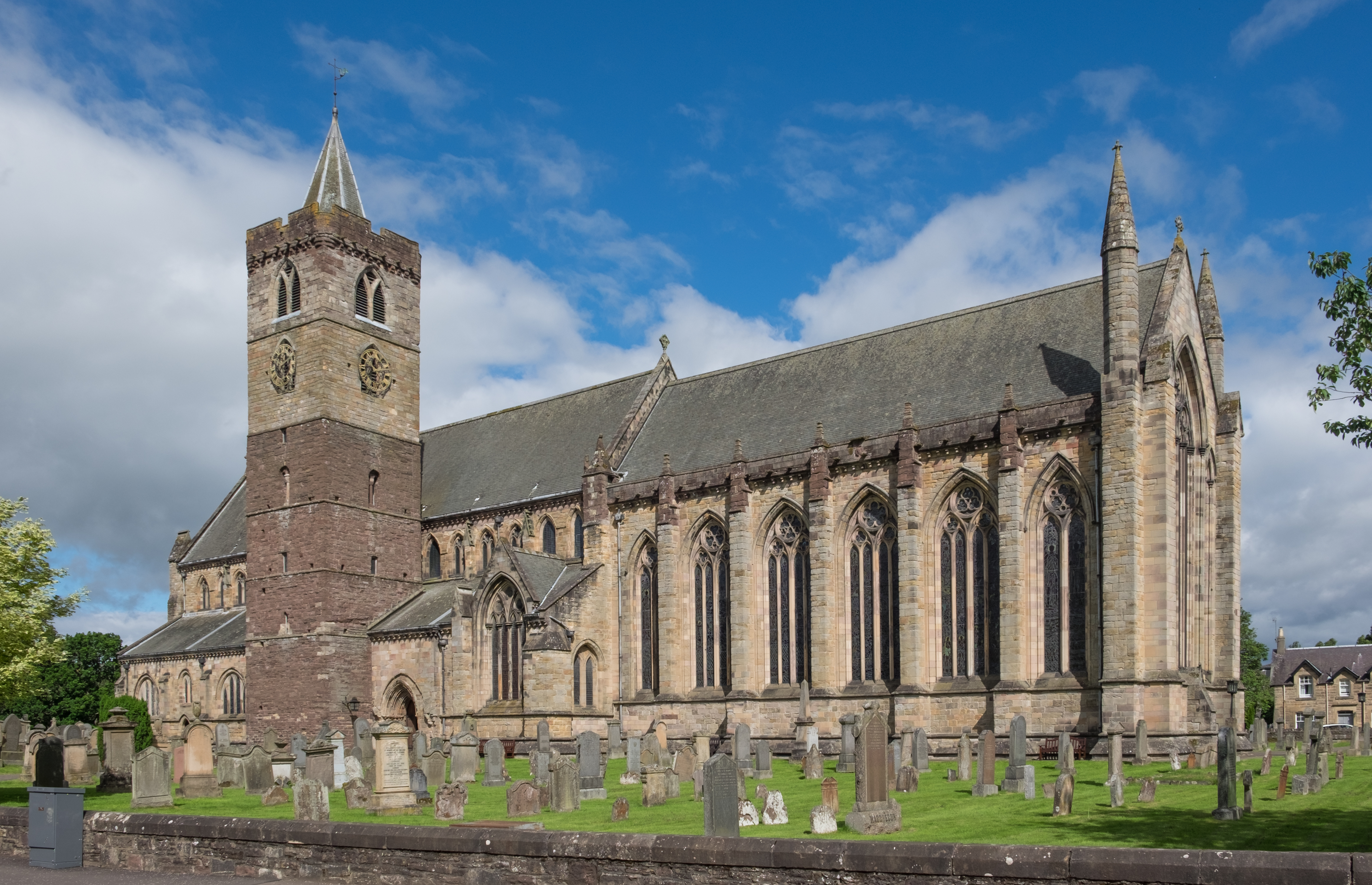
Dunblane Cathedral

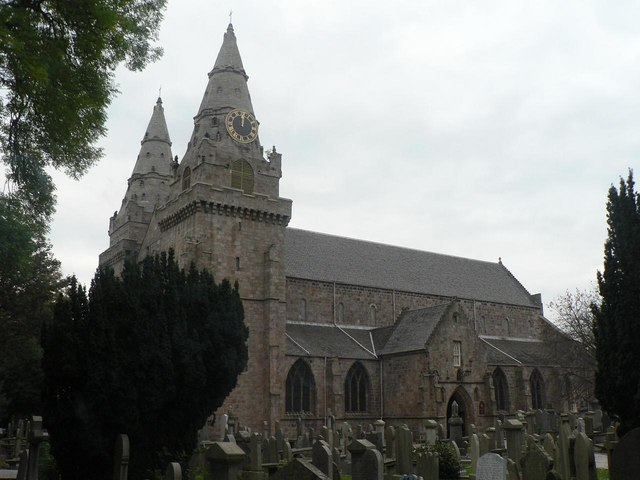
Aberdeen Cathedral (St Machar's)

Bellenden was the son of Sir John Bellenden of Auchnoul, Lord Justice Clerk, and Barbara Kennedy, daughter of Sir Hugh Kennedy of Girvanmains by his spouse Janet Stewart, daughter to John Stewart, 2nd Earl of Atholl.

He graduated from the University of Edinburgh on 1 August 1590, and was ordained a Presbyterian minister on 19 July 1593. In 1608 he was appointed minister of Falkirk, a position he held until 1615.

He was promoted to the bishopric of Dunblane, receiving a Crown provision on 24 September 1615 and was consecrated by April of the following year. Balfour Paul states that he was also appointed, c. 1633, Dean of the Chapel Royal at Stirling Castle, and also held, as a personal right, Kilconquhar, succeeding to it upon the death of his nephew James, which was ratified in parliament in 1629. However, it is evident that Bellenden was appointed Dean of the Chapel Royal much earlier than Balfour Paul stated, as in 1621 the Privy Council of Scotland ordered that the widow of the previous Dean, William Couper, Bishop of Galloway, hand over documents relating to the Chapel Royal to Bellenden, and specifically called Bellenden 'deane of his Majesteis Chaippell'.

Bellenden was very active in secular affairs. He was appointed to Charles I's privy council in March 1626 and attended far more sessions than any other Scottish bishop.

After holding the Dunblane bishopric for several decades, on 2 August 1635, he was given the more prestigious bishopric of Aberdeen. On 13 December 1638, after the anti-Episcopacy Assembly in Glasgow, described by Spottiswoode as "the wild Assembly", he was deprived of this position and, with many others, excommunicated by the Scottish church. One contemporary recorded how his lodgings in Old Aberdeen were plundered by Covenanters in 1640 and that Bellenden 'escaping himselfe, he lived quietlie in ane husbandman's house' (possibly in Aboyne) before moving south to England. In 1642, he was appointed to the parish of Porlock in county Somerset (St Dubricius, Porlock, 1642 to 1647).

In the 1640s, Bellenden was described as 'ane aged man and of ane good lyfe'.

== Family ==
On 17 February 1595, Bellenden married Jean Abercrombie, daughter of Henry Abercrombie, of Kersie House near St. Ninians. Together they had 10 children, three daughters and seven sons, one of whom, David, was ordained and became minister of Kincardine O'Neil.

== Notes ==
- Dowden, John, The Bishops of Scotland, ed. J. Maitland Thomson, (Glasgow, 1912)
- Keith, Robert, editor, An Historical Catalogue of the Scottish Bishops: Down to the Year 1688, by John Spottiswoode, (London, 1924)
- Watt, D.E.R., Fasti Ecclesiae Scotinanae Medii Aevi ad annum 1638, 2nd Draft, (St Andrews, 1969)

Religious titles
Preceded by George Graham	Bishop of Dunblane; 1615–1635	Succeeded by James Wedderburn
Preceded by Patrick Forbes	Bishop of Aberdeen; 1635–1638	Vacant Title next held by David Mitchel
