= David Leitch (minister) =

Scottish philosopher

David Leitch (or Leith) (born 1608) was a Scottish philosopher who was commissioned to create various paraphrases and served as chaplain to the army during the English Civil War and as well as to King Charles II.

== Life ==
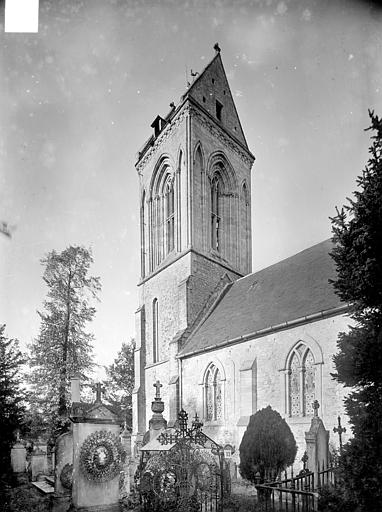
Ellon church

Leitch was born in 1607/8, the younger son of Rev Andrew Leitch of Maryton near Montrose on the Aberdeenshire coast. His brother was John Leitch the epigrammatist. He graduated MA from King's College, Aberdeen in 1624 and remained there for some years, first as a "Regent" (the equivalent of a Fellow) then as "Sub-Principal" (Deputy Principal) from 1632.

He is also said to have been a professor at King's College (this would be normal for the Sub-Principal) and in April 1635 was the official who presided over the funeral of Patrick Forbes, Bishop of Aberdeen.

In 1638 he was ordained as minister of Ellon, north of Aberdeen. At the instigation of the Covenant, he fled and sought protection of the King (Charles I), with whom he seems to have been personally acquainted, only returning to his ministry in June 1639. He gave a penitent sermon and swore allegiance to the Kirk in September 1640.

In 1644 he is recorded as seeing a vision just after midnight of the sun shining as if in the day. He called his beadle and neighbours who also witnessed the event.

In 1648 he was commissioned with John Adamson and Zachary Boyd to paraphrase the songs of the Old and New Testament but this task was not completed. Just prior to the English Civil War he went to England to serve as Chaplain to the Army. He was thereafter chaplain to King Charles in his capacity as King of Scotland.

He was arrested and imprisoned at Worcester Castle by Parliamentary forces but released in December 1649. He then returned to Scotland where he was appointed minister of Kemnay on 15 January 1650. He was replaced by Rev James Willox (formerly of Old Machar) in September 1654.

In 1653, he was awarded a Doctor of Divinity whilst he was living near London. He promised to return to his parish before 1 November but did not do so. On 16 May he was preaching in a church on the roadway to London. His fate is thereafter unknown. He corresponded with Drummond of Hawthornden and Sir Thomas Urquhart, who respected him as a poet, Latin scholar and theologian. He died sometime after 1657 (his last known published work).

== Family ==
Leitch married Elspet Gordon and had at least three children:

- David Leitch, burgess in Aberdeen (b.1655) and two daughters, Jean and Elizabeth.

== Publications ==
- Positiones Nonnulloe Philisophicoe (1633)
- Positiones Nonnulloe Logicoe et Philisophicoe (3 vols. 1634, 1635, 1636)
- Philosophia Illachrymans (1637)
- Theses Philosophicoe (1638)
- Parerga (Latin poems, (1657)
