= Wolfburn distillery =

Whisky distillery in Scotland, UK

Coordinates: 58°35′43″N 03°33′05″W

Region: Highland
- Location: Thurso, Caithness
- Owner: Aurora Brewing
- Founded: 1821 (closed c. 1865 – reopened 2013)
- Status: Operational
- Water source: Wolf Burn
- No. of stills: 1 wash 1 spirit
- Capacity: 125,000 litres
- Cask type(s): American Oak Bourbon; Oak Quarter Cask; Bourbon Hogsheads; Oloroso sherry

Wolfburn distillery is a Highland single malt Scotch whisky distillery in Thurso, Caithness, Scotland. After ceasing production in the 1860s, a new distillery of the same name opened in 2013.

== History ==
Wolfburn Distillery was founded just to the west of the town of Thurso, Caithness, in 1821 by William Smith. The distillery was of considerable size for its day and ran as a successful commercial enterprise for several decades, being handed down through several generations of the Smith family. It is thought to have ceased production during the 1860s, although the exact date is a matter of debate. The distillery appears on the first Ordnance Survey map of the area, dated 1872, marked as a ruin - but in the 1877 edition the words 'In ruin' have been removed, so it is possible that whisky production was still ongoing at this time. The reasons for its demise are unclear - very little remains of the original distillery and there are no known photographs. However, records of its annual production volumes of whisky can be found in tax returns, which show it producing 28,056 “Total Gallons of Proof Spirit” during 1826 (roughly 125,000 litres) – making it the biggest distillery in Caithness at the time.

=== Revival ===
In 2012 a private consortium gained approval from the Caithness planning authorities to build a new Wolfburn distillery in Henderson Park, Thurso. The new distillery is situated approximately 350 m from the site of the old one and draws its water from the Wolf Burn (stream), whence it gets its name. The reinvented Wolfburn site consists of four buildings: the distillery itself and three warehouses for the laying down of casks. Local fabricators Forsyths were contracted to install the distillery plant and equipment. Wolfburn is the most northerly whisky distillery on the Scottish mainland and produces single malt Scotch whisky. Production commenced in early 2013.

In February 2016 the new Wolfburn Distillery commenced bottling operations, in a purpose-built on-site bottling facility. The inaugural whisky was launched globally in March 2016 and has gone on to win several gold medal awards in international competitions. In 2023 Wolfburn released its first age-statement whisky, a 10 Year Old. In 2025 this was augmented by the launch of two 8 Year Olds and a new flagship 12 Year Old whisky.

In 2026 Jim Murray's Whisky Bible described Wolfburn's whisky as 'A masterpiece from the far north' and awarded Gold Medals to the entire core range, placing Wolfburn Cask Strength among the top 10 whiskies in the world.

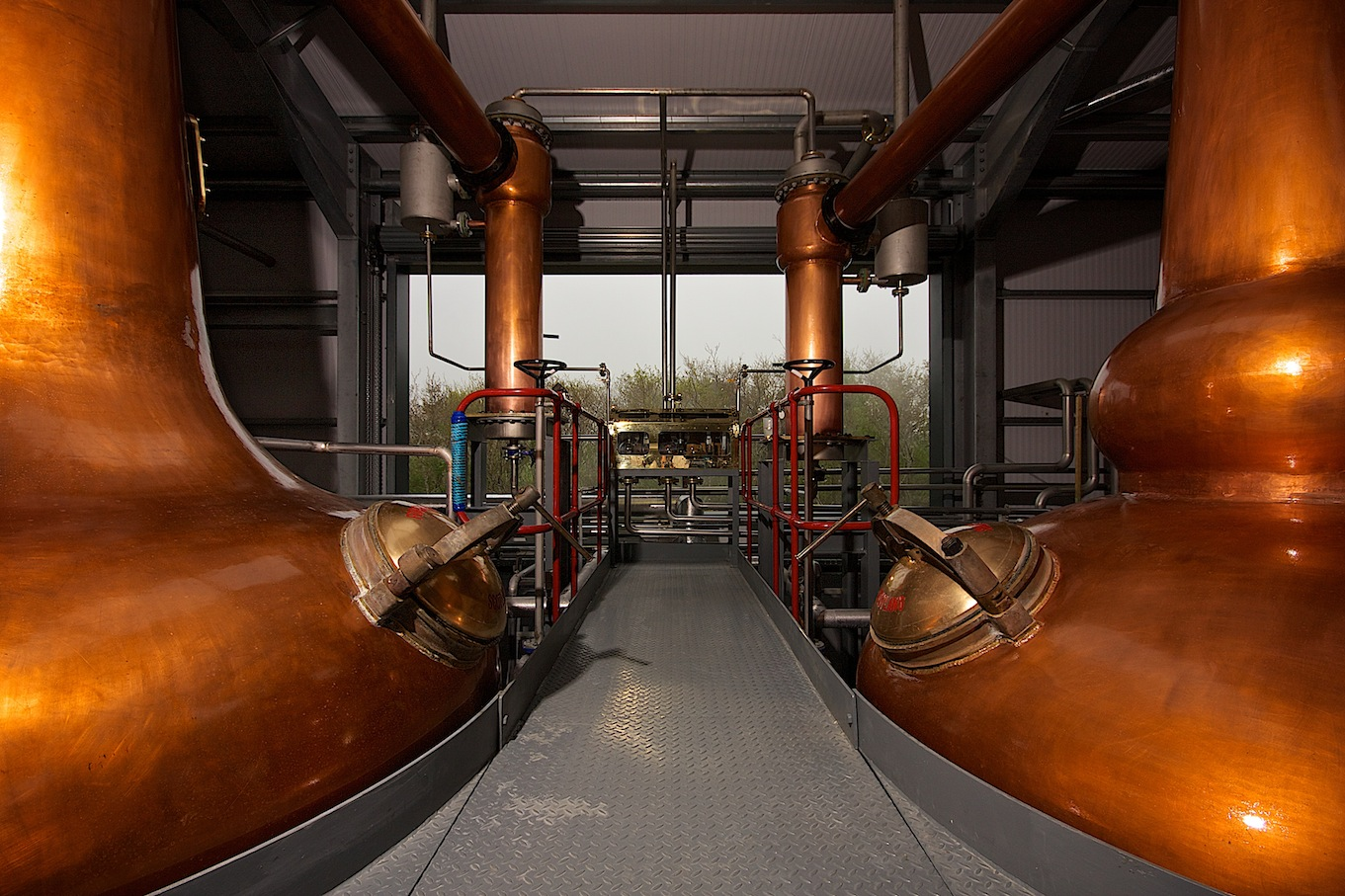
Wolfburn Distillery's wash still (on left) and spirit still (on right), with the spirit safe in the background

== See also ==
- List of whisky brands
- List of distilleries in Scotland
