= James Wedderburn (bishop) =

James Wedderburn (1585 – 23 September 1639), bishop of Dunblane, was the second son of John Wedderburn, a mariner and shipowner from Dundee, and Margaret Lindsay. James Wedderburn (1495?–1553), a poet and playwright and early Scottish proponent of Protestantism, was his grandfather.

He was born at Dundee in 1585, and began his university life at St. Andrews, matriculating in 1604, and graduating in 1608 with a Master of Arts; he moved thence to one of the English universities, probably the University of Cambridge. He was at one time tutor to the children of Isaac Casaubon, and among the Burney manuscripts in the British Museum there are several letters from him to Casaubon and to his son Meric, the latter having been Wedderburn's special pupil.

Wedderburn took orders in the Anglican Church, was minister at Harstone in 1615, and was closely associated with William Laud in the preparation of the liturgy for the Scottish church. He was professor of divinity in St Mary's College, St Andrews, in 1617, and had obtained his degree of D. D. before January 1623, as at that time, in conjunction with Principal Howie, he introduced the liturgy at the college, in compliance with the orders of the king.

In February 1626 he was appointed rector of Compton, diocese of Winchester, and was collated canon of Ely before Christmas 1626. Made D. D. by the University of Cambridge in 1627, he was presented by the king to the vicarage of Mildenhall, diocese of Norwich, on 12 September 1628. He was appointed prebendary of Whitchurch in the bishopric of Bath and Wells on 26 May 1631. He became dean of the Chapel Royal, Stirling, in October 1635.

On 11 February 1636 he was preferred to the see of Dunblane, in succession to Adam Bellenden, promoted to the bishopric of Aberdeen. He must have retained the prebend of Whitchurch, as no successor was appointed until 1 July 1638. When the Glasgow assembly of 13 December 1638 deposed the bishops, Wedderburn was expressly included in the excommunication, because "he had been a confidential agent of Laud, archbishop of Canterbury, in introducing the new liturgy and popish ceremonies". (See Bishops' Wars and National Covenant for context.)

He fled to England, in company with other Scottish bishops, and found protection from his patron, Archbishop Laud; but he did not long survive his deprivation. He died at Canterbury on 23 September 1639, and was buried in the chapel of the Virgin Mary in the cathedral there. There is a portrait of the bishop, by Jamieson, at Birkhill, Fife, reproduced in The Wedderburn Book. He was said to have written A Treatise of Reconciliation.

== Notes ==
Religious titles
Preceded by Adam Bellenden	Bishop of Dunblane; 1636–1638	Succeeded by Vacant next succeeded by Robert Leighton

== See also ==
- James, John and Robert Wedderburn
