= Walter de Baltrodin =

13th-century Scottish bishop

- Bishop of Caithness
- Church: Roman Catholic Church
- See: Diocese of Caithness
- In office: 1263–1270
- Predecessor: William
- Successor: Nicholas

Orders
- Consecration: 1263

Personal details
- Born: early or mid-1200s Pitroddie, Gowrie, Scotland
- Died: Dornoch (probably), 1270

Walter de Baltrodin (Baltroddi; Baltroddie; died 1270) was a 13th-century Scottish bishop.

== Origin and education ==
If his name can be taken as a guide, he came from "Baltrodin" – Baltroddie (Pitroddie) – in Gowrie. Although it is not known which university or universities he attended, he had achieved a Master's Degree by 1259 and was later a Doctor of Canon Law.

== Career ==
He held canonries in the dioceses of Aberdeen and Caithness when, in 1263, he was elected Bishop of Caithness. The decree of election was presented to Pope Urban IV by Roger de Castello, a canon of Aberdeen. The election was declared contrary to canon law, but the Pope took into account the poverty of the diocese of Caithness with the costs of the journey to Rome from such a distant diocese, and delegated the authority to judge the fitness of Walter to the Bishops of Dunkeld, Brechin and Ross.

As is usual with bishops of Caithness, very little is known about Walter's episcopate. It is known he received a subsidy from the king taken from the profits of justice in the province. According to Clan Mackay tradition, Aodh Mór MacAoidh (or Iye Mackay), married a daughter of Bishop Walter, acquiring 12 davochs of land at Durness.

== Death ==
Bishop Walter died sometime in the year 1270. His death was followed, after some delay, by the election of Nicholas, Abbot of Scone.

== Notes ==
Religious titles
Preceded by William	Bishop of Caithness; 1263–1270	Succeeded by Nicholas
