= Robert Hamilton (bishop) =

Scottish clergyman (c.1600–1649)

Robert Hamilton (c.1600–1649) was a prominent Scottish clergyman who served as Protestant Bishop of Caithness.

== Life ==
He was born around 1600, probably the son of Rev Robert Hamilton of Hamilton, Scotland. He studied at Glasgow University graduating MA in 1616.

He moved to Glassford, south of Hamilton, as assistant to Rev George Clydesdale and replaced him as minister in 1626 (probably due to ill-health as Clydesdale died in 1627). He was awarded a Doctor of Divinity around 1630.

He was made Procurator to the Church of Scotland and in the Glasgow Assembly of 1638 and this capacity presented the Bishops' "Declinator" of the Presbyterian jurisdiction. The same Assembly rebuked Hamilton on several charges: frequent absence from his parish; encouraging dancing; and encouraging male members of the congregation to play football after his sermon. For these indiscretions he was deposed from his position as Procurator on 14 December 1638. Ironically, roughly at the same time, in 1638, he replaced John Abernethy as Bishop of Caithness. He was never consecrated but in August 1639 was described as "Bishop Elect".

He retired to England where he died on 1 November 1649.

== Family ==
He married Isobel Murray (possibly Bishop Abernethy's widow), and had one daughter. He later married Helen Whiteford daughter of Adam Whiteford of Milton, widow of John Hamilton of Coltness.
