= Burnside, Highland =

Residential area of Thurso, Caithness, Scotland

Coordinates: 58.60063°N 3.54005°W

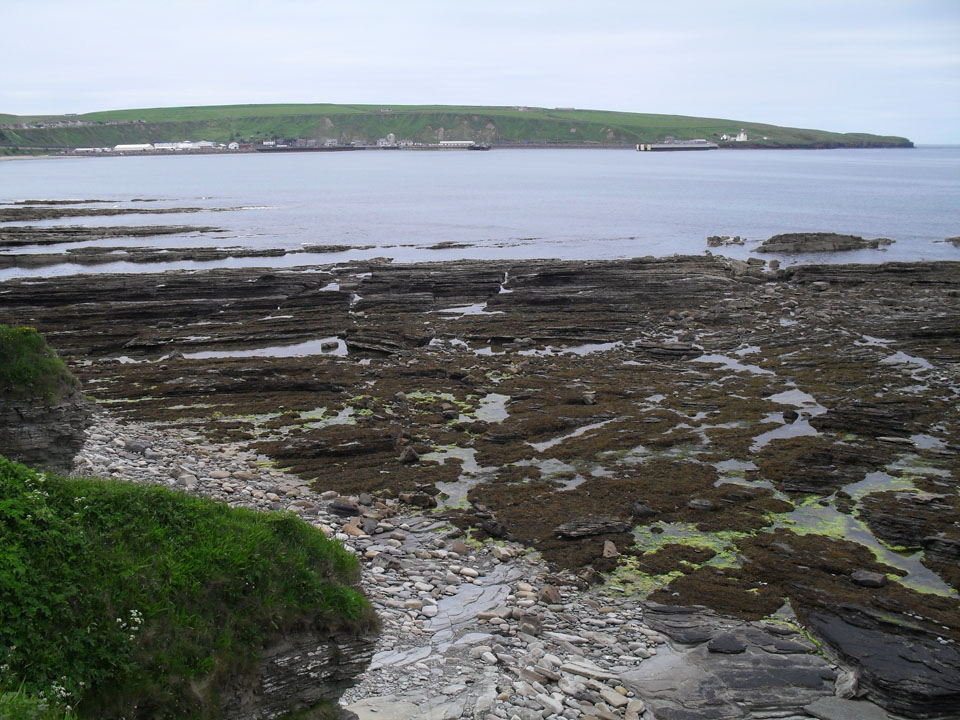
Burnside beach in 2010

Burnside is a predominantly residential area of Thurso, Caithness, in the Highland council area of Scotland.

Much of the district was built up during the latter half of the 20th century, and this development began in the region of the bridge which carries the A9 road over Wolf Burn, at grid reference ND106691. A belt of agricultural land still separates the district from central Thurso.

Wolf Burn flows through the district to enter Thurso Bay and the Atlantic Ocean, midway between Thurso town centre to the east and Scrabster Harbour to the west.

A bishop's castle (Scrabster Castle) was established near the mouth of Wolf Burn while Caithness was part of the Norse earldom of Orkney: foundations are all that now remain.

'The New Weigh Inn' hotel (or motel) is on the eastern edge of the district, at a junction of the A9 road with the A836.
