= Thurso Bay =

Bay in Highland, Scotland

Coordinates: 58°37′N 3°31′W

Thurso Bay, known also as Scrabster Bay, is a bay of Atlantic water between the points of Clairdon Head and Holborn Head on the north coast of Caithness, Scotland.

The bay receives fresh water from the River Thurso and the Wolf Burn. The river mouth is at the most southerly reach of the bay and at least two kilometres from the more northerly and more open waters of the Atlantic. The Atlantic here has Orkney to the northeast and the Pentland Firth and Dunnet Bay to the east. The points of Clairdon Head and Holborn Head are separated by four or five kilometres of water, which is also the bay's widest extent.

Within the bay, about three kilometres west/northwest of the river mouth, Scrabster harbour has deep water in the shelter of Holborn Head and berths a ferry which links mainland Scotland with Stromness in Orkney. Holborn Head Lighthouse is about one kilometre south of the headland's point and close to Scrabster Harbour.

The river mouth serves now as a small harbour and was a busy commercial port during the 19th century. Tidal water reaches inland about one kilometre beyond the river mouth and about twice the distance usually indicated on Ordnance Survey maps. Sandy beach and the burgh of Thurso front the bay west of the river mouth.

Wolf Burn enters the bay at Burnside, midway between the river mouth and Scrabster Harbour.
