= John of Caithness =

John of Caithness (Medieval Gaelic: Eoin; Norse: Jon; Latin: Iohannes) is the second known bishop of Caithness, based then at Halkirk. He witnessed various charters in Scotland between the years 1187 and 1199.

== Biography ==
Bishop John is best known for his mutilation, carried out at Scrabster Castle by Harald Maddadsson, in which the bishop lost his tongue and eyes. The bishop suffered this fate by refusing to collect Peter's Pence, a tax of 1/10 of the income of every freeman. This tax was encouraged by the Papacy, and had a strong history in the Scandinavian world. His predecessor Aindréas had allowed it, but John stood up for the complaints of the peasantry. John certainly survived the attack, although Earl Harald and the people of the Earldom suffered the consequences, as Pope Innocent III and King William of Scotland brought down their wrath on the province.

John's successor Adam appears in the records for the first time in 1213.

== See also ==
Catholic Church titles
Preceded by Aindréas	Bishop of Caithness; 1184x-x1213	Succeeded by Adam
