= Green Holm =

Island north of Burra, Shetland, Scotland

Coordinates: 60°7′29″N 1°18′49″W

Green Holm, (HU382379), is a small uninhabited island 500 metres north of Burra Ness at the north end of the island of Burra and on the west side of the main shipping lane into Scalloway, in Shetland.
