= Wolf Burn =

United Kingdom stream

Coordinates: 58°35′33.5″N 3°32′47.2″W

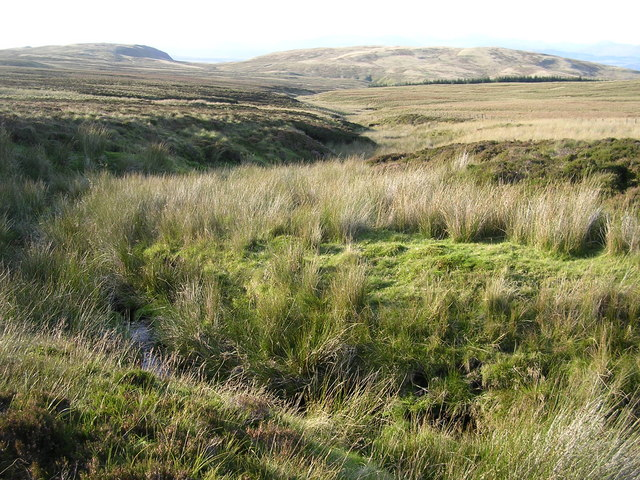
Wolf Burn, Campsie Fells

The Wolf Burn is a small stream, running from a suspect subterranean source behind the Ormlie housing estate in Thurso, Highland Region in the United Kingdom. Its issue is by Burnside, Caithness. The Wolfburn distillery was constructed in 1821 and drew from the stream until it closed in 1872. The distillery was refounded 350 metres from the previous location in 2013.

Few historical records exist, although it is thought to have been owned by a William Smith, and is known to have been present on the first Ordnance Survey map of the region in 1872. It is thought to have been abandoned by 1877.
