= John Abernethy (bishop) =

John Abernethy (c.1570–1639) was a Scottish clergyman who served as Protestant Bishop of Caithness.

== Life ==
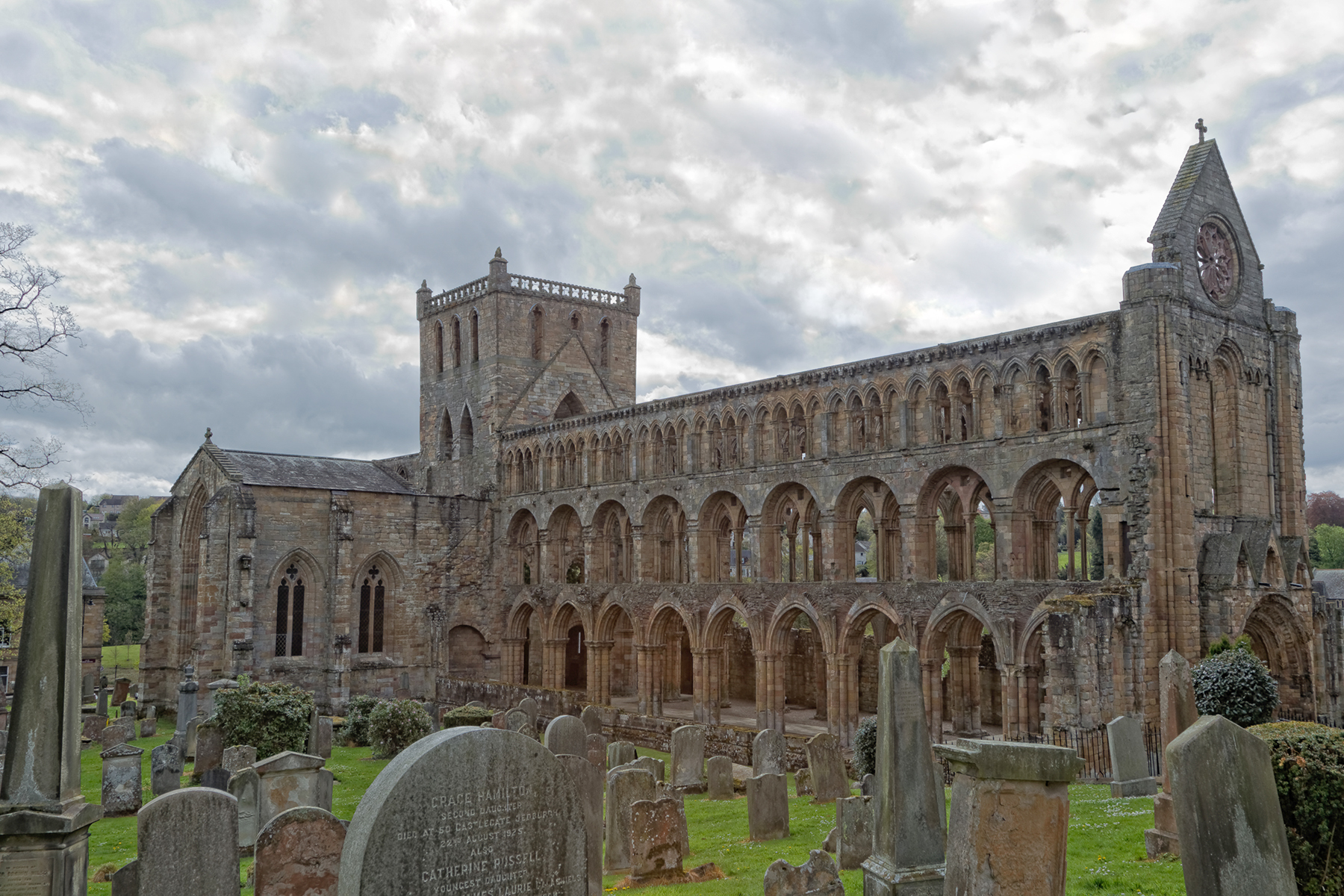
Jedburgh Abbey

Abernethy was born around 1570, the son of Jean Straiton and her husband Thomas Abernethy of Glencorse south of Edinburgh. He was one of the first group of students at the University of Edinburgh under Principal Robert Rollock and graduated MA in 1587.

In 1588 he was made "reader" of Jedburgh church (housed in Jedburgh Abbey and became minister in 1593. In 1606 he opposed Episcopacy and became Constant Moderator of the Presbytery of Jedburgh. Despite this, in December 1616, through the influence of James Law, Archbishop of Glasgow, he was appointed Bishop of Caithness. This title was largely nominal, and he continued his parochial duties in Jedburgh. This promotion was preceded by the award of Doctor of Divinity from the University of Edinburgh and appointment to the Court of the High Commission. He was deprived of his position as Bishop in 1638 and was replaced by Robert Hamilton.

From 1635 to 1639 he seems to have been in dispute with his successor in Jedburgh, John Burnett, who claimed his post, despite it not being vacant. Abernethy died on 24 April 1639. He is buried in Jedburgh.

== Family ==
Abernethy married twice, first in 1600 to Alice Home daughter of Sir David Home of Fishwick, Governor of Dumbarton Castle. Their children included:

- John Abernethy
- Andrew Abernethy, Depute Governor of Edinburgh Castle
- Margaret, married Wauchope of Cakemuir then Sir William Maxwell of Gribton

In 1606 he married Isabella Murray daughter of Patrick Murray of Philiphaugh. Their children included:

- William Abernethy, minister of Thurso
- Anna, married James Murray of Overtoun
- Agnes, married William Ker of Newtown
- Barbara, married John Rutherford of Edgerston
- Elizabeth, married William Ker of Thankles
- Katherine

== Publications ==
- A Christian and Heavenly Treatise containing Physicke for the Soul
- The Duty and Dignity of a Christian
