= Bishop of Caithness =

Medieval Scottish bishopric

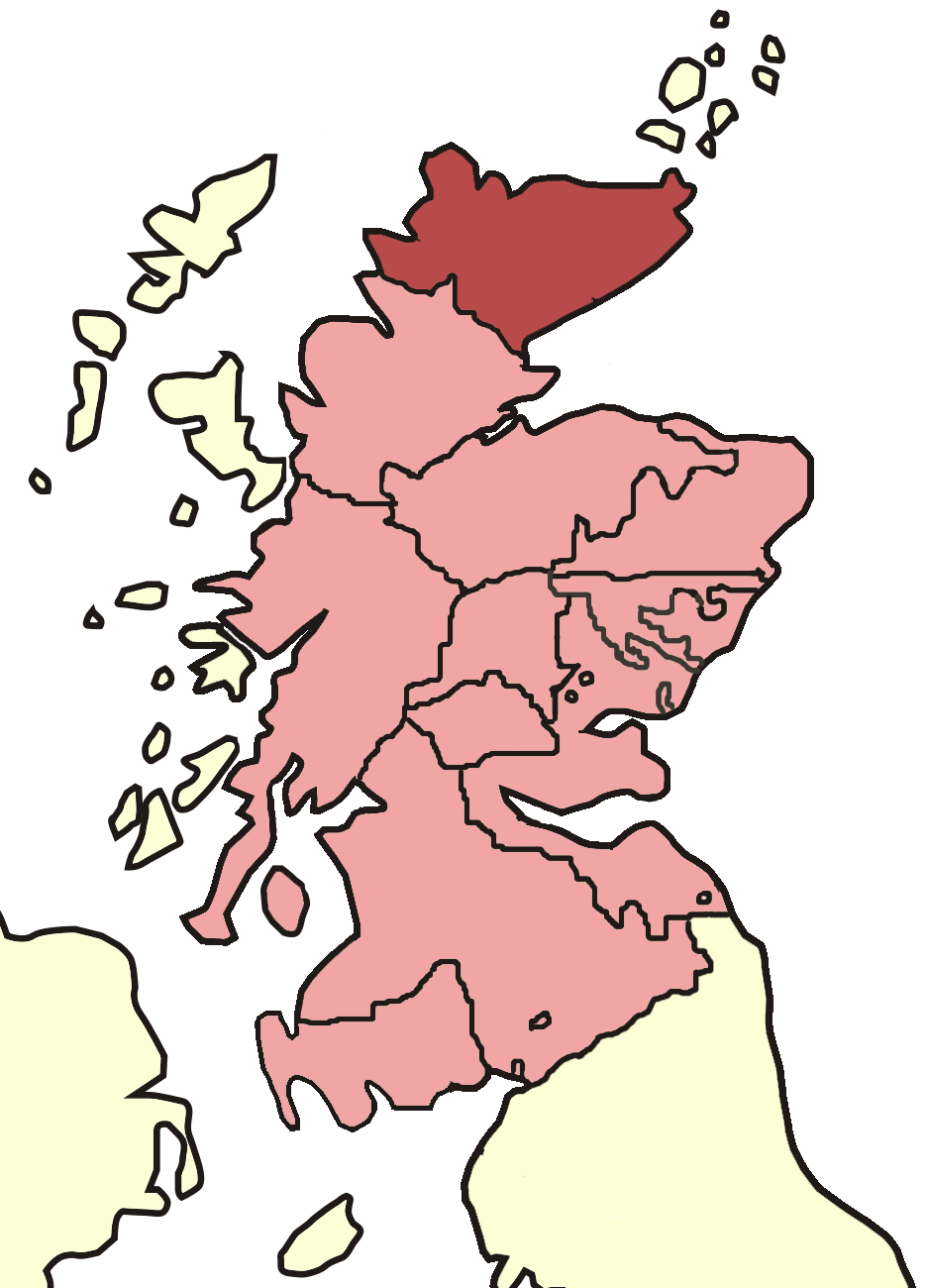
Skene's map of Scottish bishoprics in the reign of David I (reigned 1124–1153).

The Bishop of Caithness was the ecclesiastical head of the Diocese of Caithness, one of Scotland's 13 medieval bishoprics. The first referenced bishop of Caithness was Aindréas, a Gael who appears in sources between 1146 and 1151 as bishop. Aindréas spent much if not all of his career outside his see.

Other bishops before Aindréas are possible, but none is documented. King David I of Scotland, is credited with founding many bishoprics, and it is possible that Caithness was one of them. Little documented history exists before the reign of King David.

The earliest bishops resided at Halkirk, with a castle at Scrabster. Bishop Gilbert de Moravia moved the episcopal seat to Dornoch in what is now Sutherland (then regarded as part of Caithness), and the bishopric remained at Dornoch Cathedral for the remainder of its existence. The Bishopric of Caithness' links with Rome ceased to exist after the Scottish Reformation, but the bishopric continued, saving temporary abolition between 1638 and 1661, under the episcopal Church of Scotland until the Revolution of 1688 led to the permanent abolition of episcopacy in the established church in Scotland (now Presbyterian in government) in 1689.

== List of parishes ==
1. Assynt
2. Bower
3. Canisbay
4. Clyne
5. Creich
6. Dornoch (Cathedral)
7. Dunbeath
8. Dunnet
9. Durness
10. Farr
11. Halkirk
12. Kildonan
13. Kilmalie (later Golspie)
14. Lairg
15. Latheron
16. Loth
17. Olrig
18. Reay
19. Rogart
20. Skinnet
21. Thurso
22. Watten
23. Wick

== List of bishops ==
Tenure (an "x" between two years indicates a range of possible starting or ending dates)	Incumbent	Notes
-	See Notes	Some lists give Angerius Brito; this is in fact Bishop Angerius of Catania in Sicily. Catania and Caithness were often written identically. See G. W. S. Barrow, "Angerius Brito, Cathensis Episcopus", in Traditio, xxvi, (1970), p. 351.
1147 x 1151-1184	Aindréas of Caithness	First known bishop of Caithness; famously, Aindréas is named as a source by the writer of de Situ Albanie.
1184 x 1199-1202	John of Caithness	
1213-1222	Adam of Melrose	Formerly Abbot of Melrose; was burned to death in his kitchen, at Halkirk, by the husbandmen of Caithness, in a tithe revolt.
1222 x 1223-1245	Gilbert de Moravia	Moved the seat of the diocese to Dornoch
1246 x 1247-1255	William	
1263-1270	Walter de Baltrodin	
1272 x 1273	Nicholas	Nicholas had been abbot of Scone. Pope Gregory X refused to confirm his election because of his "intolerable lack of learning".
1274-1275 x 1278	Archibald Heroch	
1278-1279	Richard	Richard had been Dean of Caithness. Richard was old and infirm by the time of his election; Pope Nicholas III persuaded Richard to resign his election rights.
1279-1282	Hervey de Dundee	Hervey was elected to the see after the resignation of Bishop Richard. Hervey died on his way for confirmation at the Papal court.
1282-1291	Alan de St Edmund	
1291 x 1296	John	
1296	Adam de Darlington	
1296-1297 x 1304	Andrew de Buchan	
1304-1321 x 1327	Fearchar Belegaumbe	
1328-1329 x 1341	David	
1341-1342	Alan de Moravia	
1342-1365 x 1369	Thomas de Fingask	
1369-1379 x 1380	Maol Choluim de Drumbreck	Drumbreck (now Dumbreck) is in Aberdeenshire, near Pitmedden
1381-1412	Alexander Man	
1414-1422	Alexander Vaus	
1422-1426	John de Crannach	
1427-1445 x 1446	Robert de Strathbrock	
1446-1447 x 1448	John Innes	
1448-1477	William Mudy	
1478-1484	Prosper Camogli de' Medici	Also known as Prosper Camulio de Janua.
1484	John Sinclair	
1501-1517	Andrew Stewart (elder)	
1517-1540 x 1541	Andrew Stewart (younger)	
1544-1548	Alexander Gordon	Provided by Crown to replace Stewart; resigned claim in 1548.
1542-1586	Robert Stewart	Second son of John Stewart, 3rd Earl of Lennox, and brother of Matthew Stewart, 4th Earl of Lennox. He spent many years as "bishop postulate" in England. He became a reformer, although he retained the title of bishop until his death in 1586.
1586-1587	Robert Pont	
1600-1604	George Gledstanes	Translated to Archbishopric of St Andrews.
1604-1616	Alexander Forbes	
1616-1638	John Abernethy	
1638	Robert Hamilton	Episcopacy abolished in Scotland until Restoration of 1661. Hamilton died in 1649.
1662-1680	Patrick Forbes	
1680-1688/9	Andrew Wood	Episcopacy permanently abolished in the Church of Scotland. He died aged 76 years old, in 1695.

== List of bishopric seats ==
- Bishop's Palace, Halwick
- Bishop's Palace, Scrabster
- Bishop's Palace, Dornoch
