= George Gledstanes =

17th-century Archbishop of St Andrews

George Gledstanes (or Gladstanes; c. 1562 – 1615) was an Archbishop of St Andrews during the seventeenth century.

== Biography ==
=== Early life ===
George Gledstanes was a son of Herbert Gladstanes, clerk of Dundee, and one of the bailies of that town. He was born there between 1560 and 1565, and after spending some time at Dundee Grammar School went in 1576 to the university of St. Andrews, where he graduated Master of Arts in 1580. He probably afterwards studied theology under Andrew Melville. He was for some time a teacher of languages in Montrose, and was appointed reader in that town in 1585. Before 23 July 1587 he was ordained minister of St. Cyrus or Ecclesgreig in Kincardineshire, and had at the same time the church of Aberluthnott, or Marykirk, also under his care. During his residence at St. Cyrus he was on several occasions in danger of his life from armed attacks on his house by William Douglas the younger of Glenbervie and others, but was relieved by the exertions of his neighbours.

=== Introduction to St. Andrews ===
Gladstanes was a member of the general assembly of 1590. In May 1592 he was presented by the king to the vicarage of Arbirlot in Forfarshire, and was again a member of assembly in that year, and also in 1595, when he was nominated with several others as assessors with the king in the choice of two royal chaplains. About this time he served on several commissions appointed by the general assembly, one of which was for advising with the king on church affairs. The ministers in St. Andrews, Messrs. Black and Wallace, having offended by their preaching, the king ordered them to be summarily removed from their charge, and brought Gladstanes from Arbirlot to fill their place. He was inducted at St. Andrews on 11 July 1597, James Melville very reluctantly preaching on the occasion.

=== Career ascendancy ===
When the king in the following year introduced the proposal that the church should be represented in parliament, he was warmly supported in the assembly by Gladstanes, who was appointed one of three commissioners chosen to sit and vote in parliament in name of the ministry. He became vice-chancellor of the university of St. Andrews in July 1599, and on 14 October 1600 was made bishop of Caithness by the king. He sat in parliament as bishop, and was challenged by the synod of Fife, meeting at St. Andrews 3 Feb. 1601, for doing so, when he declared he was obliged to answer ‘with the name of Bishop put against his will, because they would not name him otherwise’.

=== Commissioner for the union, appointment as archbishop ===
Gladstanes continued to be minister of St. Andrews. He was employed by the assembly on various commissions for dealing with the papists, for the plantation of kirks, and for visiting presbyteries. On 24 November 1602 he was admitted a member of the Privy Council of Scotland, being the second clerical member of that body, and after the accession of James VI to the crown of England was appointed in 1604 one of the commissioners for the union of the two kingdoms. He went to London in the latter part of that year, but before starting he, along with his brethren of the presbytery of St. Andrews, renewed the national covenant, or Scots confession of faith, and subscribed it. When at London, on 12 October 1604, he was appointed by James VI archbishop of St. Andrews; but on his return, fearing the displeasure of his co-presbyters, he did not disclose what had taken place. At a meeting of the presbytery on 10 January 1605 he openly declared that he claimed no superiority over his brethren. Some of his friends asked him, according to Calderwood, how he could bear with the presbytery. ‘Hold your tongue,’ he replied; ‘we shall steal them off their feet.’

Gladstanes long refrained from assuming the title of archbishop of St. Andrews. The king required him to resign the old archiepiscopal residence of the castle of St. Andrews, in order that it might be conferred on the Earl of Dunbar, and Gladstanes resigned it formally both at Whitehall and in the Scottish parliament. He received in exchange the provostry of Kirkhill, &c., with an annual pension of three hundred merks (£13. 6s. 8d.). James also compelled him to yield another of the old primatial residences, Monimail, Fife, in order that he might confer it on Sir Robert Melville of Murdocairnie. Gladstanes then obtained a few vicarages in Forfarshire. But at a later date the king purchased back the castle of St. Andrews as a residence for the archbishops of St. Andrews, and Gladstanes dwelt in it for a time.

=== Andrew Melville & Gledstanes ===
Gladstanes had a great aversion to Andrew Melville. Martine states that the king brought Gladstanes to St. Andrews, where Melville was principal of the university, for the very purpose of balancing and putting a check on Melville, and of preventing the students from imbibing Melville's principles. ‘And,’ he adds, ‘many a hote bickering there was between them thereupon’. In a letter to the king on 19 June 1606 Gladstanes says: ‘Mr. Andrew Melvil hath begun to raise new storms with his eolick blasts. Sir, you are my Jupiter, and I under your Highness, Neptune, I must say, Non illi imperium pelagi … sed mihi sorte datur. Your Majesty will relegat him to some Æolia, ut illic vacua se jactet in aula.’ James commanded Melville with certain others to appear before him in London, and he was never permitted to return to St. Andrews. The ostensible occasion of the summons was the king's desire for the conference at Hampton Court, which Gladstanes also attended as one of the representatives of the bishops (22 September 1606). Before going he promised the presbytery of St. Andrews that he would do nothing ‘to prejudice the established discipline of the church.’ The presbytery, however, supplied to Andrew Melville documents to show that Gladstanes had signed the covenant, and forwarded the explanations which he had given to the presbytery after his former visit to London in 1604, to be made use of at court as occasion should require.

=== Canon issues ===
In this year, 1606, the assembly, at the bidding of James, enacted that there should be permanent moderators for presbyteries and synods, and Gladstanes was appointed president of the presbytery of St. Andrews, and also of the synod of Fife. The presbytery proved recalcitrant. The privy council issued a special charge (17 January 1607) to the members to obey the act of assembly within twenty-four hours under pain of being put to the horn or denounced rebels. To secure full submission four commissioners from the king attended the synod meeting at Dysart on 18 August to induct Gladstanes as permanent moderator, but resistance continued. The brethren answered severally they ‘would rather abide the horning and all that follows thereupon than lose the liberty of the kirk’. The leaders of the opposition were imprisoned, and one was put to the horn.

About the same time Gladstanes was empowered to constitute a chapter consisting of any seven of the ministers of his diocese he might choose. He was a zealous member of the Scottish legislature, giving much attention to his duties, both in the privy council and in parliament. In 1609 Gladstanes and James were at variance on a question of the perquisites of the archbishopric, Gladstanes claiming that as of old the estates of bastards, the customs of St. Andrews, and confiscated goods pertained to the episcopal see. James wished them for the crown, and Gladstanes humbly tendered his submission, but asked to be heard on the subject. In the same year he projected another journey to court, and wrote to the king in May asking the requisite permission. In September he was far on his way, and from Standford on the 11th of that month intimated his approach in a letter of remarkable sycophancy, calling James his ‘earthly creator’.

The court of high commission was established shortly after the return of Gladstanes from his visit to London, and was the combined result of the efforts of Gladstanes and his archiepiscopal colleague in the west of Scotland. John Spottiswoode, Gladstanes' successor in the primacy, had already to a large extent supplanted him in the king's estimation. In 1610 Gladstanes begged hard of James to nominate him for the moderatorship of the general assembly, but the king declined.

=== Edinburgh life ===
Gladstanes at this time was a good deal resident in Edinburgh, where, as James Melville states, he kept a ‘splendid establishment,’ and was surrounded by ‘crowds of poor ministers’. Gladstanes in a later letter to James speaks of his influence with complacency. ‘All men,’ he says, ‘do follow us and hunt for our favour upon the report of your majesty's good acceptance of me and the bishop of Caithnes.’ James placed the regulation of the stipends of the clergy in the power of the bishops, and also distributed money among them. In 1610, just before the meeting of the assembly in June, he placed ten thousand merks at the disposal of Archbishops Gladstanes and Spotiswood for the members of that meeting.

=== Eventual consecration ===
Although created a bishop in 1600, Gladstanes had never received consecration at the hands of a prelate. The bishops of Glasgow, Brechin, and Galloway were therefore consecrated at London by Abbot, bishop of London, in November 1610. On their return they consecrated Bishop Gladstanes at St. Andrews, on 13 Jan. 1611, along with several others. After this date he is mentioned as residing in the castle of St. Andrews. He held the bishopric until his death, which took place at St. Andrews on 2 May 1615. It was said to be caused by a loathsome disease. His body had to be buried immediately in the parish church; but a public funeral was accorded to him in the following month at the expense of the king, on 7 June.

== Appreciation ==
Gladstanes, in his connection with the university of St. Andrews, revived the professorship of canon law, to which he nominated his own son-in-law, and he also made great efforts for the restoration of degrees in divinity. On this subject he wrote in 1607, requesting his majesty in his ‘incomparable wisdom’ to send him ‘the form and order of making bachelors and doctors of divinity,’ that he might ‘create one or two doctors to incite others to the same honour, and to encourage our ignorant clergy to learning’. But the royal permission was not granted until the year following Gladstanes' death. Spotiswood, his successor, eulogises him as a man of good learning, ready utterance, and great invention, but of too easy a nature.

== Marriage & descendants ==
Gladstanes married Christian, daughter of John Durie, minister of Montrose, who survived till 1617, and by whom he had one son and three daughters. The son, Alexander, was appointed archdeacon of St. Andrews, and was deposed in 1638. One of the daughters married Sir John Wemyss of Craigton, another John Lyon of Auldbar, and the third, named Elizabeth, married, about 1632, Dr. George Haliburton, whose son George, born in 1635, became bishop of Brechin and Aberdeen.

== Notes ==
- This article incorporates text from a publication now in the public domain: "Gladstanes, George". Dictionary of National Biography. London: Smith, Elder & Co. 1885–1900.

Religious titles
Preceded by Patrick Adamson	Archbishop of St Andrews; 1604–1615	Succeeded by John Spottiswoode
Academic offices
Preceded by 3rd Earl of Montrose	Chancellor of the University of St Andrews; 1604–1615	Succeeded by John Spottiswoode; Archbishop of St Andrews
