= Walter Stewart (15th-century priest) =

Scottish Catholic priest

Walter Stewart was a 15th-century churchman in the Kingdom of Scotland. He was a cousin of King James II of Scotland, being like King James a grandson to King Robert III of Scotland.

== Biography ==
Stewart went to university and obtained a Master of Arts.

He is found as Archdeacon of Dunblane in a document dating to 12 February 1433; it is not known when he had obtained this office, and because the latest known occupation of the office by any predecessor goes back all the way to 1410 x 1411, it cannot be narrowed down significantly.

Walter was still Archdeacon of Dunblane on 3 November 1456 but had given it up the following year for the St Andrews archdeaconry. During his period as Archdeacon of Dunblane he was elected, following the death of Bishop Michael Ochiltree, as Bishop of Dunblane by the cathedral chapter.

His election by the cathedral chapter of the see in 1447 turned out to be fruitless; Robert Lauder had been provided by the Pope in October, and by 29 November Walter has surrendered his rights to the bishopric.

Walter was claiming the right to be Treasurer of Glasgow from 1452, litigating for the honour with two other parties, Thomas Lauder and John Balfour; he resigned the treasurership of Glasgow to Hugh Douglas in order to become Archdeacon of St Andrews: this occurred sometime between 7 June 1455 and October 1457. It is possible it can be more narrowly dated to after 3 November 1456, when he is found still holding the Dunblane archdeaconry.

He was said to have had some right to the Treasurership of the diocese of Dunkeld in January 1456, but the details of this are not clear. He was still in possession of the St Andrews archdeaconry on 26 April 1470 but resigned the position to the Abbot of Holyrood under faculty of Pope Paul II; this happened before 26 July 1471, the date of Pope Paul's death, though it is not until his successor William Scheves is first found occupying the office in 1474 that there can be certainty the resignation had gone through.

Walter had advanced so far in the church because of his royal blood, education and papal indulgence; in 1471 he was a papal chaplain, but was still an acolyte, only in minor orders.

== Notes ==
Religious titles
| Preceded by Thomas Graham (last attested) | Archdeacon of Dunblane; 1408 × 1433–1456 × 1457 | Succeeded by Andrew Purves |
| Preceded by Michael Ochiltree | Bishop of Dunblane (elect); 1447 | Succeeded by Robert Lauder |
| Preceded by Richard Clepham | Treasurer of Glasgow; 1452–1456 × 1457 | Succeeded by Hugh Douglas |
| Preceded by Hugh Douglas | Archdeacon of St Andrews; 1456 × 1457–1471 × 1474 | Succeeded by William Scheves |
