= John Spalding (priest) =

Scottish Catholic clergyman

John Spalding (c. 1418 – after 1487) was a 15th-century churchman based at Brechin in Angus, Scotland. Spalding became Dean of Brechin in 1456; he was confirmed in this position by the Pope on 5 October 1458.

== Biography ==
After the resignation of Robert Lauder as Bishop of Dunblane at the papal curia on 12 September 1466, the Pope provided John Herspolz to that bishopric; King James III of Scotland however, perhaps not aware of the Pope's actions, nominated John Spalding in late 1466 or in 1467; this certainly occurred before 19 November 1467.

Spalding did not become the bishop however, Herspolz being consecrated in the summer or autumn of 1467.

While Dean of Brechin, Spalding had a perpetual appointment as vicarage of the parish church of Dune and of the parish church of Kinel. Spalding's yearly revenues did not exceed thirty pounds sterling for each.

Spalding retained his deanery until 1487, despite being challenged by John Barry from 1477 onwards. On 17 February 1487, Spalding exchanged the deanery of Brechin for the precentorship of the cathedral with Hugh Douglas; Spalding was said to be 69 years old on this occasion.

Religious titles
Preceded by William Forbes	Dean of Brechin; 1456–1487	Succeeded by Hugh Douglas
