= Maurice of Inchaffray =

Scottish cleric

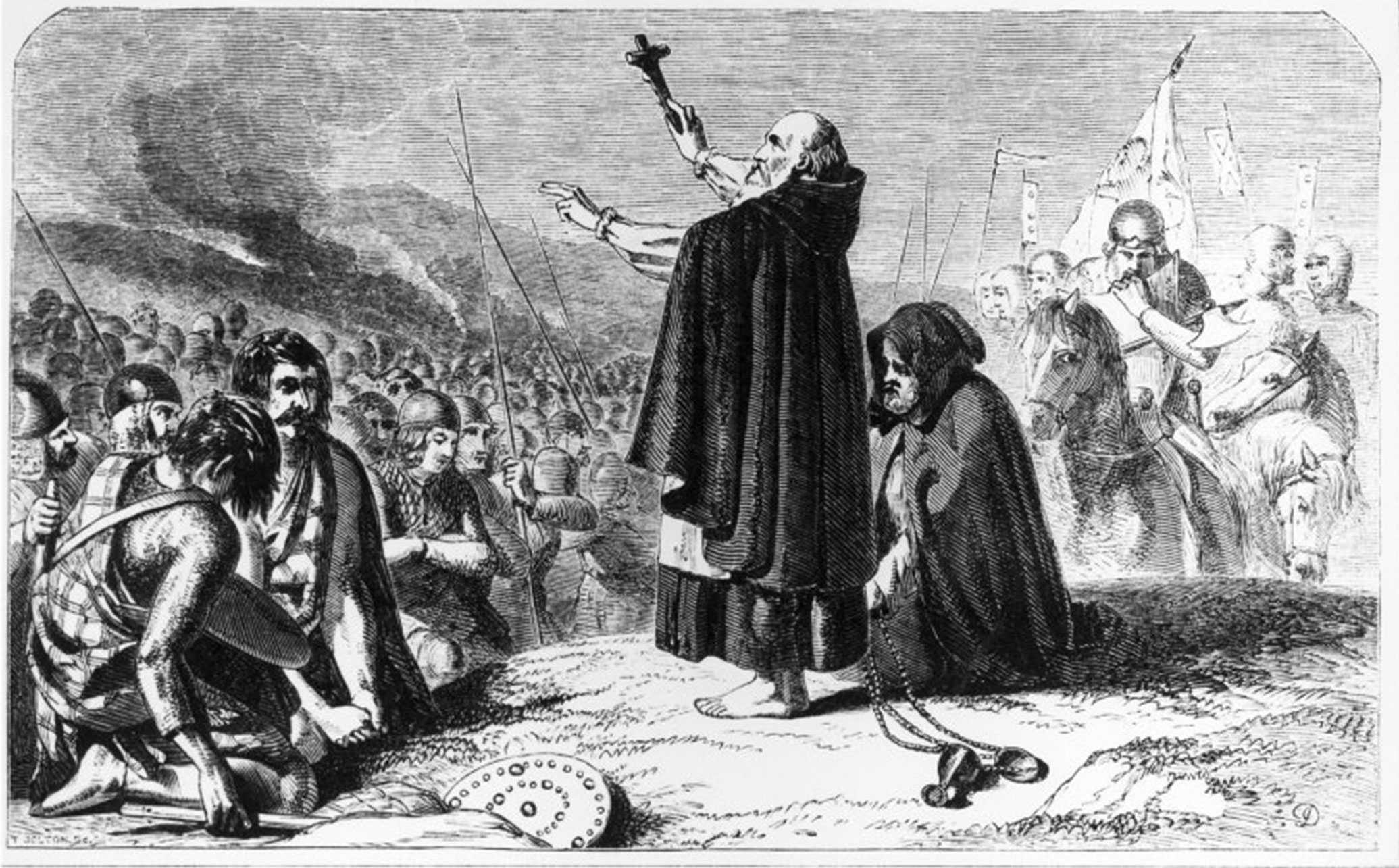
Maurice blessing the Scottish army at Bannockburn.

Maurice (Scottish Gaelic: Muireach or Muireadhach) was a 14th-century Scottish cleric who became Prior of Inchmahome, Abbot of Inchaffray and then Bishop of Dunblane. He was Prior of Inchmahome Priory in Menteith after 1297. He became abbot of Inchaffray Abbey in Strathearn between March 1304 and October 1305. As Abbot of Inchaffray, he held a canonry in the diocese of Dunblane, that is, the precentorship of Dunblane Cathedral (also in Strathearn). After the death of Nicholas de Balmyle, he was elected to the bishopric of Dunblane. He was consecrated to the see before 23 March 1322, after litigation at the Papal court. King Edward II of England had nominated one Richard de Pontefract to the see, while Roger de Ballinbreich had also been elected by the chapter; both of these men were overlooked by the Pope in Maurice's favour.

Maurice has achieved some popular fame because of his role as an early supporter of King Robert I of Scotland and as chaplain at the Battle of Bannockburn. Maurice was probably one of the people who helped Robert after his defeat at the Battle of Methven in 1305. Robert I's first recorded act as king involved Abbot Maurice, who was given a "credence" (like empowering a Plenipotentiary or possessor of Power of Attorney) to speak with Maol Íosa III, Earl of Strathearn on his behalf. Maurice was in England with a grant of safe-conduct in January 1313, probably on a mission to attempt to make peace between the two kings. At the Battle of Bannockburn in 1314, Maurice was the chaplain of the Scottish army and gave an encouraging speech and blessing to the Scottish soldiers. According to a legendary account found in the writings of Hector Boece, Maurice brought to the battlefield the silver reliquary known to contain the left arm-bone of St Fillan, but for safety left the actual arm of the saint in the monastery. The arm-bone, however, miraculously made its own way to the battlefield where it helped bring the Scots victory.

His later career is largely unrecorded. He died in the 1340s, definitely before 23 October 1347, when William de Cambuslang, his successor as Bishop of Dunblane, was consecrated.

== Notes ==
Religious titles
Preceded by Adam	Prior of Inchmahome; 1297 x 1309	Succeeded by Crístin
Preceded by Thomas	Abbot of Inchaffray; 1303 x 1305–1322	Succeeded by Crístin
Preceded by Nicholas de Balmyle	Bishop of Dunblane; 1319 x 1322–x 1347	Succeeded by William de Cambuslang
