= Walter de Coventre =

14th-century Scottish ecclesiastic

- Bishop of Dunblane
- Walter's name as written on a charter of 1365: (dative) domino Waltero dei Gracia Episcopo Dunblanensi "Lord Walter, by God's grace, Bishop of Dunblane"
- Church: Roman Catholic Church
- See: Diocese of Dunblane
- In office: 1361–1371 or 1372
- Predecessor: William de Cambuslang
- Successor: Andrew Magnus
- Previous posts: Dean of Aberdeen (1348–1361) + various other benefices (see text)

Orders
- Consecration: Between 18 June and 23 August 1361

Personal details
- Born: unknown
- Died: Between 27 March 1371 and 27 April 1372

Walter de Coventre (died 1371 or 1372) was a 14th-century Scottish ecclesiastic. There is no direct evidence of his birthdate, his family, or his family's origin, although he may have come from the region around Abernethy (in modern-day Perth and Kinross), where a family with the name de Coventre is known to have lived. Walter appeared in the records for the first time in the 1330s, as a student at the University of Paris. From there he went on to the University of Orléans, initially as a student before becoming a lecturer there. He studied the arts, civil law and canon law, and was awarded many university degrees, including two doctorates. His studies were paid for, at least partially, by his benefices in Scotland. Despite holding perhaps more than five benefices at one stage, he did not return to Scotland until the late 1350s.

Following his return to Scotland, Walter soon became Dean of Aberdeen Cathedral. From there he became engaged in high-level ecclesiastical affairs with the Scottish church and political affairs with the Earl of Mar. Sometime before June 1361, the cathedral chapter of Dunblane elected him Bishop of Dunblane. He went to France to secure confirmation from the Pope at Avignon, who authorised his consecration. Walter was bishop for 10 years after returning home to Scotland. Records of his episcopate are thin, but there are enough to allow a modest reconstruction of his activities: he presided over legal disputes, issued a dispensation for an important irregular marriage, attended parliaments, and acted as an envoy of the Scottish crown in England. He died in either 1371 or 1372.

== Background ==
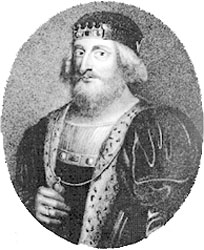
Portrait of David II, king of the Scots for most of Walter's life

Walter de Coventre was typical of a new class of men in 14th-century Scotland, the university-educated career cleric from the lower nobility. Such men often acquired university education through their family resources, through the patronage of more substantial nobles, or through church influence, particularly support from the pope and his court. Patronage gave access to the resources needed to finance the considerable expense of a 14th-century university education, particularly through the presentation of benefices, gifts of land or income made by the church.

Scotland had no universities in de Coventre's time, requiring travel either to England or Continental Europe to acquire a university education. Continental Europe, particularly France, was the favoured destination, partly because of bad relations between Scotland and England. After their university education, some Scottish graduates chose to remain abroad and teach at a foreign university or to serve the papacy; most returned to Scotland and offered their services to the king, a magnate, or an ecclesiastical institution. The ultimate reward for such services was a bishopric, which brought wealth, prestige, and a "job for life".

Walter de Coventre's life is not well documented. There are no biographies, and no histories or chronicles devote any space to him. His activities can be traced only through a small number of incidental references in legal deeds, church documents and papal records. No modern historian has written a monograph about him, and the most extensive attempt to reconstruct his life in modern literature is a two-page entry in D. E. R. Watt's Biographical Dictionary of Scottish Graduates to A.D. 1410 (1977). James Hutchison Cockburn, in his Medieval Bishop of Dunblane and their Church (1959) devoted seven less extensively sourced pages, but they emphasized the analysis of a few events during de Coventre's episcopate, and the events of his time.

During most of de Coventre's recorded lifetime Scotland was ruled by King David II. Coming to the throne at age five, King David was driven into exile in France at the age of ten. In the 1330s, civil war raged in Scotland as those loyal to David fought Edward Balliol and his English backers. In some sense, the conflict became a side-show of the Hundred Years' War, and David resided at Château Gaillard in northern France for much of his exile, until he could return to Scotland in 1341. In 1346, in response to a plea from France to come to its aid, David led an army into England only to be taken prisoner at Neville's Cross; he remained in captivity until he was ransomed in 1357. David's exile in France corresponded with Walter's own period in that country, prompting one historian to suggest that Walter was part of David's court while both were in northern France, and that Walter subsequently benefited from the relationship.

== Biography ==
=== Origins and personal background ===
James Hutchison Cockburn, a historian of Dunblane's medieval bishops, assumed that Walter's surname derived from the town of Coventry in England. D. E. R. Watt has suggested that the medieval settlement of Coventre or Covintrie near Abernethy in the diocese of Dunblane was the origin of the name.

There is no direct evidence of de Coventre's family, but two other men bearing the name "de Coventre" are known to have been active during Walter's lifetime. A "John de Coventre" is found registered as a student at the University of Paris on 21 January 1331. Before December 1341, when he resigned, John de Coventre held the parish church of Inverarity, Angus, in the diocese of St Andrews. On 7 December 1345, a William de Coventre, also from the diocese of Dunblane, held a canonry and prebends (a cathedral priesthood with stipends) in the diocese of Ross and the Collegiate Church of Abernethy, when he was granted the church of Inverarity that had previously been held by John de Coventre. William thus appears to have succeeded John (and later Walter succeeded William) to all of these benefices.

Watt suggested that all three were brothers, John the first-born, William the second-born, and Walter the youngest of the three. He further suggested that the family was probably closely connected to Margaret de Abernethy, heiress of the old lay abbots and lords of Abernethy. Margaret had patronage over both the church of Abernethy and, as probable owner of the barony of Inverarity, the church there.

=== Early life ===
==== Education ====
By Lent, 1333: Bachelor in the Arts
Between 1333 and 1335: Licentiate in the Arts
Between 1333 and 1345: Master in the Arts
Between 1337 and 1345: Licentiate in Civil Law
By October 1349: Doctor in Civil Law
Between 1350 and 1351: Bachelor in Decrees (Canon Law)
Between 1351 and 1359: Doctor of Both Laws (Canon & Civil)

De Coventre received a B.A. under John de Waltirstone from the University of Paris by Lent, 1333. Although he had probably completed a Licentiate in the Arts and a Master of Arts by 1335, because of gaps in the Paris records it is not certain that he was a Master until April 1345.

He moved on to study civil law at the University of Orléans, and by 24 March 1337, he was serving as the proctor of the Scottish Nation in Orléans. By 7 December 1345, he had received a Licentiate in Civil Law. On 20 December 1348 he was at Avignon as an envoy of his university, and while there he obtained a grace regarding his own benefice holding from Pope Clement VI. On 7 October 1349, Pope Clement granted an indult to Walter allowing him to be absent from his cure while he continued his studies at Orléans.

He may already have been a Doctor of Civil Law by that point, because in the following year, on 22 November 1350, he is found as such acting as the Regent of Orléans presenting a candidate for licence. Having studied civil law for the highest qualification available, de Coventre moved on to canon law. By 28 March 1351, he possessed a Bachelorate in Decrees (canon law). This was perhaps why on 16 April 1353, he obtained from Pope Innocent VI another grace for himself. Precisely when he obtained his doctorate is unclear, but he was D. U. J. (doctor utriusque juris), Doctor of Both Laws, by 4 September 1359.

==== Benefices ====
1345 (or before) until 1361: Ross canonry and prebend
1345 (or before) until between 1348 and 1351: Abernethy canonry and prebend
1345: Failed provision to Archdeaconry of Dunblane
1348–1361: Deanery of Aberdeen
1351–1353: Failed provision to a St Andrews benefice
1352–1361: Dunkeld canonry and prebend
1353: Failed provision to Moray canonry and prebend
c. 1353–1361: Inverarity parish (St Andrews)

Walter's first known benefices were a canonry (with prebend) in the Collegiate Church of Abernethy and a prebend in the diocese of Ross, northern Scotland, which he was holding by 12 April 1345. None of these benefices, neither parish nor office, are known by name. While Walter would retain his Ross benefice until becoming Bishop of Dunblane, he lost his Abernethy benefice at some point between 20 December 1348 and 28 March 1351. During that period he obtained another unnamed prebend in exchange for the Abernethy prebend. Walter is only the second known canon of Abernethy Collegiate Church.

On 12 April 1345, he was granted a canonry in the diocese of Dunkeld with expectation of a prebend, but does not appear to have obtained this in practice, although he did obtain a different Dunkeld canonry with prebend on 12 May 1352. This he retained until his consecration as Bishop of Dunblane in 1361. Walter also obtained a fourth prebend in this period. He had been pursuing a benefice in the diocese of St Andrews, and while he was granted this on 28 March 1351, the grant was still not effective by 16 April 1353, when he was granted a prebend in the diocese of Moray instead. This was not effective either, but Walter did eventually obtain a St Andrews diocese benefice, namely the church of Inverarity in Angus, which had become vacant on the death of its incumbent, William de Coventre, probably Walter's older brother. On 7 December 1345, Walter was appointed (provided) as Archdeacon of Dunblane, his most substantial benefice to date, but the appointment does not appear to have been carried through.

Walter obtained one more benefice during this period. On 20 December 1348, he was made Dean of Aberdeen Cathedral, a high-ranking office which Walter was not technically eligible to hold without a papal grace, being only a sub-deacon in orders. The deanery had been made vacant by the death of the long-serving Gilbert Fleming. Although in July the Pope had given it as an extra prebend for Annibald de Ceccano, Cardinal Bishop of Tusculum, this had been cancelled by 20 December, when it was given to Walter instead.

These benefices provided an income without the obligation to perform any pastoral services. Their revenues were assigned to pay for his studies, leaving poorly paid vicars to carry out the pastoral work. Walter remained as a teacher and official at Orléans, perhaps without returning to Scotland at all, until the late 1350s, by when he would have been absent from his native country for more than 25 years. In an Aberdeen document dated 12 July 1356, it was noted that he was still absent from his post.

=== Bishop of Dunblane ===
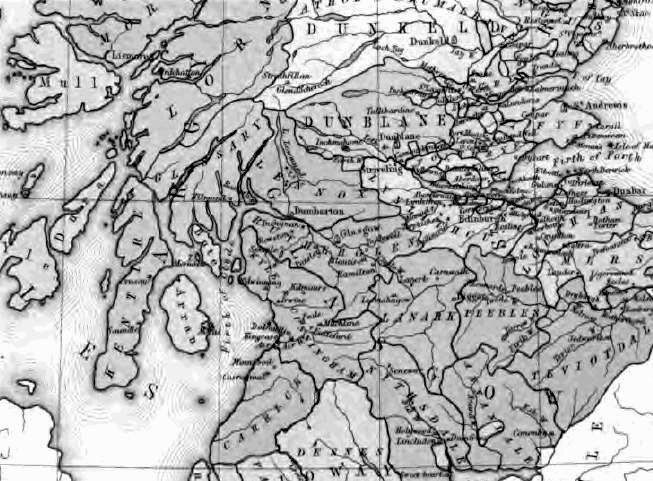
A 19th-century map of the diocese of Dunblane and its surrounding dioceses. Abernethy, although physically separate from most of the rest of the diocese of Dunblane, was nevertheless part of that diocese.

==== Return to Scotland and episcopal election ====
Walter cannot be traced back in Scotland with certainty before his appearance as a witness to a charter of Thomas, Earl of Mar, on 9 July 1358. He may have returned a year earlier, as a document dated sometime between November 1357 and April 1359 records him in the sheriffdom of Forfar (royal demesne in Angus) assisting a justice ayre. He appears again on 4 September 1359, witnessing another charter of Earl Thomas at the latter's residence of Kildrummy Castle.

Following the death in 1361 of William de Cambuslang, Bishop of Dunblane, Walter was elected by the Dunblane cathedral chapter to be the new bishop. On his election, Walter possessed no benefices in the diocese, and had had none since giving up his Abernethy prebend a decade before. However, it was probably the diocese of his birth, and he had almost become archdeacon of the diocese in 1345.

Walter, bishop-elect, travelled to the papal court at Avignon, and was provided (appointed) as bishop by Pope Innocent on 18 June 1361. The papal letter of provision expressed displeasure that the chapter (by electing) and Walter (by accepting the election) were ignoring a previous papal reservation of the bishopric. Pope Innocent quashed the election, but nevertheless agreed to appoint (provide) Walter to the bishopric.

Walter may have been consecrated soon after, probably by 23 August. It was on that date that he presented a roll of petitions to the Pope on behalf of several Scotsmen, including Michael de Monymusk, future Bishop of Dunkeld. On 20 September, Bishop Walter made a "promise of services" to the papacy, the first payment of which was delivered to Avignon in 1363 by Walter's proctor.

==== Early episcopate ====
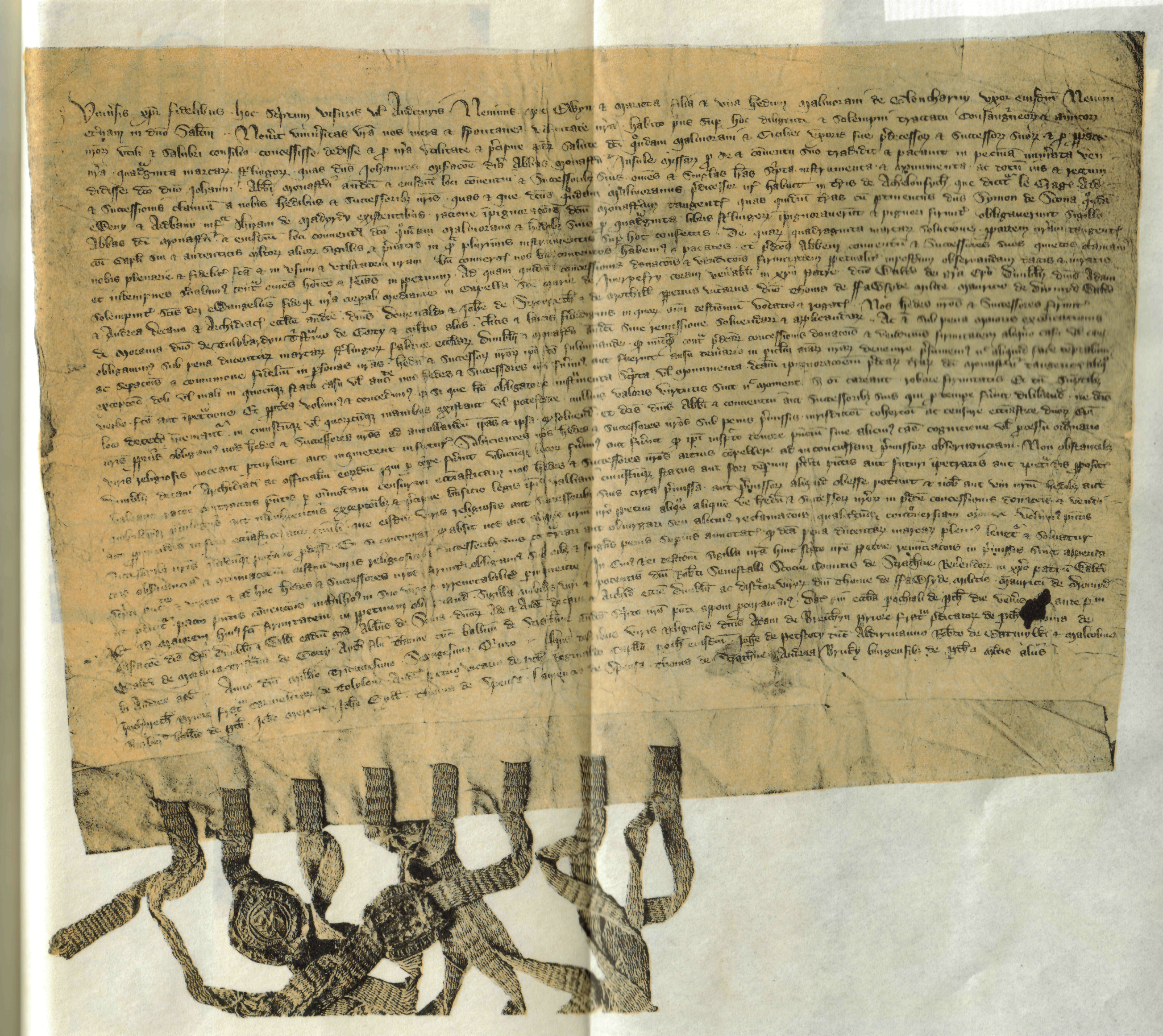
A document confirming the surrender of deeds by Naomhán Mac Eóghainn and his wife, which Walter oversaw

Walter had returned to Scotland by 30 June 1362, when his presence is attested at Partick near Glasgow. The document in which Walter is mentioned recorded that William Rae, Bishop of Glasgow, along with his cathedral chapter, agreed to put a dispute to arbitration.

The remainder of his episcopate is not well documented. His only surviving episcopal deed was issued at Abernethy on 8 February 1365. The deed authorised the reduction of canons at Abernethy Collegiate Church from ten to five, adding the consent of the patroness Margaret, Countess of Angus. These details are also recorded in a papal letter to the Bishop of St Andrews in 1373:

Recently a petition of the secular Prior and Chapter [of Abernethy] for confirmation described how the [Collegiate] Church was founded by lay patrons for a prior and five canons. At a later date some of the patrons were eager to augment its rents, and the number of canons was hopefully raised to ten. No such augmentation took place, and because of wars, fires and ruin the Prior and Chapter were brought to straits. Bishop Walter, therefore, with the assent of the patrons and King David, reduced the canons to five.

The changes were confirmed by the Pope on 31 October 1375, several years after Bishop Walter's death.

A document of Inchaffray Abbey, preserved in the original (as opposed to a later copy), recorded that Bishop Walter had been involved in settling a dispute involving Inchaffray, an abbey which lay in his diocese. Inchaffray's dispute was with Naomhán Mac Eóghainn (Nevin MacEwen) and his wife Mairead (Mariota). Under Abbot Symon de Scone, previous Abbot of Inchaffray, the abbey had given some lands in exchange for 40 marks to Mairead's father Maol Mhuire (Malmoran) of Glencarnie.

Under the new abbot, Abbot John, the abbey sought the return of those lands. The case appears to have gone to Bishop Walter's consistorial court, which he held at the chapel of Innerpeffry. Here Naomhán and Mairead agreed to accept a payment of 40 marks in exchange for returning the documents of ownership given to them by the abbot and for acknowledging the abbey's ownership. The couple pledged to honour the agreement by swearing an oath on the chapel's Gospels. The case then proceeded to a hearing held under Robert Stewart, Earl of Strathearn and High Steward of Scotland (later King Robert II), at Perth, where the couple were forced under the threat of severe penalties to swear again never to renew their claim. The decision was sealed by the witnesses, including Bishop Walter, at a Perth church on 30 November 1365.

==== Final years ====
On 13 March 1366, Walter was commissioned by the papacy to authorise dispensation for the irregular marriage between John Stewart, Earl of Carrick (much later King Robert III) and Annabella Drummond.

Bishop Walter attended at least five meetings of the Scottish national parliament during his episcopate. He was present at the Scone parliament of 27 September 1367, which discussed royal revenues and relations with the English crown. He was also present at the Scone parliament of June 1368, and the Perth parliament of 6 March 1369; the latter discussed royal business, relations with the Kingdom of England and the Kingdom of Norway, and law and order in the Scottish Highlands. Robert Stewart, Thomas, Earl of Mar, Uilleam III, Earl of Ross, and other Highland lords, were ordered to impose greater control in their regions. Bishop Walter took part in two parliamentary committees, the first a clerical committee devoted to general business, and the second a judicial committee authorised to review earlier legal judgments in the kingdom.

The parliament's discussions on Anglo-Scottish relations preceded peace negotiations later in the year, at which Bishop Walter was one of the Scottish envoys. There was some urgency behind the matter, in view of the impending end to the five-year Anglo-Scottish truce agreed by King Edward III of England on 20 May 1365. King David travelled to London, where he resided in May and June, in order to take part in the negotiations. Walter and the rest of the embassy, which included four other bishops, were in London by June 1369, the month in which Edward agreed to a new truce. When it was ratified by the Scots at Edinburgh on 20 July, Bishop Walter was again present, as a witness.

Walter attended the Perth parliament of 18 February 1370, and was named as one of the members of a special committee "for the deliberation concerning the consideration of common justice". He is mentioned for the last time swearing fealty to the new king, Robert II, at his accession parliament at Scone on 27 March 1371. Walter de Coventre must have died later in 1371 or in very early 1372, because on 27 April 1372, the Pope appointed Andrew Magnus to the vacant bishopric of Dunblane.

== Notes ==
Catholic Church titles
Preceded by Gilbert Fleming / Annibald de Ceccano (provision cancelled)	Dean of Aberdeen; 1348–1361	Succeeded by Michael de Monymusk
Preceded by William de Cambuslang	Bishop of Dunblane; 1361–1371 or 1372	Succeeded by Andrew Magnus
