= Andrew Magnus =

Scottish prelate

Andrew Magnus (died 1380) was a 14th-century Scottish prelate. Of unknown background, he is recorded for the first time in a document dating to 28 November 1365, holding the position of Archdeacon of Dunblane. Having merely been collated to this position by an ordinary, perhaps the Bishop of Dunblane Walter de Coventre, he received a fresh papal provision on 6 January 1367.

Following the death of Bishop Walter de Coventre sometime in the year after 21 March 1371, Andrew was elected as Bishop of Dunblane by the cathedral chapter of the diocese; he was provided to the see by Pope Gregory XI on 27 April 1372. On 1 July 1372 he and all the other bishops of Scotland were ordered by the papacy to collect one tenth of their annual revenue "in aid of the defence of the Pope and the Roman Church in Italy".

Few other things are known of his episcopate or his life. Pope Gregory XI wrote to Bishop Andrew in 1375 requesting that the Bishop furnish Thomas Stewart and his brother James Stewart, illegitimate sons of King Robert II of Scotland, with benefices and to issue a dispensation for their legitimacy. In 1380, the Pope requested that the Bishop of Dunblane confirm the annexation of the church of St Columba in Tiree to Ardchattan Priory; in the same year, a Bishop of Dunblane, probably Andrew, confirmed the election of William de Culross as the new Abbot of Inchaffray.

Andrew died sometime later in the year. As late as 1 September 1380, officials at the papal curia believed that he was still alive; but Andrew was definitely dead by 12 September, when his successor Dúghall de Lorne was provided to the vacant bishopric; the officials must have been wrong in their belief, as Dúghall had already been elected at Dunblane, and the interval must have been large enough both for the election to have been organised and for news of the election to have arrived in southern France by 12 September, almost certainly more than twelve days.

Bishop Andrew's seal survives appended to the Act made at Scone on 4 April 1373, settling the succession of the Scottish crown. He is known to have had a kinsman, Michael by name, to whom he provided the perpetual vicarage Abernethy, despite the fact that this Michael was "under age and illiterate".

== Notes ==
Religious titles
Preceded by Nicholas de Kinbuck	Archdeacon of Dunblane; 1365–1372	Succeeded by David Bell
Preceded by Walter de Coventre	Bishop of Dunblane; 1372–1380	Succeeded by Dúghall de Lorne
