= Dúghall of Lorne =

- Bishop of Dunblane
- Church: Roman Catholic Church
- See: Diocese of Dunblane
- In office: 1380–1403
- Predecessor: Andrew Magnus
- Successor: Fionnlagh MacCailein

Orders
- Consecration: 12 September 1380 × 13 February 1381

Personal details
- Born: unknown Lorne (?)
- Died: 1403

Dúghall (or Dougal or Dougall) of Lorne [or de Ergadia] (died 1403) was a late 14th century and early 15th century prelate in the Kingdom of Scotland. Probably a MacDúghaill (MacDougall) from the province of Lorne in Argyll, he appears to have studied at the University of Oxford before returning to Scotland for an ecclesiastical and administrative career. He obtained benefices in the diocese of Argyll, Dunkeld, Dunblane and St Andrews, and acted as the secretary and chaplain of Robert Stewart, Earl of Fife (after 1398, Duke of Albany), before becoming Bishop of Dunblane. He held the bishopric of Dunblane until his death in 1403.

== Biography ==
=== Background and early career ===
Dúghall was from the diocese of Argyll. His surname is given variously as de Lorne (of Lorne) or as de Ergadia (of Argyll), the surnames used by the higher-ranking members of the MacDúghaill kindred and the old lords of Argyll; he was certainly a kinsman of John Gallda, the MacDúghaill Lord of Argyll who died sometime between 1371 and 1388. He was misidentified in Wood's Peerage (and those using that work thereafter) as a son of Sir John Drummond of Stobhall, the baillie of the abthainy of Dull, and wife Mary de Montifex or Montfichet; this would have made him a brother of Anabella Drummond, wife and queen to King Robert III of Scotland. He is styled Petri in a few sources, meaning perhaps that his father's name was Peadar (or Peter), though this is far from certain as that name was unusual at the time anywhere in Scotland.

On 30 March 1364 Dúghall was granted a safe-conduct by the English crown to come study at the University of Oxford for two years; it was later related in a document dating to June 1380 that he had studied both canon law and Roman law for three years. Dúghall is found holding the parish church of Kilmore on 12 October 1371; this church was in the patronage of John Gallda. As there was a perpetual vicar at the time, Kilmore must have been held without cure, i.e. allowing Dúghall to enjoy the revenues without having any pastoral obligations in the parish. Kilmore seems to have been turned into a prebend of Lismore Cathedral by the end of the decade, and Dúghall is found as a canon and prebendary of the diocese of Argyll by 11 March 1380.

The papal bull confirming the erection of this new prebend did not come however until 5 May that year, shortly before Dúghall became bishop of the neighbouring diocese of Dunblane. This letter stated that Dúghall "also holds a canonry and prebend in the diocese of Dunkeld". Dúghall can be found holding a canonry and prebend in the diocese of Dunblane as early as 23 November 1375, a prebend he held in plurality with Kilmore in Argyll. On 11 March 1380 he was provided to yet another benefice in the diocese of St Andrews, and then to another prebend and canonry in the diocese of Dunblane. By 1380, he was the secretary and chaplain of Robert Stewart, Earl of Fife (later Duke of Albany), son of King Robert II of Scotland. At Avignon on 2 June 1380, he presented a roll of petitions on the Fife's behalf to the pope.

=== Bishop of Dunblane ===
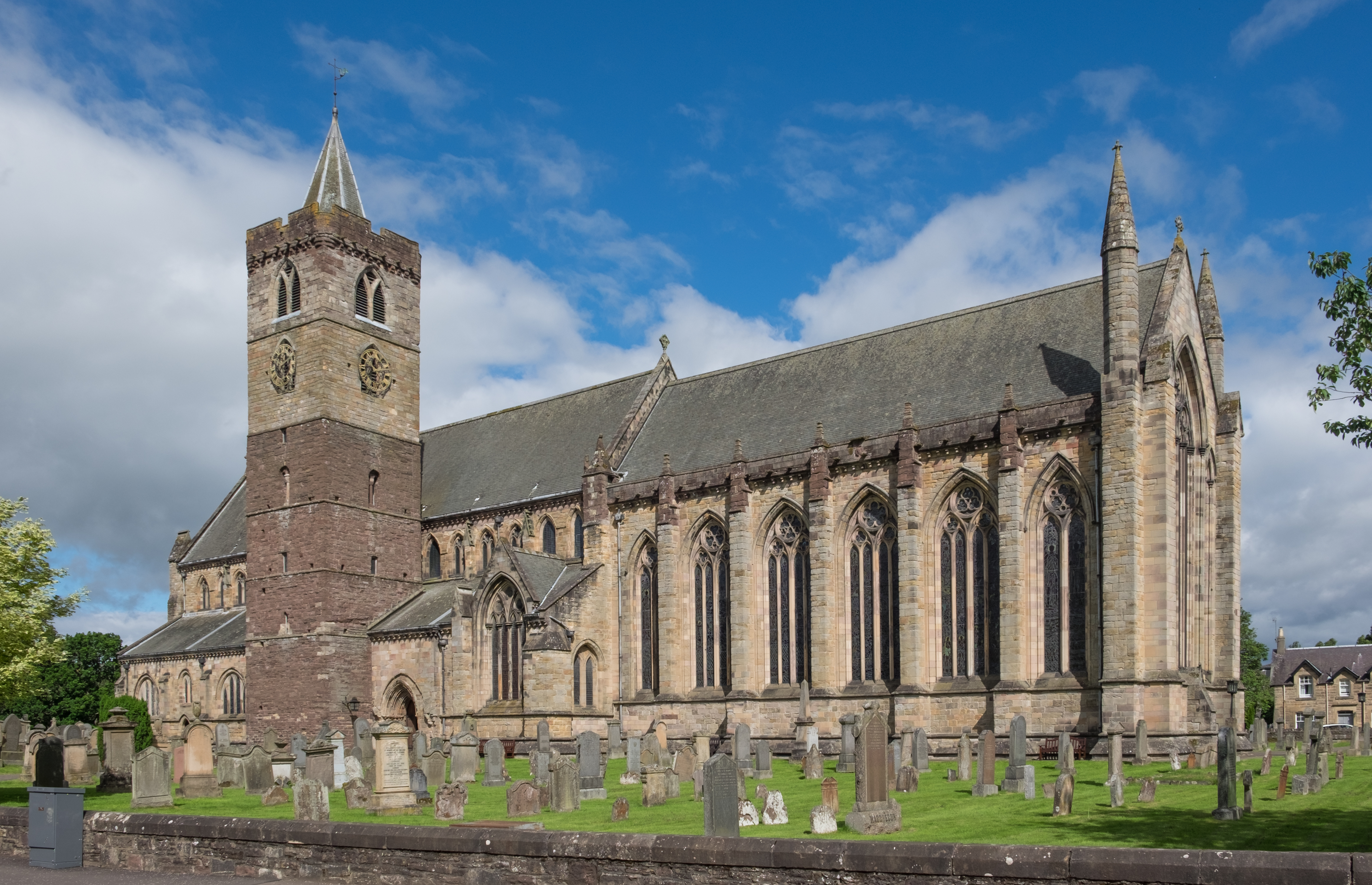
Dunblane Cathedral, seat (cathedra) of the Bishop of Dunblane.

On 12 September 1380, while still at Avignon, he was provided by Antipope Clement VII to the bishopric of Dunblane; this provision apparently followed an earlier election. He had almost certainly received consecration by 11 October but his consecration had certainly occurred by 13 February 1381. On the latter date he was back in the Kingdom of Scotland, witnessing a charter of David Stewart, Earl of Strathearn, brother of the earl of Fife.

Thereafter notice of Bishop Dúghall in the surviving sources is limited. He is next found on 1 October 1392 witnessing two charters of Euphemia I, Countess of Ross at Stirling, the royal burgh on the edges of Menteith and the diocese of Dunblane. A papal mandate of 27 October 1394 provided one Dómhnall de Bute as Dean of Dunblane, annulling Bishop Dúghall's own provision of Dómhnall made "in ignorance of the reservation" earlier made by the pope. On 4 September 1395 the bishop is mentioned in a papal document concerning the succession to one of the churches in his diocese. In 1396, it is known that he travelled to Avignon once again; a roll of petitions presented by Dúghall on behalf of 20 Scottish people and 3 continental Europeans was granted by Pope Benedict XIII on 1 August 1396.

The last ever notice of Dúghall occurs in a charter of the lord of Byres, wherein Dúghall appears along with the Duke of Albany and Walter Trail, Bishop of St Andrews; the charter can be dated between 1398 (creation of the Duchy of Albany) and 1401 (the death of Walter Trail). It was not known for certain that he was dead until 10 September 1403, when his successor Fionnlagh MacCailein was provided as the new Bishop of Dunblane. It is likely his death occurred not long before the last date. A papal letter of 27 April 1413 claimed that he had granted a dispensation in order to allow Elizabeth de Danielston to marry Robert de Maxwell. There are indications that Bishop Dúghall may have increased the number of canons at Dunblane Cathedral, but this is very far from certain.

== Notes ==
Religious titles
Preceded by Andrew Magnus	Bishop of Dunblane; 1380–1403	Succeeded by Fionnlagh MacCailein
