= John Herspolz =

John Herspolz or John Hepburn (died 1486) was Bishop of Dunblane. On the day of the resignation of the bishopric of Dunblane by Robert Lauder at the papal curia – 12 September 1466 – Pope Paul II provided Herspolz/Hepburn as Lauder's successor.

There remains a dispute as to who this person was. Balfour Paul, Lord Lyon King of Arms, who had full access to the national archives (where his office and court were located) stated categorically that his name was John Hepburn and that he was a son of Sir Adam Hepburn of Hailes, Knt., (d.1446) by his wife Janet, daughter of Sir William Borthwick of that Ilk, Knt (died before March 1450).

Cockburn's 1959 work engages in some guess-work, saying his name was Herpolz and suggests that he was not Scottish, perhaps being a papal courtier opportunistically rewarded after Lauder's resignation. Certainly there is no mention whatsoever in Scottish Supplications to Rome of either surname between 1433 and 1471 which could be regarded as odd. King James III of Scotland, presumably unaware of the Pope's actions, selected and nominated the Dean of Brechin, John Spalding, as the new bishop sometime in late 1466 or in 1467; this certainly occurred before 19 November 1467. Herspolz/Hepburn was nevertheless consecrated as bishop sometime between 22 June and 28 September 1467. It seems possible that the transcription of the old script here could be wanting.

Herspolz/Hepburn held the bishopric for two decades, dying sometime between his last occurrence in the sources on 3 February 1485 and the first mention of his successor's provision on 31 January 1487; it is extremely likely that he died in 1486.

== Notes ==
Religious titles
Preceded by Robert Lauder	Bishop of Dunblane; 1466–1485 × 1487	Succeeded by James Chisholm
