= Richard de Pontefract =

English Dominican friar

Richard de Pontefract O. P. (fl. 1320) was an English Dominican friar active during the reign King Edward II. On 25 June 1320, King Edward petitioned the papacy for Richard to fill the see of Dunblane, vacant by the death of Nicholas de Balmyle. Although King Edward probably did not expect to have much luck due to the circumstances of Wars of Scottish Independence, he claimed the right of patronage to Scottish sees. The vacant bishopric was eventually filled by Maurice, the Abbot of Inchaffray.
