= Prior of Inchmahome =

The Prior of Inchmahome (later, Commendator of Inchmahome) was the head of the community of Augustinian canons at Inchmahome Priory, on Inchmahome in the Lake of Menteith, in Highland Stirlingshire, Scotland. The following is a list of priors and commendators:

== List of priors ==
- Adam, fl 1296
- Maurice, 1297 x 1309
- Cristin, x 1309–1319 x
- A century of unknown priors
- Patrick de Port, x 1419
- Patrick de Cardross 1419/21–1445
- Thomas de Arbroath, 1419–1420
- Maurice de Cardross, 1445
- Gilbert de Camera, 1450–1468 x 1469
- David Noble, 1468
- Sir Thomas Dog, 1469–1477
- John Cavers, 1470–1473
- Alexander Ruch, 1474–1479
- Walter Drummond, 1477
- John Ruch, 1479

== List of commendators ==
- David Ballon (Henryson), 1479–1517
- Peter Mason, 1480
- John Edmonston, 1481
- Patrick Mentcher, 1492
- Andrew Ballon, 1517–1529
- Robert Erskine, 1529–1537
- John Erskine, 1537–1556
- David Erskine, 1556–1605
- Henry Stewart, 1584

== Bibliography ==
- Cowan, Ian B. & Easson, David E., Medieval Religious Houses: Scotland With an Appendix on the Houses in the Isle of Man, Second edition, (London, 1976), pp. 91–2
- Watt, D. E. R. & Shead, N. F. (eds.), The Heads of Religious Houses in Scotland from the 12th to the 16th Centuries, The Scottish Records Society, New Series, Volume 24, (Edinburgh, 2001), pp. 108–11

== See also ==
- Inchmahome Priory
