= William de Cambuslang =

Scottish churchman

- Bishop of Dunblane
- Church: Roman Catholic Church
- See: Diocese of Dunblane
- In office: 1347–1361
- Predecessor: Maurice
- Successor: Walter de Coventre
- Previous post(s): Canon of Dunblane

Orders
- Consecration: 23 October 1347

Personal details
- Born: late 13th century/early 14th century Perhaps Cambuslang, Clydesdale
- Died: 1361; Dunblane (?), Strathearn, Scotland

William de Cambuslang (died 1361) was a 14th-century Scottish churchman, presumably coming from a family based at or originating from Cambuslang near Glasgow.

The first clear notice of his existence comes from his papal letter of provision to the bishopric of Dunblane dated 23 October 1347; in the letter Pope Clement VI complained about the election of William being made despite an earlier papal reservation of the see; Pope Clement declared the election null and void, before himself providing William to the see directly, ordering him to be consecrated by Cardinal John, Bishop of Porto. The same letter said that William had previously been a canon of the cathedral chapter of Dunblane.

As Bishop of Dunblane, William witnessed at least six charters that are extant. He was sent, along with three other bishops, on a diplomatic mission to England in early 1351 relating to a temporary release of the imprisoned Scottish king David II; he and the bishops of St Andrews, Aberdeen and Brechin met English officials at Hexham. He was involved in another embassy in the summer, an embassy which met their English counterparts at Newcastle-upon-Tyne.

He last occurs in contemporary sources in a charter of Inchaffray Abbey dated 11 April 1358. A 16th-century insertion in the Donibristle manuscript of Walter Bower's Scotichronicon stated that he died on 1 November 1361; this cannot be correct however, as contemporary sources testify that he had already died by 18 June, but the year is nevertheless probably reliable. The same 16th century insertion is the only source for his surname, de Cambuslang.

== Notes ==
Religious titles
Preceded by Maurice	Bishop of Dunblane; 1347–1361	Succeeded by Walter de Coventre
