= William Stephani =

Scottish Christian bishop (fl. 1420s)

William Stephen, sometimes William Stephani (probably Stephenson), was a medieval prelate based in Scotland, who became Bishop of Orkney and then Bishop of Dunblane. A reader in divinity at the University of St Andrews at its first establishment, he was provided by Avignon Pope Benedict XIII as Bishop of Orkney 15 November 1415. He was a canon of Moray at this date. The consecration took place at the Papal court.

Despite having his provision confirmed by Pope Martin V on 15 July 1419, he does not seem to have gotten possession of fruits by the time he was translated to the bishopric of Dunblane on 30 October 1419. He was elected as conservator of the provincial synod of the Scottish church held at Perth on 16 July 1420. On 28 October 1420 he witnessed as charter of Murdoch Stewart, Duke of Albany. He was an auditor and receiver of the ransom of King James I of Scotland in 1424. He was sent as an ambassador to Rome by the king in 1425.

He is last attested in 1428, and he died sometime before 25 February 1429. The next bishop of Dunblane was Michael de Ochiltree.

== Sources ==
- Cockburn, James Hutchison, The Medieval Bishops of Dunblane and Their Church, (Edinburgh, 1959)
- Dowden, John, The Bishops of Scotland, ed. J. Maitland Thomson, (Glasgow, 1912)
- Keith, Robert, An Historical Catalogue of the Scottish Bishops: Down to the Year 1688, (London, 1924)
- Watt, D. E. R., Fasti Ecclesiae Scotinanae Medii Aevi ad annum 1638, 2nd Draft, (St Andrews, 1969)

Religious titles
Preceded by Alexander Vaus	Bishop of Orkney; 1415–1419	Succeeded by Thomas Tulloch
Preceded by Fionnlagh mac Cailein	Bishop of Dunblane; 1419–1428 x 1429	Succeeded by Michael Ochiltree
