= Inchmahome =

Coordinates: 56°10′34″N 4°17′49″W

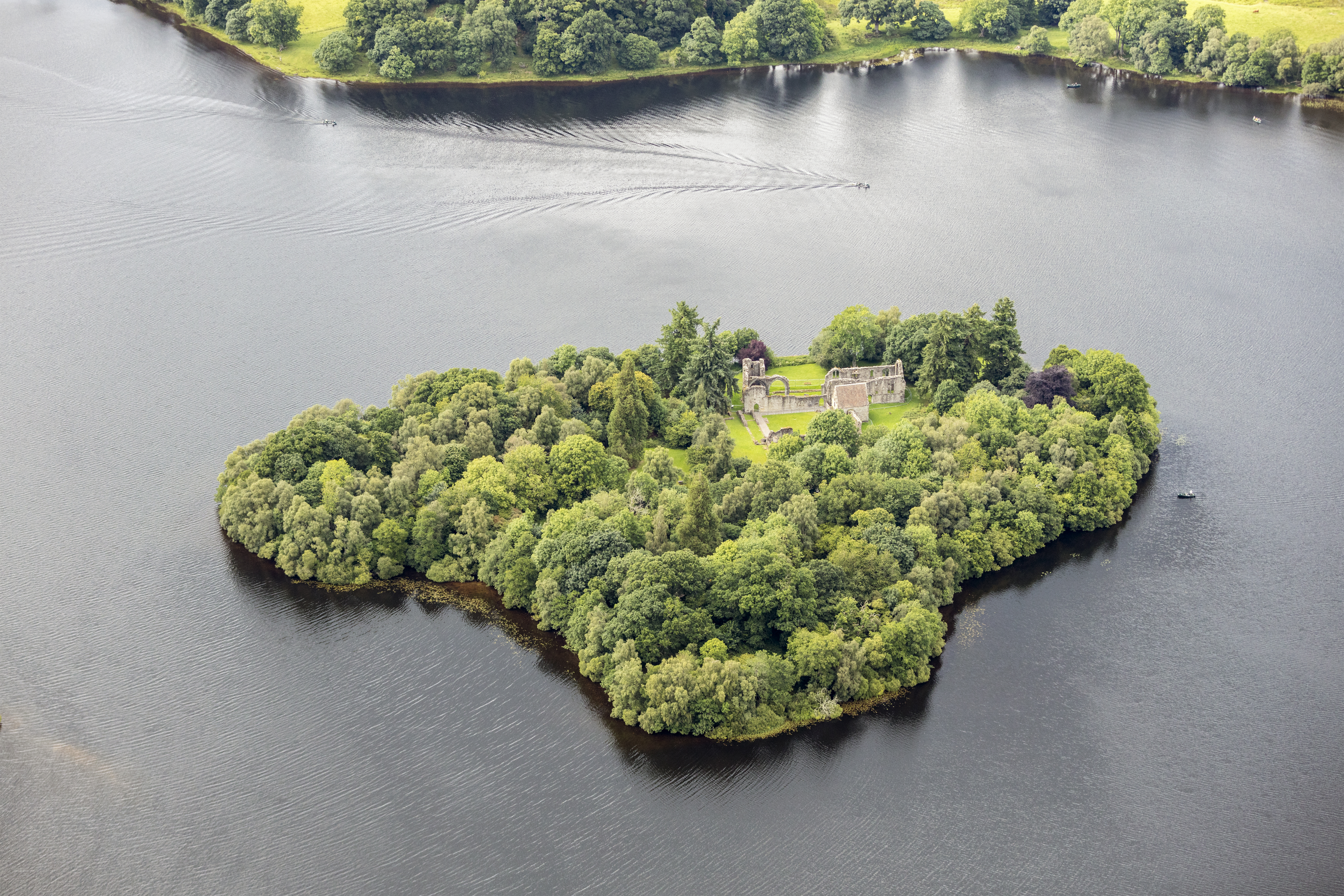
Inchmahome island and Priory

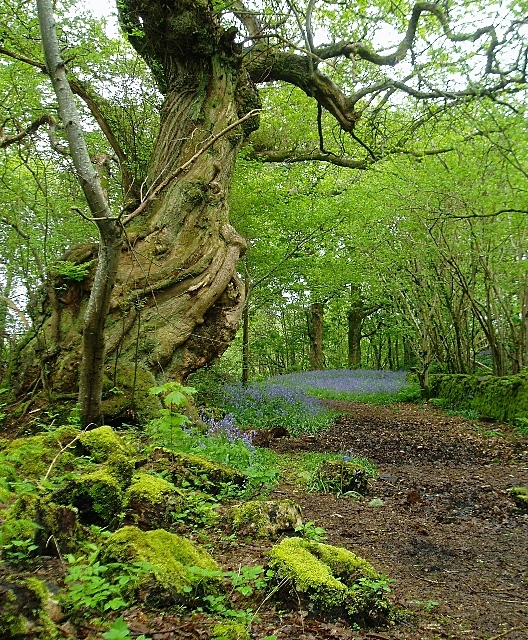
Ancient woodland on Inchmahome

Inchmahome, an anglicisation of Innis Mo Cholmaig ("my-Colmac's island"), is the largest of three islands in the Lake of Menteith, in Stirlingshire.

== History ==
Inchmahome is best known as the location of Inchmahome Priory and for the attendant priors of Inchmahome.

The priory was founded in 1238 by the Earl of Menteith, Walter Comyn, for a small community of the Augustinian order (the Black Canons). The Comyn family were one of the most powerful in Scotland at the time, and had an imposing country house on Inch Talla, one of the other islands on the lake. There is some evidence that there was a church on the island before the priory was established.

The priory has a long history of receiving many notable guests. King Robert the Bruce visited three times, in 1306, 1308 and 1310. His visits were likely politically motivated, as the first abbot had sworn allegiance to Edward I, the English King. In 1358 the future King Robert II also stayed at the priory. In 1547 the priory served as a refuge for Mary, Queen of Scots, aged four, hidden here for a few weeks following the disastrous defeat of the Scots army at the Battle of Pinkie Cleugh during the Rough Wooing.

The famous English travel writer, H.V. Morton, visited in the 1930s and wrote:

Far in the middle of the lake was a low greyness that rose and fell in queer shadows, as though the once holy isle of Inchmahome was built up out of lake water like a mirage.

This little island is one of Scotland's shrines; it was here that we can think of Mary Queen of Scots living, for once, happy hour in that first garden of her simpleness.

On Inchmahome, she was hidden when the English were hammering at the gates of Stirling... Legend has labelled every yard of Inchmahome. There are the 'Queen's Bower', the 'Queen's Tree', and the 'Queen's Chamber'.

Although Mary, Queen of Scots, was only on the island for a matter of weeks, at the age of five, fanciful stories have grown up around her on the island. For example, they state that it was here that she started to learn languages, held a mock court with the Four Marys, planted a box hedge and did needle work. A contemporary charter in Mary's name indicates that she was accompanied by her council, narrating that after "the field of Pynkyn Clewiche, quhen we wer transportit furtht of our castell of Streviling to the Isle of Inchemaquhomo by our dearest moder oure tutour and governour and lordis of oure counsall beyng then in the same Isle".

== See also ==
- List of islands of Scotland
