= Fionnlagh MacCailein =

Scottish bishop

- Bishop of Dunblane
- Church: Roman Catholic Church
- See: Diocese of Dunblane
- In office: 1403–1419
- Predecessor: Dúghall de Lorne
- Successor: William Stephani
- Previous post: Archdeacon of Dunblane (1400 × 1402–1403)

Orders
- Consecration: 10 September 1403 × 28 April 1404

Personal details
- Born: unknown unknown
- Died: 1419

Fionnlagh MacCailein or Finlay Colini (died 1419) was a medieval Scottish bishop. Both his early life and the details of his career as Bishop of Dunblane are not well known, however it is known that he held the latter bishopric between 1403 and his death in 1419. He was part of the circle of Robert Stewart, Duke of Albany, and was one of the many clerics from west and central Gaelic-speaking Scotland who benefited from the latter's patronage. He is said to have authorised the construction of the first bridge over the river Allan at Dunblane.

== Biography ==
=== Background and early life ===
It was said by John Spottiswood that his surname was "Dermoch", but that is not corroborated by contemporary sources and is probably a mistake. His last name appears in contemporary Latin sources as Colini, representing MacCailein, meaning "son of Cailean"; it may mean that Cailean was the name of his father, but if it was a surname it probably means he was a Campbell, a family also known at the time as MacCailein, believing as they did that they were descended from one Cailean Mór.

He held a bachelor's degree in canon law by 13 December 1400. On 15 September 1402 Pope Benedict XIII provided Fionnlagh to a canonry (with the expectation of a prebend) in the diocese of Dunkeld; the mandate of provision contains information much about Fionnlagh, informing us that he was a priest, confirming that he possessed a bachelor's degree in canon law, while also stating that he was Archdeacon of Dunblane.

He was said in the papal document to have held the hospital of Uthrogle and "a certain perpetual office or benefice without cure in the secular collegiate church of Abernethy"; the latter, we know from another papal source, was the lectorship of Abernethy called "ferlinn", i.e. fer léighinn (literally "man of letters"), a position which existed at Abernethy collegiate church into the 16th century.

By this period he was the chaplain of Robert Stewart, Duke of Albany. The patronage of the Duke of Albany, who importantly was also Earl of Menteith, was crucial to Fionnlagh's whole career; Fionnlagh's bishop at Dunblane was Dúghall de Lorne, another Albany man. Albany indeed petitioned for benefices of Fionnlagh's behalf, and all of the benefices Fionnlagh held lay within Albany's influence.

=== Bishop of Dunblane ===
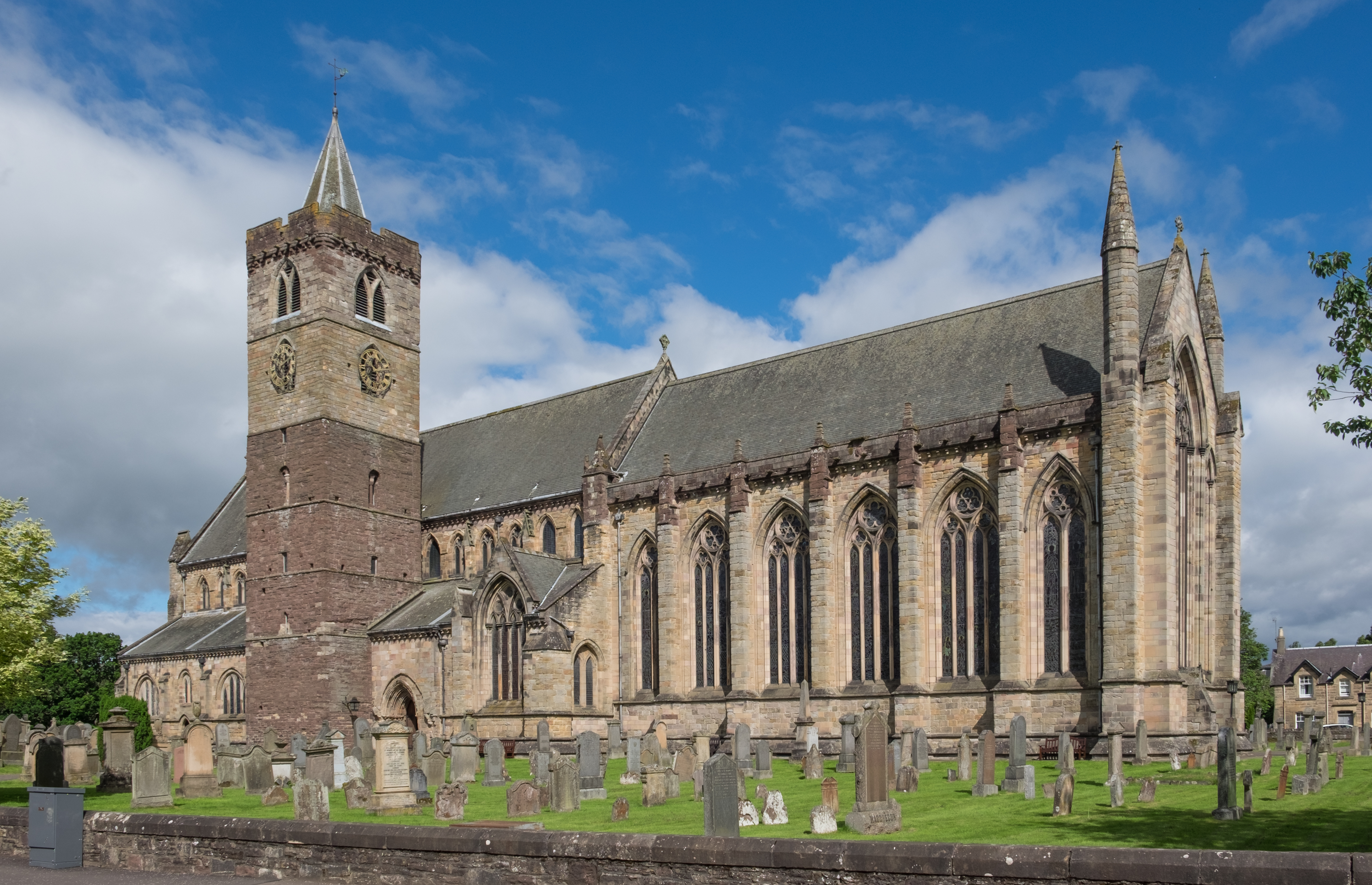
Dunblane Cathedral, seat (cathedra) of the Bishop of Dunblane.

Some time after the death of Bishop Dúghall (last attested 1398 × 1401), Fionnlagh was elected as Bishop of Dunblane; on 10 September 1403, Fionnlagh was provided to the bishopric by the Pope directly, the election being illegal due - so it was claimed - to earlier papal reservation of the see. His unattested consecration, which was probably performed at the papal see, had certainly occurred by 28 April 1404.

At that date he is found back in Scotland as a full bishop attending a church council at Linlithgow. His activities and whereabouts as Bishop of Dunblane are not well attested. In 1404 the Pope mandated Fionnlagh as well as Henry de Wardlaw, Bishop of St Andrews, and Robert de Cardeny, the Bishop of Dunkeld, to preach a crusade against the Turks. He was at Dunblane on 29 November 1406, witnessing a charter of the Duke of Albany; he is next found on 18 July 1408, at a church council of the church held at Perth, and then again on 28 October that year witnessing another charter of the Duke of Albany.

In 1411 Bishop Fionnlagh and two others were authorised by the papacy to use the income from the vacant diocese of Argyll to repair Lismore Cathedral, the seat of that bishopric. He is mentioned in a papal mandate issued to John, Abbot of Balmerino on 1 June 1414; John was a papal nuncio and collector in Scotland, and the mandate ordered him to offer his oath of fealty to the papacy through Bishop Fionnlagh; it is of note that Abbot John had once served as Fionnlagh's proctor at the papal curia.

The resignation of the earldom of Ross by Euphemia II, Countess of Ross, to the Duke of Albany on 12 June 1415 (probably at Stirling) was witnessed by Bishop Fionnlagh. He is found again on 17 March 1416 at a general council of the church held at Perth.

He is last known to have been alive on 25 March 1419 but was dead by 30 October when a papal mandate ordered the translation of William Stephani, Bishop of Orkney, to the now vacant see of Dunblane. The chronicler Walter Bower, writing a few decades after Fionnlagh's death, claimed that Bishop Fionnlagh was responsible for the building of a bridge over the river Allan at Dunblane.

== Notes ==
Religious titles
Preceded by Maurice de Strathearn	Archdeacon of Dunblane; 1400 × 1402–1403	Succeeded by Thomas Graham
Preceded by Dúghall de Lorne	Bishop of Dunblane; 1403–1419	Succeeded by William Stephani
