= Michael Ochiltree =

Scottish prelate and administrator

- Bishop of Dunblane
- Church: Roman Catholic Church
- See: Diocese of Dunblane
- In office: 1429–1446 x 1447
- Predecessor: William Stephani
- Successor: Robert Lauder
- Previous post(s): Dean of Dunblane

Orders
- Consecration: 1430 x 1431

Personal details
- Born: Probably late 14th century Probably Ochiltree, East Ayrshire
- Died: 1446 x 1447; Dunblane (?), Strathearn, Scotland

Michael Ochiltree [Ouchtre] (d. 1445 x 1447) was a 15th-century Scottish prelate and administrator. A close associate of King James I of Scotland, from the late 1410s he rose in rank from canon to Dean of Dunblane and then Bishop of Dunblane. Ochiltree was responsible for the coronation of King James II of Scotland, and he obtained a grant from the crown which allowed the comparatively small diocese of Dunblane to attain historically unprecedented viability.

== Biography ==
=== Early life ===
He probably came from Ochiltree in East Ayrshire; according to one source, he was the son of a priest and an unmarried woman, though this is contradicted by another source that claims he was the son of a married man and an unmarried woman; he was however certainly regarded as illegitimate, and later had to gain a dispensation for his illegitimacy. As a young man, Ochiltree obtained a Bachelorate in Canon Law from the University of Paris. He became a canon of the diocese of Dunblane and held the vicarage of Strogeith by 1418.

=== Early career ===
Ochiltree was involved in a long dispute at the Papal curia over the deanery of Dunblane; his opponents were John Stewart and then John de Keremor. Bishop William Stephani had appointed Ochiltree as dean following the death of the previous dean, probably Donald de Bute; however, the pope appointed John Stewart, M.A., B.L., who was rector of the parish of Flysk and bastard son of King Robert II of Scotland.

Litigation proceeded at Rome. John gave up his claim after 22 September 1421; but, according to the reconstruction of James Hutchison Cockburn, rumours that Ochiltree had been appointed Bishop of the Isles (Sodor) led to John de Keremor petitioning for the vacant deanery. This confusion was apparently produced when a Michael Anchire, priest of the Archdiocese of Dublin, was provided to the see of Sodor. Even if Cockburn is wrong, Keremor was definitely unsuccessful, and Ochiltree retained the deanery.

In 1425 Ochiltree became rector of the church of Inchmagranach in the diocese of Dunkeld, as well as holding the three-year vicarage of Tibbermore, also in Dunkeld. When this three years finished, he became rector of Lilliesleaf in the diocese of Glasgow. However, he surrendered his benefices when, on 22 June 1429, he was provided as Bishop of Dunblane.

=== Bishop of Dunblane ===
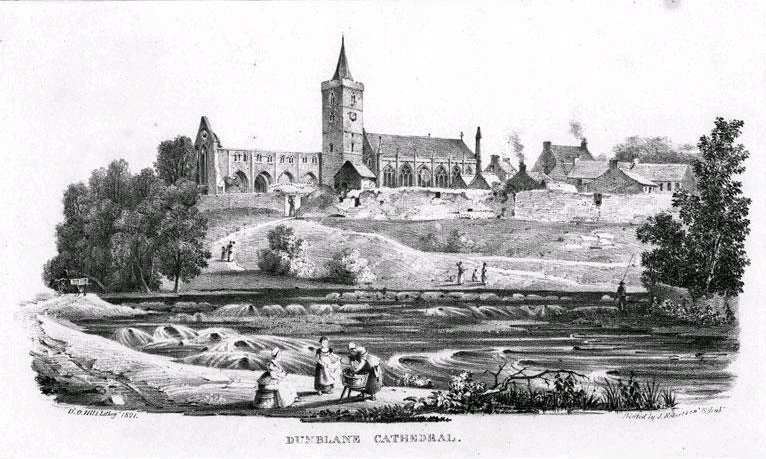
A chalk lithographic sketch of Dunblane Cathedral published in 1821, a half century before the reconstruction of the cathedral.

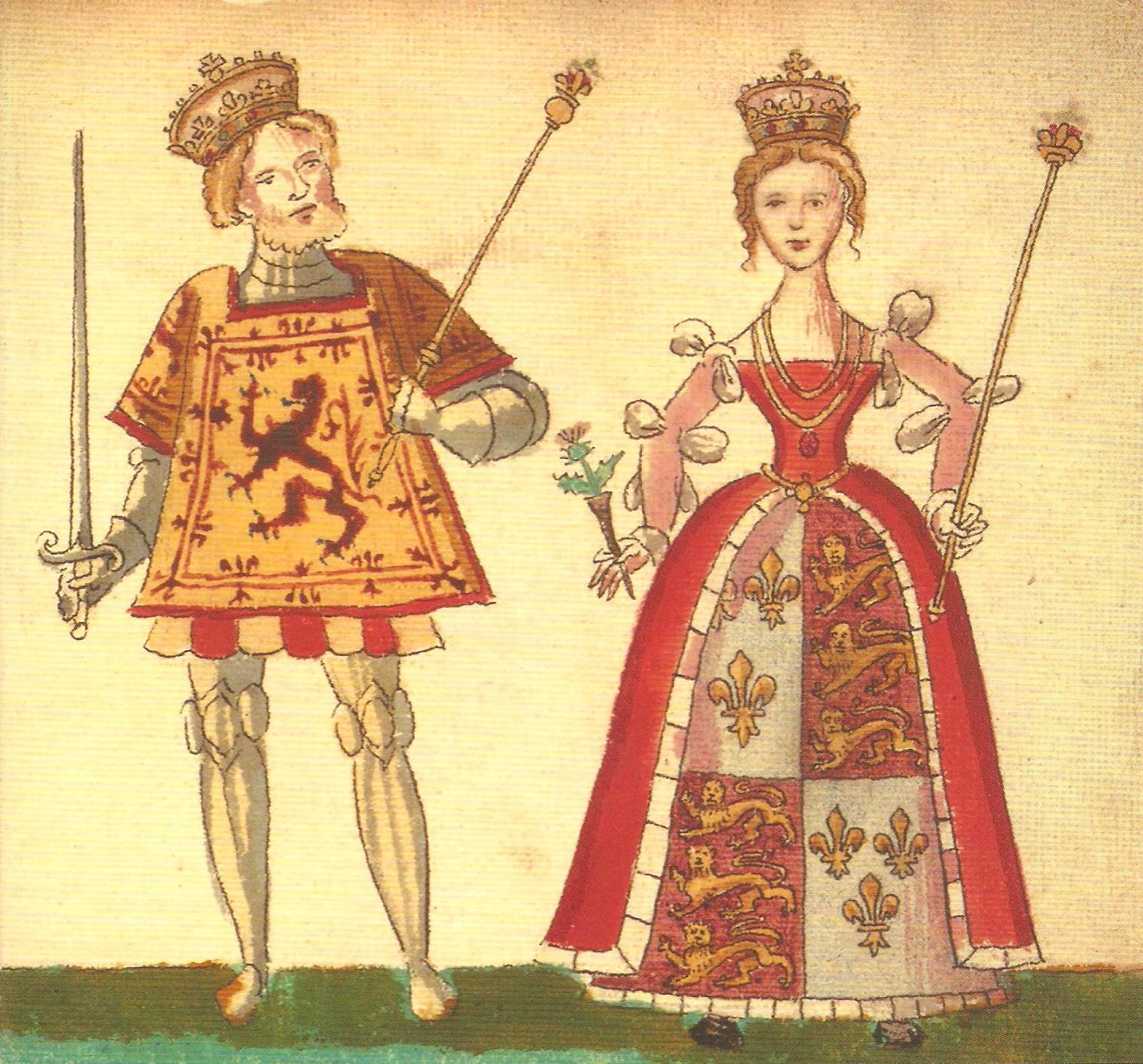
James I and Joan Beaufort.

Ochiltree's consecration did not take place immediately. As part of a large group of ambassadors including John Cameron, Bishop of Glasgow and Henry de Lichton, Bishop of Aberdeen, he was sent to England in January 1430 in order to secure peaceful relations while King James dealt with troublesome vassals within his own kingdom. Ochiltree was finally consecrated some time between July 1430 and April 1431.

After the assassination of King James I of Scotland at Perth on 21 February 1437, a rushed coronation took place for his seven-year-old son, who became King James II of Scotland. The coronation had to be done at Holyrood Abbey because Scone, the traditional coronation site, was too dangerous. In these circumstances, Bishop Ochiltree conducted the ceremony of anointment, a role usually reserved for a higher ranking bishop.

Ochiltree's greatest accomplishment transpired in 1442. In this year he persuaded the government of James II to grant the bishopric of Dunblane large tracts taken from the earldom of Strathearn, in royal hands since the execution of its last earl, Walter Stewart, in 1437. This land was conferred with extensive rights, the bishopric became a regality, and the town of Dunblane itself was elevated from an episcopal burgh to a burgh of barony. As Cockburn put it, "For the first time in its history the Cathedral of Dunblane had the promise of sufficient revenue".

=== Michael Ochiltree and the crown ===
Ochiltree's career rise and the success of his episcopate were due, in large part, to the relationship he had with the Scottish royal family. He had been an "intimate friend" of King Robert III of Scotland and his wife Anabella Drummond, and then James I and his wife Joan Beaufort. Indeed, Ochiltree, despite his relatively low birth, had been brought up at the royal court. King James I called him "the familiar, the domestic and commensal of himself, his father and his mother". He spent a good period of time as Almoner-General to James I. His relationship with Queen Joan seems to have been particularly valuable, and it was probably her influence that led to the grant of 1442.

=== Death ===
Bishop Michael appears in the sources for the last time on 23 September 1446, witnessing a charter at Perth. His successor(s) as bishop had been elected and provided sometime before 27 October 1447, meaning that the date of his death fell between these two dates. As well as the 1442 grant, he is remembered as having built the "Bishop's Bridge" between Ardoch and Muthill, and to have reconstituted the church at the latter location. He is also remembered for his frequent attendance at parliament, for which he was, among other things, an auditor of accounts. Cockburn, minister and historian, asserted that "Since Clement, no Bishop of Dunblane had occupied the See with such comprehensive competence as Michael".

== Notes ==
Religious titles
Preceded by Donald de Bute	Dean of Dunblane; 1419 x 1420–1429	Succeeded by Robert de Crannach
Preceded by William Stephani	Bishop of Dunblane; 1429–1446 x 1447	Succeeded by Walter Stewart (unconsecrated); Robert Lauder
