= Archdeacon of Dunblane =

The Archdeacon of Dunblane was the only archdeacon in the Diocese of Dunblane, acting as a deputy of the Bishop of Dunblane. The first archdeacon, Andrew (Aindréas), was called "Archdeacon of Modhel" (Muthill); archdeacons Jonathan, Gilbert and Luke were styled "Archdeacon of Dunblane", while John and Duncan were called "Archdeacon of Strathearn". It is only from Augustine of Nottingham that the title settles at "of Dunblane". The following is a list of archdeacons:

== List of archdeacons ==
- Andrew, fl. 1165 x 1171
- Jonathan, fl. 1178 x 1197-x 1198
- John, x 1199-1203 x 1210
- Gilbert (Gille Brighde), x 1210-1235
- Luke de Muthill, 1239-1240
- Duncan (Donnchadh), fl. 1240 x 1255
- Augustine of Nottingham, fl. 1268-1283
- Walter of Montrose, 1287-1296
- William of Yetholm, fl. 1309 x 1313-1320 x 1321
- Thomas, fl. 1322 x 1328
- Walter de Coventry, fl. 1345
- Nicholas de Kinbuck, fl. 1358-1360
- Andrew Magnus, x 1365-1372
- David Bell, 1375-1377
- Maurice of Strathearn, 1377-1398
- Fionnlagh MacCailein, 1400 x 1402-1403
- Thomas Graham, 1410 x 1411-1414 x 1419
- Walter Stewart, x 1433-1456 x
- Andrew Purves, x 1474-1479 x 1480
  - Alexander Rate x 1474-1479 x 1480
  - William Scheves, 1474
- Duncan Bulle, 1480-1490
- Henry Allan, 1492-1504
- John Doby, 1506-1513
- Patrick Blackadder, d. 1519
- George Newton, 1521-1531 x 1533
- John Chisholm, 1531-1542
- John Danielston, 1542-1545
- William Gordon, 1545
- John Thornton, 1545
- George Wawane, x 1550-1558 x 1564
- James Chisholm, 1566-1595
- Patrick Stirling, 1606-1607
- Alexander Gaw, 1610-1615
- John Fife, 1616-1633
- William Bannatyne, 1635

== Bibliography ==
- Watt, D.E.R., Fasti Ecclesiae Scotinanae Medii Aevi ad annum 1638, 2nd Draft, (St Andrews, 1969), pp. 88–91

== See also ==
- Bishop of Dunblane
