= Inchmahome Priory =

Priory in Stirling, Scotland

Coordinates: 56°10′34″N 4°17′52″W

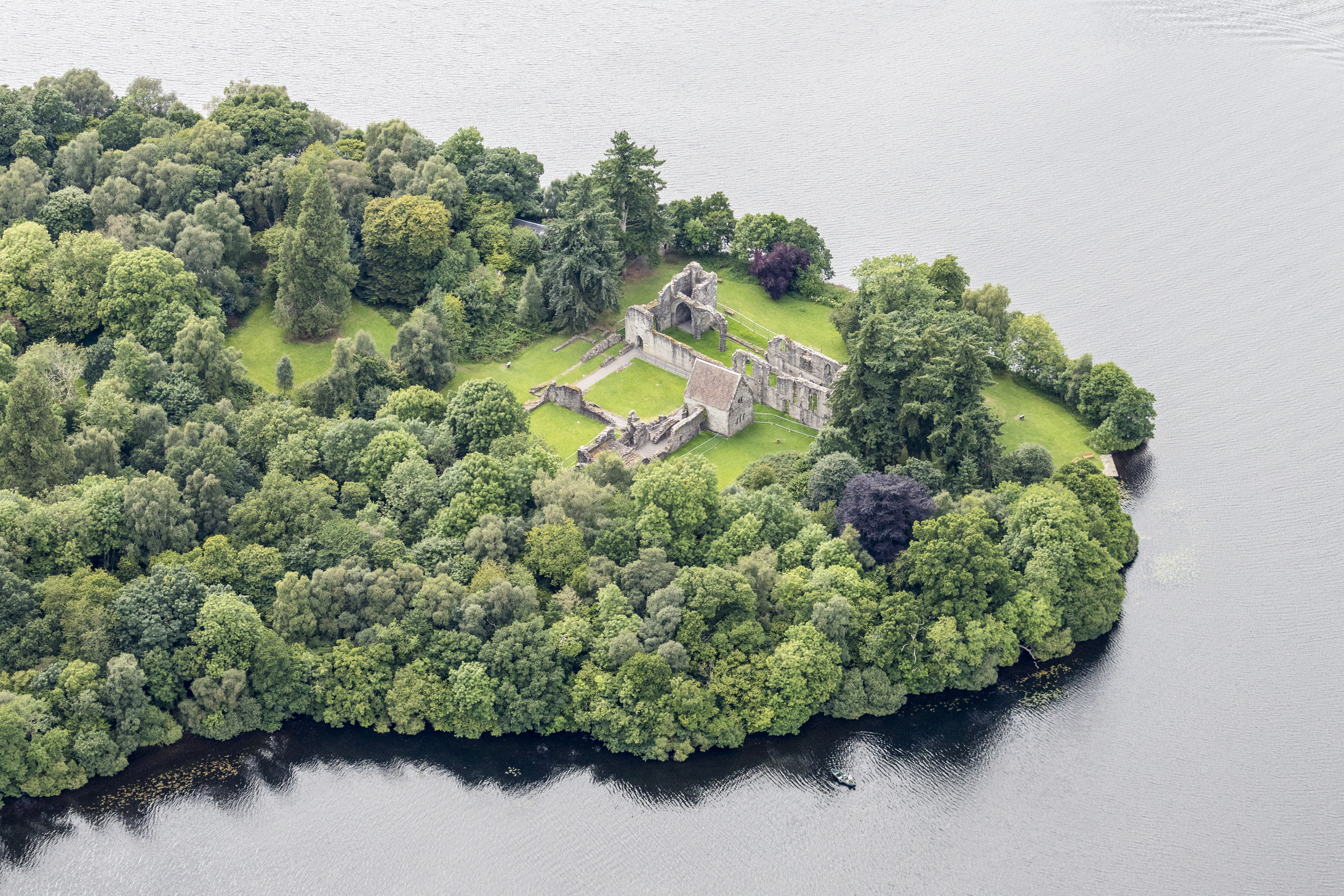
- Abbey ruins
- Interactive map of Inchmahome Priory

Monastery information
- Established: 1238

People
- Founders: Earl of Menteith, Walter Comyn

Scheduled monument
- Official name: Inchmahome Priory
- Type: Ecclesiastical: priory
- Designated: 31 December 1921
- Reference no.: SM90169

Inventory of Gardens and Designed Landscapes in Scotland
- Official name: Inchmahome Priory
- Designated: 31 March 2007
- Reference no.: GDL00218

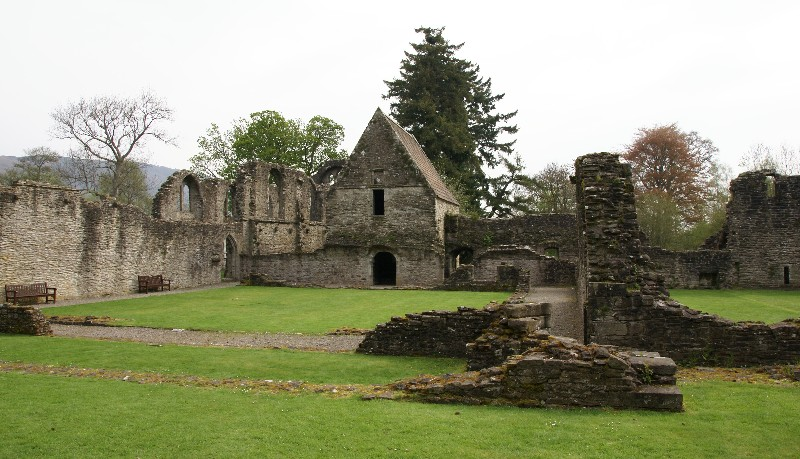
Inchmahome Priory

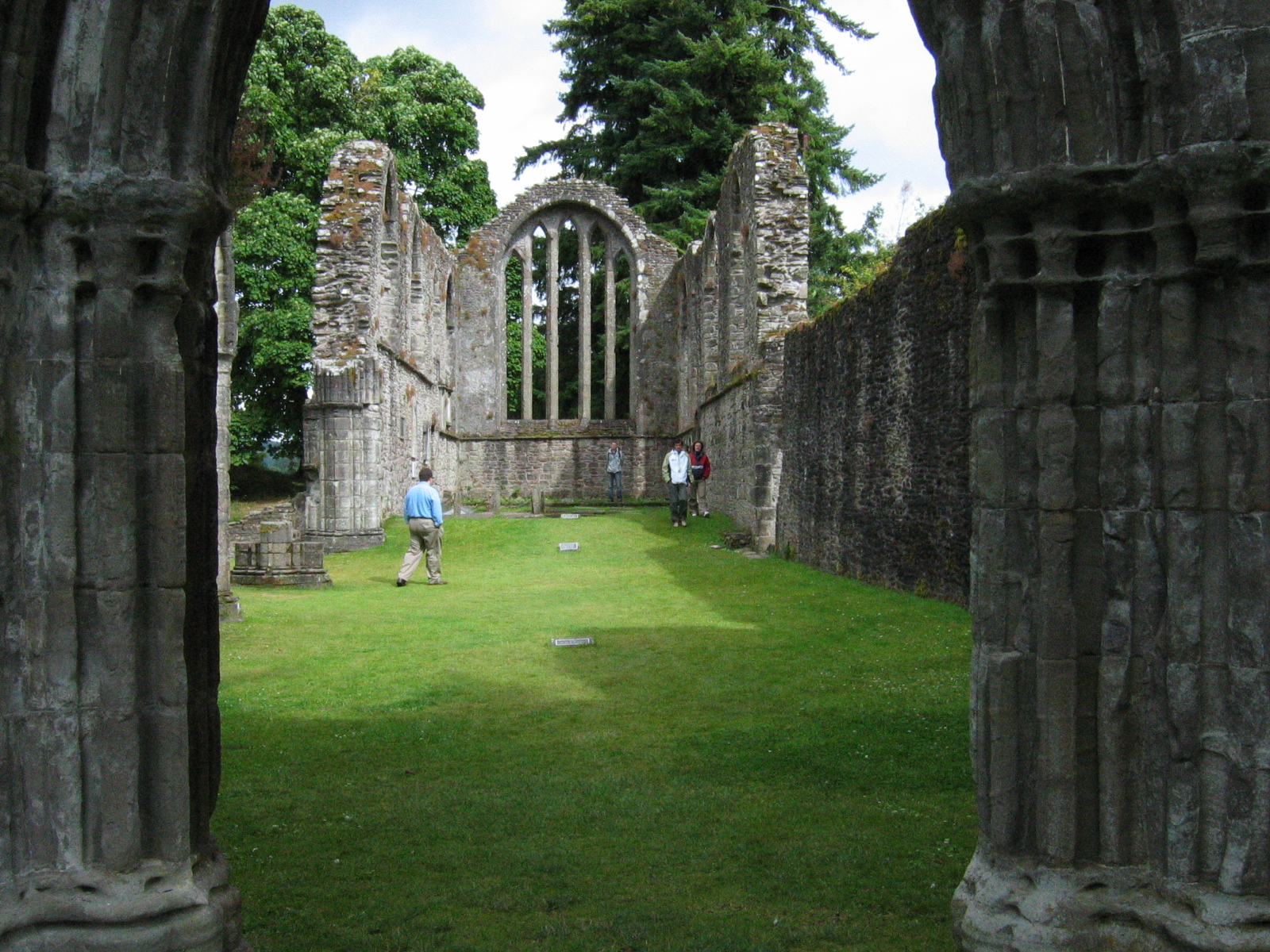
Inchmahome Priory

Inchmahome Priory is situated on Inchmahome, the largest of three islands in the centre of the Lake of Menteith, close to Aberfoyle, Scotland.

The name "Inchmahome" comes from the Gaelic Innis MoCholmaig, meaning island of St Colmaig.

The priory was founded in 1238 by the Earl of Menteith, Walter Comyn, for a small group of members of the Augustinian order (the Black Canons). The Comyn family were one of the most powerful in Scotland at the time, and had an imposing country house on Inch Talla, one of the other islands on the Lake of Menteith. There is some evidence that there had been a church on the island before the priory was established.

The priory received many notable guests throughout its history. King Robert the Bruce visited three times: in 1306, 1308 and 1310. His visits were likely politically motivated, as the first prior had sworn allegiance to Edward I, the English king. In 1358, the future King Robert II stayed at the priory. In 1547, the priory served as a refuge for Queen Mary, aged four, hidden there for a few weeks following the disastrous defeat of the Scots army at the Battle of Pinkie during the Rough Wooing.

The decline of the monastic orders in the 16th century was hastened when the heads of the abbeys and priories started being appointed by local landowners, who often did not share the religious goals of the monks or ordained priests. In 1547, the office passed to John, Lord Erskine, who later became head of Cambuskenneth and Dryburgh abbeys. After the Scottish Reformation, no new priests were ordained, and religious land and buildings gradually passed into secular hands, inevitably leading to the priory's decline. In 1606, the land and property passed to the Erskine family, and later to the Marquess of Montrose; the 6th Duke of Montrose transferred it into the care of the State in 1926.

The author, socialist and nationalist politician Robert Bontine Cunninghame Graham and his wife Gabriela Cunninghame Graham are buried in the ruined chancel of the priory, where there is also a stone commemorating his nephew and heir, Admiral A.E.M.B. Cunninghame Graham.

Although most of the buildings are now ruins, much of the original 13th-century structure remains, and it is now in the care of Historic Environment Scotland, who maintain and preserve it as a scheduled monument.

The priory can be visited by a boat that is operated between March and September by Historic Environment Scotland, which departs from the nearby pier at the Port of Menteith.

== Burials ==
- Walter Bailloch
- Mary I, Countess of Menteith

== See also ==
- Prior of Inchmahome, for a list of priors and commendators
- Scheduled monuments in Stirling
