= Robert Lauder =

Scottish prelate

- Bishop of Dunblane
- Church: Roman Catholic Church
- See: Diocese of Dunblane
- In office: 1447–1466
- Predecessor: Michael Ochiltree
- Successor: John Herspolz
- Previous post(s): Dean of Dunkeld; Vicar of Selkirk

Orders
- Consecration: 27 October x 13 November 1447

Personal details
- Born: UNKNOWN; Scotland
- Died: UNKNOWN; Probably Scotland

Robert Lauder was a Scottish prelate and Nuncio of the 15th century. The Lauder family produced a large number of senior churchman in this period, and alongside Robert can be named William Lauder, Bishop of Glasgow, Alexander Lauder and Thomas Lauder, both Bishop of Dunkeld, and George Lauder, Bishop of Argyll.

Almost nothing is known of Robert Lauder, other than his status "of baronial race" and a "kinsman to sundry barons", until he supplicated the Pope, on 5 December 1429, to provide him to the vicarage of Inverkeilor. He was then provided, by John Foster, Chaplain of Honour of the Pope and Apostolic See, with the canonry and prebend of 'Castelcaris' in Glasgow, but this appointment was disputed after Forster's death, by Supplication dated 6 March 1430. This Supplication appears to have failed as Lauder was still in post at Glasgow on 18 January 1434 when a dispute arose over the vicarage of Stitchell. In January 1437 he was present at the Curia with personal requests to the Pope. On 16 February 1437, described as "Canon of Glasgow", he petitioned the Pope for a licence to choose a confessor.

Robert Lauder, Canon of Glasgow, designated "nuncio of the King of Scots to the Pope", was in the Curia on 1 September 1440 when he asked for the post of Precentor of Glasgow to be awarded to him while the case against the previous Precentor, David de Cadzow, another Canon, was considered. This failed to transpire. From then until January 1444 he was Rector of Cadzow which he then wished to resign because "some of the inhabitants of those parts were inimical towards him". He was still there in July 1444 when he was offered the vicarage of Earlston, although he was minded to take it. He resigned Cadzow on 25 November 1444 while he was once more at the Curia successfully arguing that he should be able to hold two parishes (or more) and their benefices at the same time.

He successfully Supplicated the Pope on 14 July 1445 for provision as Dean of Dunkeld at £45 per annum, but was no longer holding the position on 12 November, when John Clepham was provided to the position. Likewise, he was briefly precentor of Moray, his Supplication being dated 2 January 1447, but resigned sometime before 3 April.

He had also held the vicarage of Selkirk (or nearby Ashkirk) in the diocese of Glasgow, the rectory of which was transferred from Jedburgh Abbey to Kelso Abbey by Pope Eugene IV. This transaction led to a dispute between Robert and the Abbot of Kelso over the vicar's portion of the revenue, a dispute carried to the papacy in a Supplication dated 15 April 1447. Pope Eugene appointed a chaplain to deal with the issue, but Eugene died before anything was resolved, and the new pope Nicholas V appointed three clerics to deal with the issue, resolved in Spring of 1447. In Lauder's Supplication on this issue whilst a Canon of Glasgow, he had obtained the "perpetual vicarage" of Selkirk (£25 sterling pa) under an "expectative grace", also held the perpetual vicarage of Earlston (£8 sterling pa) and the canonry and prebendary of Cardross (£9 sterling pa) and had an annual "pension for life" of £6 on the "fruits" of the prebend of Barlanark. It is impossible that one priest could have fulfilled all these functions in parishes so distant from one another, an indication of the corruption within the Church before the Reformation.

On 27 October 1447, just six months later, he was provided by the Pope to the bishopric of Dunblane, incidentally voiding the resolution on the vicarage of Selkirk, as he resigned it and Earlston upon his promotion. On 13 November he is found paying or promising to pay the papacy 800 florins. He was consecrated sometime before this date. Over the New Year 1448-9 he was again at the Curia.

Three times between August and November 1449 he was a member of large embassages sent to England to negotiate a peace with its king, Henry VI.

A large number of documents are extant from his episcopate illustrating the workings of the bishopric's law courts and the bishop's governmental activities. He was a witness to the concession to the Scottish church made by King James II of Scotland in 1451 permitting the disposal of property by testament. He was present at the provincial council held at Perth on 18 July 1465.

He resigned the bishopric on 12 September 1466 and, with the agreement of his successor and the pope, was granted an annual pension for life of 300 gold florins. The date of his death is unknown.

== Notes ==
Religious titles
Preceded by John Stewart	Dean of Dunkeld; 1445	Succeeded by John Clepham
Preceded by Michael Ochiltree	Bishop of Dunblane; 1447–1466	Succeeded by John Herspolz
