= Holy Trinity Church, Spynie =

Former cathedral in Moray, Scotland

Coordinates: 57°40′22″N 3°17′43″W

Holy Trinity, Spynie
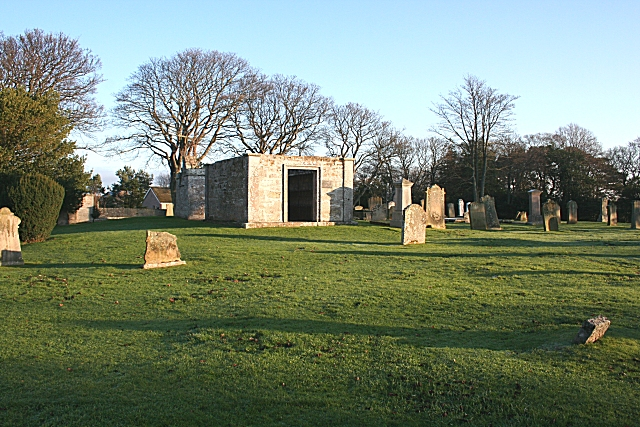
- The site of the church in the graveyard at Spynie
- Holy Trinity, Spynie
- Location: Spynie, Moray
- Country: Scotland
- Denomination: Catholic

History
- Founded: 1207
- Founder: Bishop Brice de Douglas
- Dedication: The Holy Trinity

Architecture
- Functional status: Ruin
- Architectural type: Cathedral

Administration
- Diocese: Moray

Holy Trinity Church, Spynie was until 1735 the parish church of Spynie, Moray in north-east Scotland, and served as the cathedral of the Diocese of Moray between 1207 and 1224.

No trace of the church can now be seen, but its graveyard remains near Spynie Palace, and its site is occupied by two burial vaults, with a cross marking the location of the church's eastern end. The graveyard is the burial place of former British Prime Minister Ramsay MacDonald.

== History ==
The church at Spynie dates back to the 12th century, and possibly earlier. The early Bishops of Moray had no fixed cathedral, moving between the churches of Spynie, Birnie and Kinneddar. Between 1172 and 1174 King William the Lion agreed with Bishop Simon de Tosny to grant all of his teinds from the Diocese of Moray "to the church of the Holy Trinity of the bishopric of Moray and to Lord Simon, Bishop of Moray". Bishop Simon reached a similar agreement with Freskin of Duffus Castle regarding the woods and mosses of Spynie and Findrassie, and Simon's agreement with the King was confirmed by his successor Richard de Lincoln in 1187 and 1199. Bishop Richard, however, adopted Kinneddar as his cathedral, and began to provide the see with a constitution.

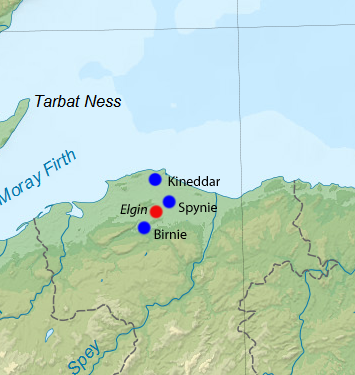
The early cathedrals of the Diocese of Moray

The cathedral of the see of Moray was moved from Kinneddar to Spynie by Bishop Richard's successor Bricius de Douglas as part of a radical reorganisation of the diocese. A papal bull was issued by Pope Innocent III in 1207 confirming Spynie as the seat of the cathedral and explaining that this decision had been taken on the advice of the "chapter and other wise laymen" on the basis that Spynie was conveniently placed for administering the diocese, but also not in a dangerously exposed location. A new constitution was introduced based on that of Lincoln Cathedral that established a small chapter of eight canons, including a dean, a precentor, a treasurer, a chancellor and an archdeacon.

It is not known how much progress had been made on building Bishop Bricius' cathedral at Spynie by the time of his death in 1222. On 19 July 1224, however, Bricius' successor Andreas de Moravia moved the seat of the diocese 3 kilometres (1.9 mi) to the south to Elgin, citing Spynie's exposure to the dangers of war, its isolation and the problems of supplying it with the needs of divine worship. The endowment for the fabric of the church at Spynie was also transferred to Elgin, but Spynie remained the parish church and a prebend of Elgin cathedral, and nearby Spynie Palace remained the principal residence of the Bishop.

The seat of the parish of Spynie was moved to New Spynie in 1745, with the new church being built in 1736 partly with stones taken from the old one. The last remaining part of the old church was a gothic gable which fell in 1850. The foundations were traced in 1924 and found to indicate a small church building of 23 metres (75 ft) by 10.5 metres (34 ft), with the structure apart from the eastern gable being built largely of clay in a simple style.

== Bibliography ==
- Butler, Dugald (2007). Scottish Cathedrals and Abbeys. BiblioLife. ISBN 978-1-110-89589-2.
- Dransart, Penelope (2016). "Bishops' Palaces in the Medieval Dioceses of Aberdeen and Moray". In Geddes, Jane (ed.). Medieval Art, Architecture and Archaeology in the Dioceses of Aberdeen and Moray. Routledge. pp. 58–81. ISBN 978-1317248071.
- Lewis, John; Pringle, Denys (2002). Spynie Palace and the bishops of Moray: history, architecture and archaeology. Edinburgh: Society of Antiquaries of Scotland. ISBN 9780903903219.
- Oram, Richard (2016). "The Medieval Church in the Dioceses of Aberdeen and Moray". In Geddes, Jane (ed.). Medieval Art, Architecture and Archaeology in the Dioceses of Aberdeen and Moray. Routledge. pp. 58–81. ISBN 978-1317248071.
