= Spynie =

Coordinates: 57°40′19″N 3°17′44″W

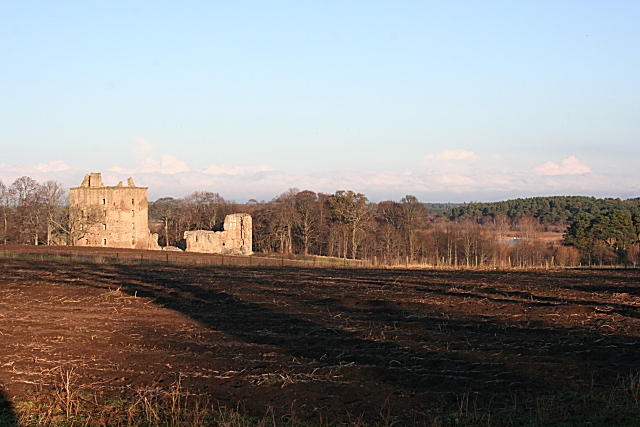
Spynie Palace and the remnants of the drained Loch Spynie, seen from the kirkyard of Holy Trinity Church, Spynie

Spynie was a seaport, burgh and ancient parish in Moray, Scotland, that survives as a small hamlet and civil parish. It is the location of the ruins of Spynie Palace, which was the principal residence of the Bishops of Moray between the 12th and 17th centuries, and the churchyard of Holy Trinity Church, Spynie, which served as the cathedral of the Diocese of Moray between 1207 and 1224.

== History ==
Large deposits of oyster and cockle shells in the area provide evidence of human habitation going back to the Neolithic period, and artefacts from Bronze Age occupation, including axes, pottery and shell deposits have been found on the site of the later settlement.

Spynie developed as a seaport on the south shore of Loch Spynie, a much larger body of water in the medieval period than the present day, and one that was open to the sea until the late 15th century. Holy Trinity Church was in existence by the 12th century and possibly earlier and was, alongside Birnie and Kinneddar, one of the early centres of the Bishops of Moray.

Bishop John de Pilmuir is recorded in the mid 14th century having deepened the channel between Spynie and the sea by sinking boats to change the flow of water. Later in the century Bishop Alexander Bur was forced to defend the rights of the port of Spynie against challenge from the Earl of Moray and burgesses of Elgin, making a "protestation" that for more than a century the bishops "had and were accustomed to have the fishers of sea fish living in the toun of Spynie with their wives and families, sailing from Spynie out to sea and bringing back their boats with fish through the same port".

In 1451 all of the lands belonging to the church in Moray were combined into the barony of Spynie. Spynie itself was erected into a burgh of barony on 4 July 1451, with its inhabitants having the right to conduct fishing, fishmongery, butchery and brewing, and hold a weekly market and an annual fair. In 1459 grain is recorded as being exported from Spynie to Leith.

The customs from the port were granted to the Earl of Moray in 1566, but the town was already in decline - the value of rentals in Spynie had declined from £10 per year in 1565 to £5 per year in 1574. The silting up of Loch Spynie removed Spynie's access to the sea, and by the end of the 17th century the town had disappeared.

== Bibliography ==
- Lewis, John; Pringle, Denys (2002). Spynie Palace and the Bishops of Moray: history, architecture and archaeology. Edinburgh: Society of Antiquaries of Scotland. ISBN 9780903903219.
- Ross, Alasdair (2015). Land assessment and lordship in medieval Northern Scotland. Turnhout: Brepols. p. 290. ISBN 9782503541334.
