= Kinneddar =

Castle in Scotland, United Kingdom

Coordinates: 57.7103°N 3.3034°W

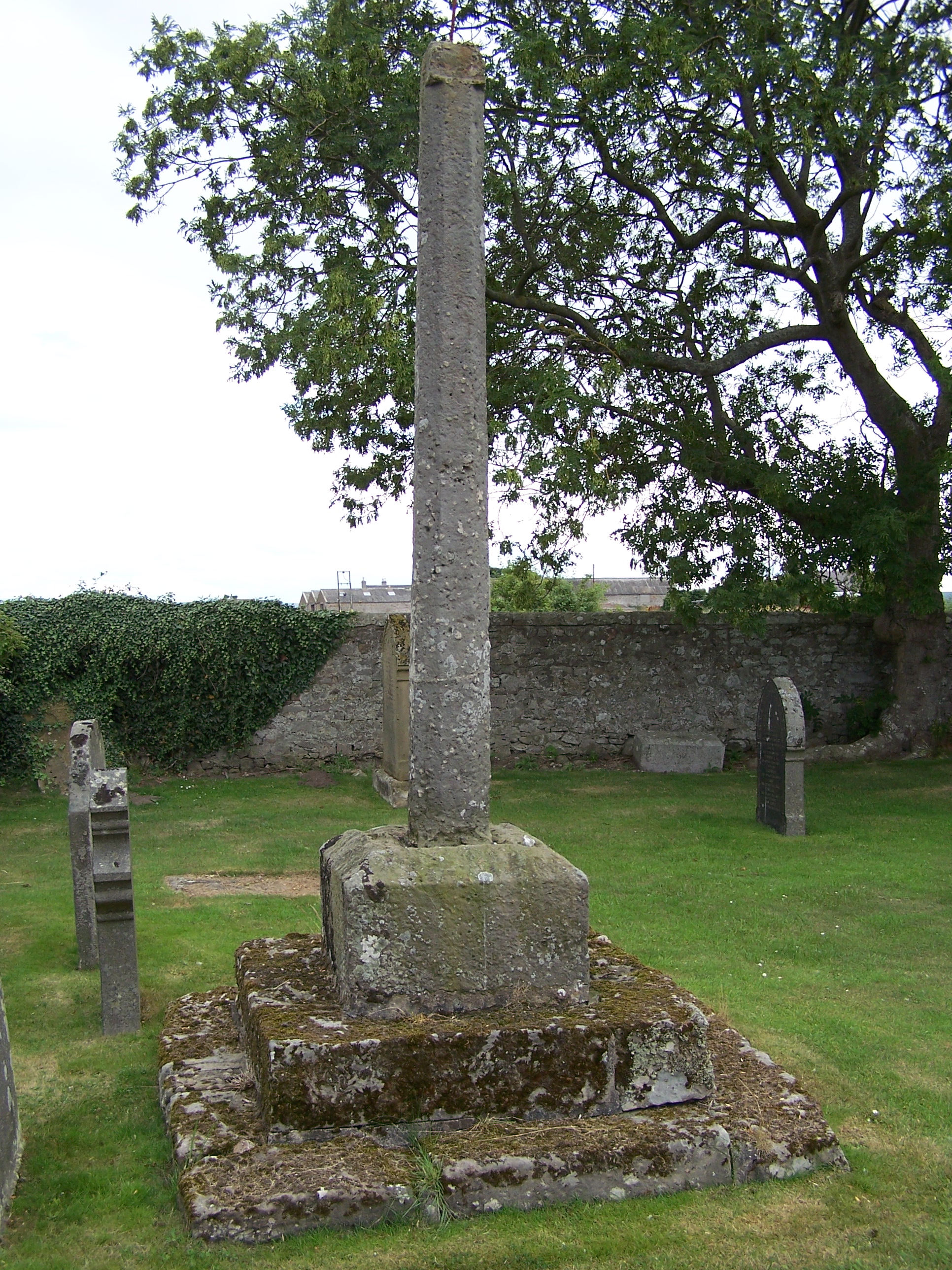
The mercat cross of Kinneddar, standing in the old Kirkyard

Kinneddar is a small settlement on the outskirts of Lossiemouth in Moray, Scotland, near the main entrance to RAF Lossiemouth. Long predating the modern town of Lossiemouth, Kinneddar was a major monastic centre for the Pictish kingdom of Fortriu from the 6th or 7th centuries, and the source of the important collection of Pictish stones called the Drainie Carved Stones. The Kirk of Kinneddar was the cathedral of the Diocese of Moray between 1187 and 1208, and remained an important centre of diocesan administration and residence of the Bishop of Moray through the 13th and 14th centuries.

Today little remains of the site except the old kirkyard, including the former parish cross. The Bishop's Palace at Kinneddar went out of use in the 15th century when the barony of Kinneddar was combined into the larger barony of Spynie, with stone from the palace being used to build Spynie Palace. The Kirk of Kinneddar became redundant when its parish was combined with that of Ogstoun to form the new parish of Drainie in 1669.

== Name ==
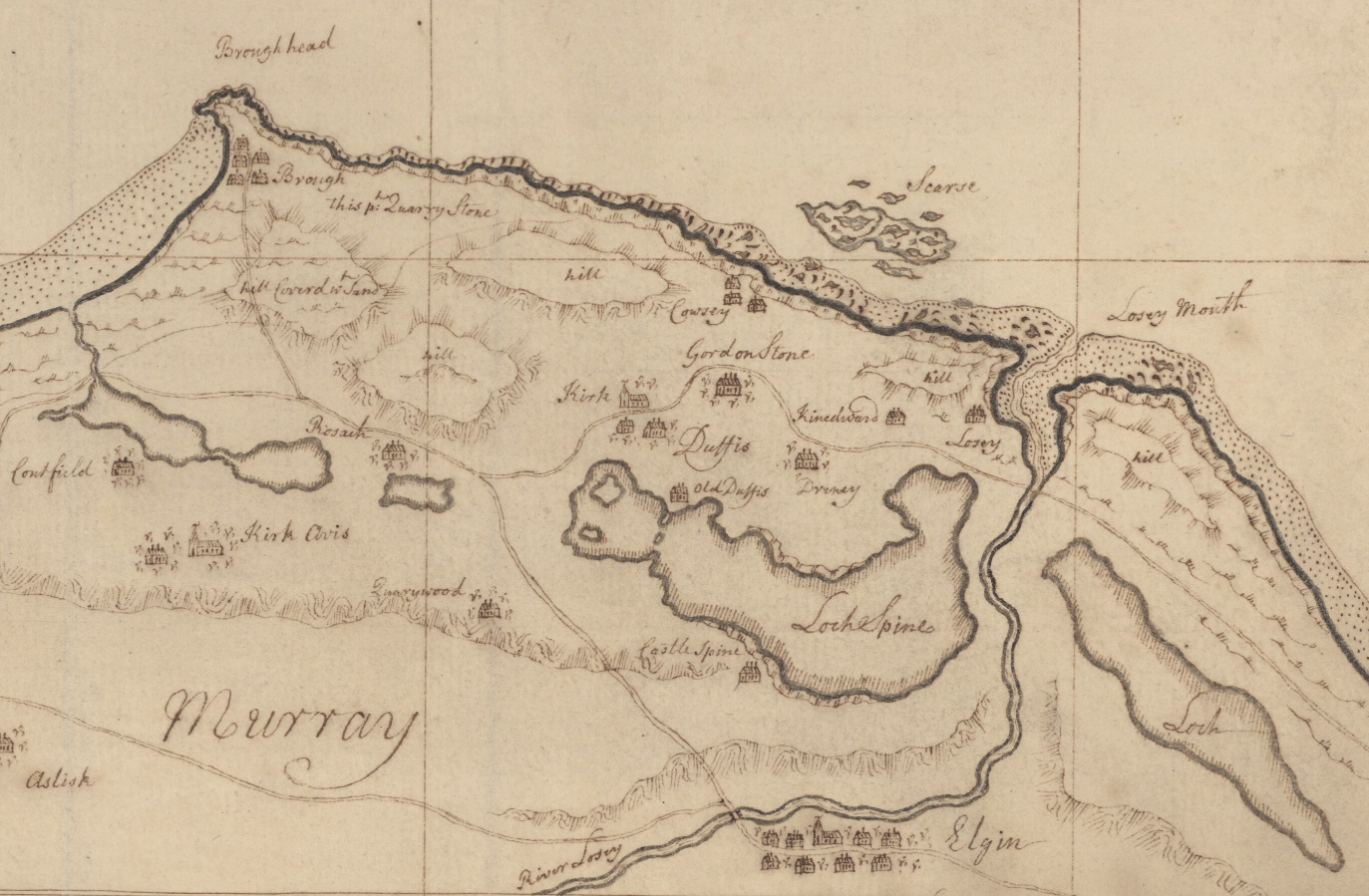
Kinneddar shown as "Kinedward" on a 1730 military map of Moray, also showing the remnants of the sea loch that originally cut the site off from the mainland.

The place name Kinneddar comes from two Gaelic elements: cenn, meaning "head" or "end", and foithir, probably derived from a Pictish word meaning "district" or "region". Although Gaelic in form, foithir is only found in placenames in former Pictish areas of eastern Scotland, where it often refers to high-status areas. The name therefore probably reflects Kinneddar's status as a subsidiary centre of a high-status administrative area, probably centred on Burghead.

== Location ==
Kinneddar is located on a raised ridge of land originally on the edge of Loch Spynie, with the loch's marshes surrounding the site on three sides. Loch Spynie was a sea loch during the medieval period, stretching 11 km from Kinneddar west to Burghead and providing sheltered anchorage for seagoing vessels. Kinneddar was still described as being "in a corner of the sea" in 1207, but blown sand had cut the loch off from the sea creating a freshwater loch by the 17th century and in the 19th century the loch was drained to its current size.

The sandstone ridge between the modern towns of Burghead and Lossiemouth would have been an island during the early medieval period and contained a group of unique and interrelated Pictish sites: as well as the religious site at Kinneddar there was Burghead Fort – the largest fortified site in early historic Scotland – and the Sculptor's Cave at Covesea, which was important to the Picts as a ritual centre. This area was probably the most important centre of royal power for the Pictish kingdom of Fortriu, which flourished from the 4th to the 9th centuries.

== History ==
=== Pictish monastic site ===
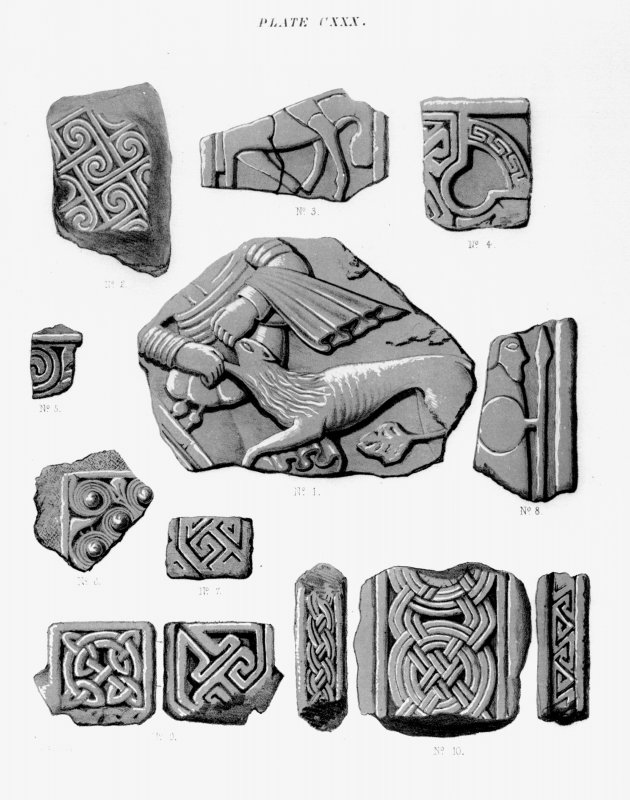
Engraving of thirteen of the Drainie Carved Stones, discovered at Kinneddar in 1855

Kinneddar was one of the major ecclesiastical centres of the Picts, with radiocarbon dating showing activity on the site from the 7th century through to its first appearance in documentary records in the 12th century, and possible activity as early as the late 6th century. The site was surrounded by vallum ditches first cut during the 7th century enclosing an area of 8.6 hectares – the largest such enclosure discovered within the territory of Northern Pictland. Within the enclosure there is evidence of a significant settlement and industry, including a smithing hearth and evidence of ironworking, and the postholes of large wooden roundhouses. Annexe enclosures to the south of the main enclosure and dating to the 11th and 12th centuries suggest that the site grew in size and importance over time.

The scale and layout of the site is very similar to that of Iona Abbey, suggesting that the establishment of Kinneddar may have been connected with the church of Columba.

Kinneddar was the source of an important collection of carved Pictish stones, the 32 fragments representing parts of ten cross-slabs, three free-standing crosses and at least eight panels from stone shrine chests. Some of the sculpture is unfinished showing that it was produced on-site. The stones are decorated with patterns including knotwork and ring-headed crosses, but also include several illustrating human figures such as horse riders and warriors with spears, and one Class I stone decorated with a crescent and V-rod pattern. Particularly significant is the carving on a fragment of a panel representing the biblical King David wrenching open the jaws of a lion. This is similar to the decoration on the more complete St Andrews Sarcophagus from St Andrews Cathedral and is likely to have contained the body or relics of a king or important saint. David was an imperial symbol closely associated with royal power and this iconography indicates that Kinneddar was a focus for extensive royal patronage, perhaps linked to nearby Burghead Fort. The sculpture from Kinneddar is closely linked to that found at the monastic site at Portmahomack, indicating that these two monastic houses may have enjoyed the bulk of royal patronage within the kingdom of Fortriu.

The Pictish sculptures found in the vicinity of the castle and kirkyard point to the area being an important 8th-century Christian centre (see Culdees) and may have been a principal location for the conversion of the Picts.

=== Kinneddar Kirk ===
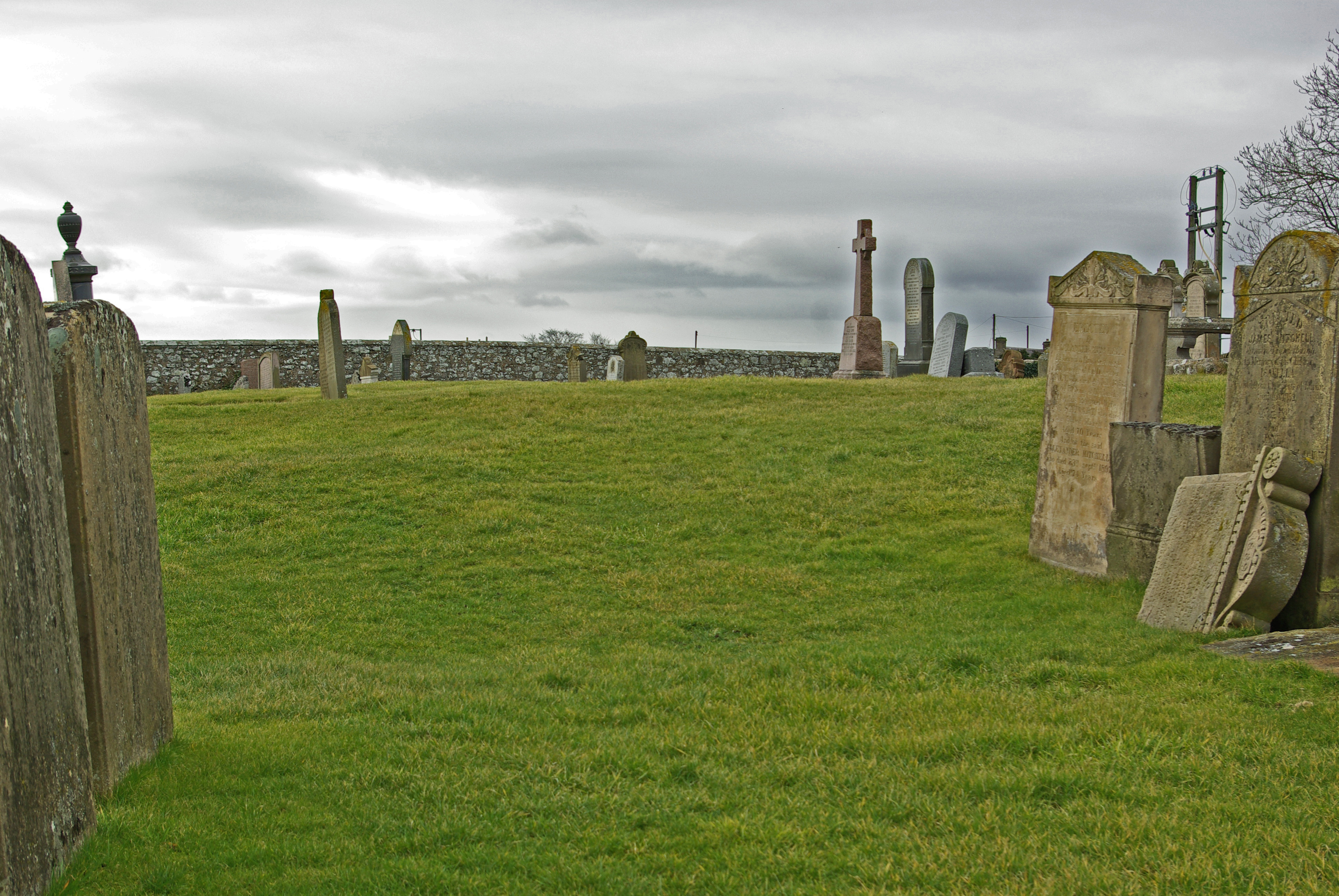
Kinneddar kirkyard with the raised mound giving the location of the ancient Kirk of Kinneddar

Within the area of the earlier monastic enclosure stood the ancient Kirk of Kinneddar. At least two shrines existed within the kirk between the 8th and 10th centuries, probably containing one or more saint's relics. One of these may have been the oratory or cell with a "stone bed" established at Kinneddar by the early medieval saint Gervadius, according to the 16th century Aberdeen Breviary.

Kinneddar was adopted as the cathedral of the Diocese of Moray by Richard de Lincoln while he was Bishop of Moray between 1187 and 1203, following the move of the bishop's seat from Birnie. In 1207/8 the seat of the diocese moved again with Spynie being confirmed as the cathedral of Moray by Pope Innocent III.

Although Kinneddar ceased to be a cathedral it remained important within the diocese, and charter evidence shows that it was the site of the bishopric's charter ceremonies on at least six occasions between 1226 and 1328, and was the site of the signing of a diocesan memorandum during the bishopric of Alexander Bur (1362–1397). Gothic tracery was added to the kirk during the bishopric of Archibald between 1252 and 1298, and when the Bishop's Palace was abandoned its tower was used by the kirk as a belfry.

The parish of Kinneddar was merged with that of Ogstoun to form the new parish of Drainie on 17 February 1669. The kirk at Kinneddar went out of use in 1676, with stone from Kinneddar being used to construct the new kirk at Drainie. Although the foundations of the kirk at Kinneddar were recorded as still being visible in 1760, by 1792 only "vestiges" remained.

=== Bishop's Palace ===
Bishop Archibald enlarged or rebuilt the castle in c. 1280 and it continued to be used by the bishops until the late 14th century. The palace was attacked and burned by Robert the Bruce and David de Moravia in 1308, but was repaired and recorded as the residence of Bishop Alexander Bur in 1383. The palace remained the head of the barony of Kinneddar until 1451, when all nine baronies held by the Bishops of Moray were combined into a single barony headed by Spynie, and from 1462 Bishop David Stewart may have used stone from the now-redundant palace at Kinneddar in his building of the David Tower at Spynie Palace. By 1623 it was being described as palatium dirutum - the "ruined" or "destroyed" palace.

Nothing now exists of the castle except one fragment of a rubble wall that is integrated into the Kinneddar kirkyard boundary wall.

The ruinous structure still existed in 1734 and was described as being a central tower enclosed by two concentric hexagonal walls which made it unique in Scottish terms.
