= Felix of Moray =

Felix was a 12th-century prelate based in Scotland. His career is rather obscure, and he himself is little more than a name of a Bishop of Moray. Felix appears to have been the successor to Bishop William, Papal legate, who died in 1162. We know that the diocese of Moray was still vacant in 1164, and Felix does not occur in the records until some point between 1166 and 1171. Felix must have died or, less likely, resigned the bishopric in either 1170 or 1171, for in the latter year his successor Simon de Tosny received election.

Religious titles
| Preceded by William | Bishop of Moray fl. 1166 x 1171 | Succeeded by Simon de Tosny |
