= Archibald Bishop (disambiguation) =

Archibald Bishop (1829–1901) was a Canadian politician.

Archibald Bishop may also refer to:

- Archie Bishop, character in The Dead (Higson novel)

== See also ==
- Archibald (Bishop of Moray)
