= William Hay (bishop) =

Scottish clergyman and prelate

William Hay (17 February 1647 – 17 March 1707) was a Scottish clergyman and prelate who rose to be the final Church of Scotland Bishop of Moray.

== Life ==
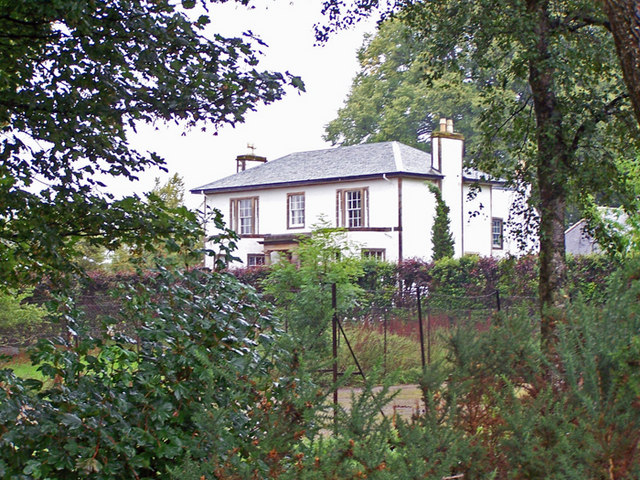
Castlehill House, Inverness

He was born on 17 February 1647 the eldest son of William Hay, Master of the Music School in Old Aberdeen.

He was educated at the University of Aberdeen and entered the Church of Scotland being ordained by Bishop Patrick Scougal, Bishop of Aberdeen. Hay was appointed to Kilconquhar parish church in Fife in November 1673 and St Andrews University awarded him a Doctor of Divinity in 1687 before moving to Perth in March 1684. In early 1688 he was selected to be Bishop of Moray and was consecrated on 4 February 1688.

On 31 March 1689 he preached at the Easter Sunday service at St Giles Cathedral in Edinburgh which was notable due to the assassination of Lord President Sir George Lockhart, Lord Carnwath by John Chieslie on his leaving the church.

However, Hay's days as a bishop were not to last long. In the following year Bishop Hay, along with all other Scottish bishops, was deprived of his see. He refused to take an oath of fealty to King William and Queen Mary and was expelled from Spynie Palace, its last episcopal occupant.

== Family ==
He married Margaret Wemyss daughter of Robert Wemyss of Castlehill. They had two daughters: Sophia and Jean.

== Death ==
He died at his son-in-law's house: Castlehill House in Inverness, on 19 March 1707.

Church of Scotland titles
Preceded by Alexander Rose	Bishop of Moray; 1688–1689	Episcopacy abolished
