= John Guthrie (bishop of Moray) =

Scottish prelate

- Bishop of Moray
- See: Diocese of Moray
- In office: 1623–1638
- Predecessor: Alexander Douglas
- Successor: Vacant (1638–1662); next bishop was Murdoch MacKenzie
- Previous post(s): Minister of Kinnell, Arbirlot, Perth, then St Giles

Orders
- Consecration: October 1623

Personal details
- Born: 1580s Scotland
- Died: 28 August 1649; Guthrie, Angus

John Guthrie (died 28 August 1649) was a Scottish prelate active in the first half of the 17th century who became Bishop of Moray.

== Life ==
The son of the goldsmith Patrick Guthrie and Margaret née Rait, in 1597 he completed an MA at the University of St Andrews, becoming a Reader at the church of Arbroath in the same year. Two years later, on 27 August 1599, he became minister of Kinnell parish church in Angus (Presbytery of Arbroath). In the following years he was translated to various churches. In 1603, he became minister of Arbirlot parish, Angus. In 1617, he became minister in the city of Perth, before, on 15 June 1621, becoming minister of the parish of St Giles in Edinburgh.

Guthrie used his appointments as a platform for involvement in the national church. As minister of Arbirlot, he was one of the commissioners of the Presbytery of Arbroath at the Glasgow assembly of 1610. Later in that year, he got elected as clerk of the synod of St Andrews. He was a member and commissioner of the Perth assembly in 1618. In this period he established himself as an ardent supporter of the crown and its episcopalian policies. It was this that brought him the prestigious and important charge of St Giles in 1621. It was no surprise that, only two years later, he rose to episcopal rank, obtaining crown nomination to the vacant diocese of Moray on 21 July 1623. He was provided to the see on 16 August of the same year, and received consecration in October.

As Bishop of Moray, Guthrie remained a staunch royalist, an active anti-Catholic and keen promoter of ecclesiastical discipline. He took a large role in the Scottish coronation of King Charles I in 1633. Bishop Guthrie supported the King's plans to bring the Scottish church in line with the Church of England, authorising all ministers in Moray to obtain and use the new Scottish Book of Common Prayer. Bishop Guthrie was, however, out of touch with general religious sentiment in Scotland, and the Glasgow assembly of Scottish churchmen deposed him from his bishopric on 11 December 1638. Guthrie refused to accept this deposition and refused to recognise the legality of the National Covenant. He preached against it into the Spring of 1639 and on 11 July 1639 he was excommunicated by the Scottish church. He attempted to hold out in Spynie Palace. On 16 July 1640, Major-General Robert Monro of Foulis captured the palace. Guthrie was sent to Edinburgh and imprisoned in the city's Tolbooth.

He was later released, and retired to his estate, purchased in 1636, at Guthrie, Angus.

John died at Guthrie on 28 August 1649 and was buried at the Guthrie Collegiate Aisle, the local parish church.

== Family ==
Guthrie married Nichola Wood, by whom he had three sons (John, Patrick, and Andrew) and three daughters (Bethia, Nicolas, and Lucretia). His oldest son John (d. 1643) followed his father into the ministry, while his youngest son Andrew fought as a royalist during the English Civil War, being captured at the Battle of Philiphaugh (1645) and executed soon after.

Religious titles
Preceded by Alexander Douglas II	Bishop of Moray; 1623–1638	Vacant Title next held by Murdoch MacKenzie
