= Simon de Gunby =

Scottish Catholic bishop

Simon was a 13th-century prelate based in Moray, Scotland. Professor Donald Watt has shown (Fasti, 219), through the extrapolation of indirect evidence, that his surname was almost certainly "de Gunby".

He occurs as Dean of Moray in 1230. Simon held this position until, after the death of Andreas de Moravia, he was elected as the new Bishop of Moray. A Papal mandate of 3 March 1244, from Pope Innocent IV authorized the Bishop of Caithness (Gilbert de Moravia) and one Martin, clerk of the papal Camera Apostolica, to inquire about the legality of the election and if appropriate confirm and consecrate Simon. This process was apparently successful for Simon, as he held the episcopate until his death in 1251.

Religious titles
| Preceded by Hugh de Douglas | Dean of Moray; 1230–1244 | Succeeded by Archibald |
| Preceded by Andreas | Bishop of Moray; 1244–1251 | Succeeded by Radulf |
