= Radulf of Lincoln =

Radulf or Ralph was a canon of the Bishopric of Lincoln and also identified as Master Radulf de Leicester . Following the death of Simon de Gunby, Bishop of Moray, he was elected c. 1252 as the new bishop.

Radulf was one of at least three 12th and 13th century bishops of Moray to come from Lincolnshire. He may have been the Radulf, also from Lincoln, who appeared as a witness to a charter of Bishop Simon. There is no record of a consecration, though that cannot be regarded as firm evidence that no consecration took place. Radulf may have died before his consecration or may have become a casualty of the disruption that was taking place during the minority of Alexander III and which impacted on appointments to vacant bishoprics. In 1253 there was a new bishop by the name of Archibald.

== Notes ==
Religious titles
Preceded by Simon de Gunby	Bishop of Moray; 1252	Succeeded by Archibald
