= Spynie Palace =

Ruined castle in Moray, Scotland

- Spynie, near Elgin, Moray, Scotland
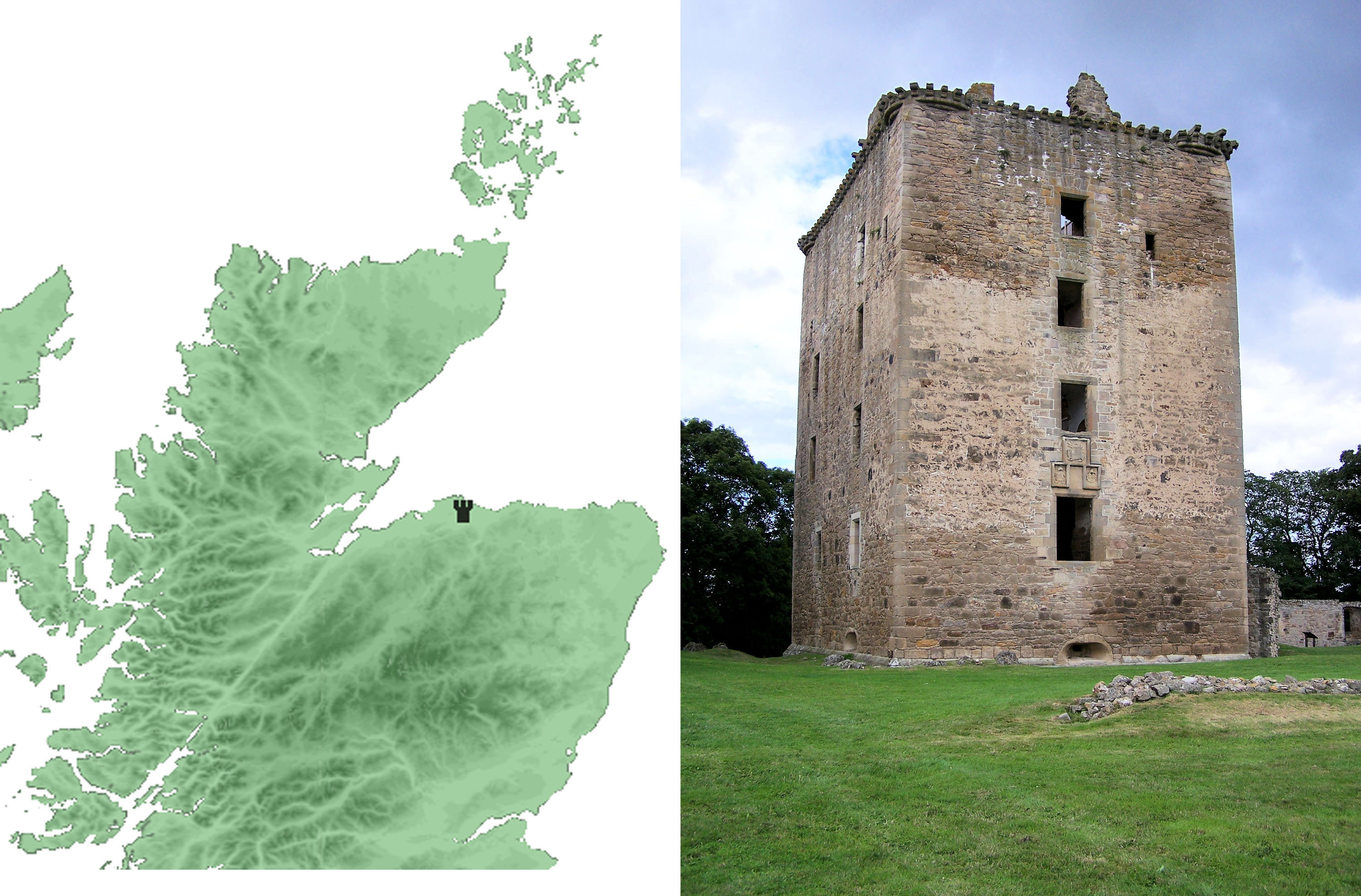

Site information
- Type: Keep with curtain wall
- Owner: Historic Environment Scotland
- Open to the public: Yes
- Condition: Ruin

Location
- Coordinates: 57°40′34″N 03°17′29″W
- Height: 22 metres

Site history
- Built: 1st c1150 2nd c1250
- Built by: Bishop of Moray
- In use: c1150 – 1689
- Materials: Sandstone
- Events: besieged 1640 and 1645

Spynie Palace, also known as Spynie Castle, was the fortified seat of the Bishops of Moray for about 500 years in Spynie, Moray, Scotland. The founding of the palace dates back to the late 12th century. It is situated about 500 m from the location of the first officially settled Cathedral Church of the Diocese of Moray, Holy Trinity Church in present-day Spynie Churchyard. For most of its occupied history, the castle was not described as a palace — this term first appeared in the Registry of Moray in a writ of 1524.

== Background ==
The beginnings of the Bishopric of Moray are unclear. The first mention of a bishop was Gregoir whose name appeared on several royal charters in the 1120s. The early bishops of Moray had no fixed abode but moved between houses at Birnie, Kinneddar and Spynie. In 1172, King William I, the Lion, made grants to the church of the Holy Trinity of the Bishopric of Moray and Bishop Simon de Tosny. Formal permission for the permanent move to Spynie was given by Pope Innocent III to Bishop Bricius de Douglas in April 1206 and the transfer was probably made by 1208. Bishop Bricius attended the Fourth Lateran Council in 1215 and may have appealed to Innocent to transfer the See of Moray to Elgin. However, he certainly wrote to him requesting the move before July 1216. The cathedral church of Spynie was considered vulnerable to attack and too far from the market. Elgin with its royal castle would have been seen as a better option. Bricius did not live to see the changes made, dying in 1222, but his successor, Bishop Andrew of Moray carried them out. Although the See of Moray was transferred to the Church of the Holy Trinity in Elgin on 19 July 1224, the Bishop of Moray's episcopal palace remained at Spynie.

== The fortified residence ==
=== 12th and 13th centuries ===
The first castle was a wooden structure built in the late 12th century and was revealed in excavations carried out between 1986 and 1994. The excavated evidence suggests that the buildings were surrounded by a rectangular ring work and ditch which seem to have enclosed an area of roughly the same as the 14th-century curtain wall, i.e., an enclosure of 45 – 65 m and is large even by medieval ring works found elsewhere in Britain. The buildings would likely have consisted of the bishop's house with a hall, a bed chamber and a chapel and also holding a brewhouse and a bakehouse.

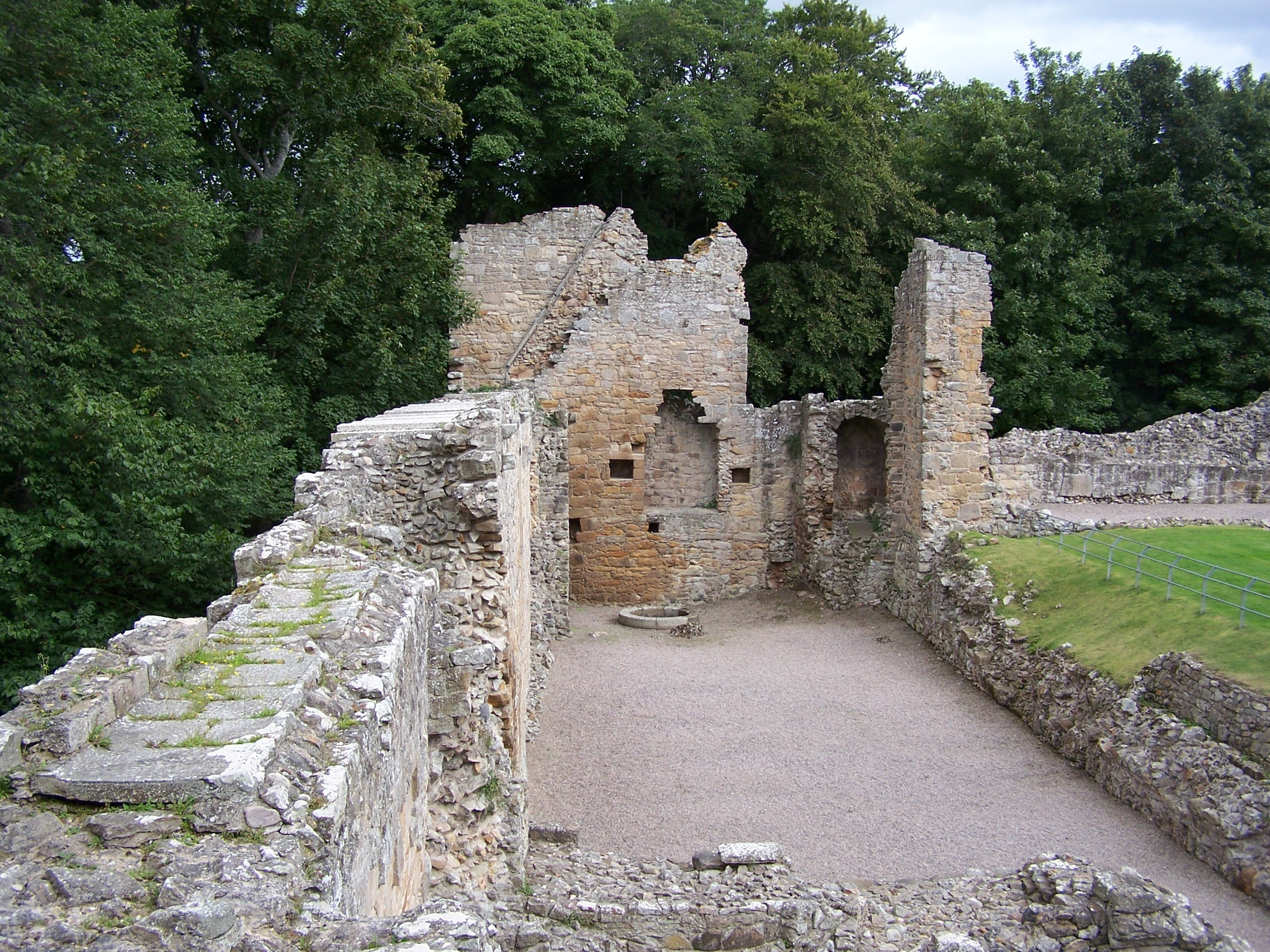
The early living quarters

The stone buildings first appeared in the 13th century with the establishment of what was thought to have been a chapel and which had coloured glass windows.

The first recorded mention of the castle is in a document held in the British Museum. This manuscript dates from the early 14th century but appears to have been compiled between 1292 and 1296 and was apparently for the use of English administrators during King Edward I of England's occupation of Scotland. The first writ issued at Spynie Castle was in 1343 and is recorded in the Register of Moray

=== 14th and early 15th centuries ===
The remaining wooden buildings were gradually replaced with stone, and this continued through into the 14th century when the first main castle building was erected. This was a near-square structure built within a 7-metre-high curtain wall. The main entrance in the wall faced to the south and a tower that projected from the south-east corner had narrow openings for archers.

In this period Alexander Stewart, Earl of Buchan, otherwise known as the Wolf of Badenoch, attacked and burned Elgin Cathedral in June 1390. It also appears that he took Spynie Castle as King Robert III (Buchan's brother) issued an instruction to Buchan in August 1390 forbidding him to 'intromit' the Castle of Spynie for any reason. Following Bishop Alexander Bur's death in 1397, the King, in conformity with feudal established practice during the period of the vacant seat, took possession of the castle and perversely appointed the now reformed Wolf of Badenoch to be warden of the castle. After the election of the new bishop, the King issued a writ on 3 May 1398 to Buchan to hand over the castle and contents to Bishop William without claiming expenses.

=== Later 15th and 16th centuries ===
It is thought that Bishop John de Winchester (1435–60) was responsible for moving the main gate to the east wall which contained a strong portcullis. The architectural detail of the upper section of the gate remains and shows the gatekeeper's room complete with a small fireplace. John, as well as being the Bishop of Moray, was also the king's Master of Works and had been responsible for alterations to the castles at Inverness and Urquhart as well as the palace at Linlithgow. The fine stonework and styling of the gate may have been carried out by the master masons working on the restoration work at Elgin Cathedral following its destruction in 1390.

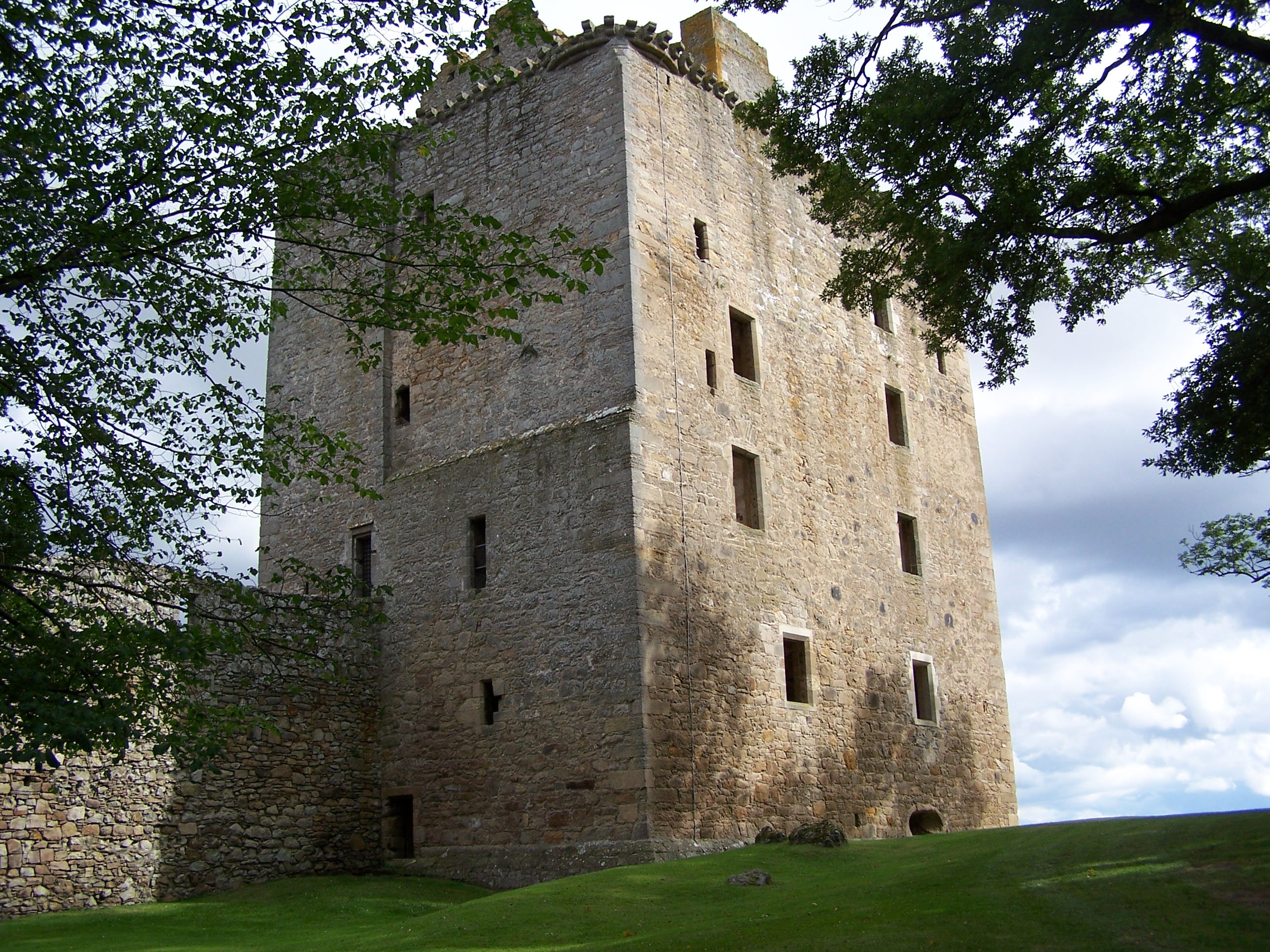
David's Tower

The most significant buildings were established in the later 15th century through into the 16th century when David's Tower (also known as Davey's Tower) was built along with other substantial accommodation areas. The tower is the largest by volume of all medieval Scottish towers measuring 19 m by 13.5 m and 22 m in height and was started by Bishop David Stewart (1462–76) and completed by Bishop William Tulloch (1477–82). It has 6 storeys above ground and had a garret on the top. Below ground is a vaulted basement which is approximately 1.5 m below the level of the courtyard; it contains a circular dungeon, 5.3 m in diameter, lit only by a narrow loop looking to the west and has a slightly domed vaulted roof. The ground floor contained the hall which is 12.8 m by 6.7 m and lit by large windows with built-in stone seats. At the NE corner was a spiral staircase which led to the upper floors. Each of these floors was similar in design with a single large room and smaller chambers leading off it. The tower is plain and practically lacking in architectural features; the external walls were originally rendered while the internal walls were plastered.

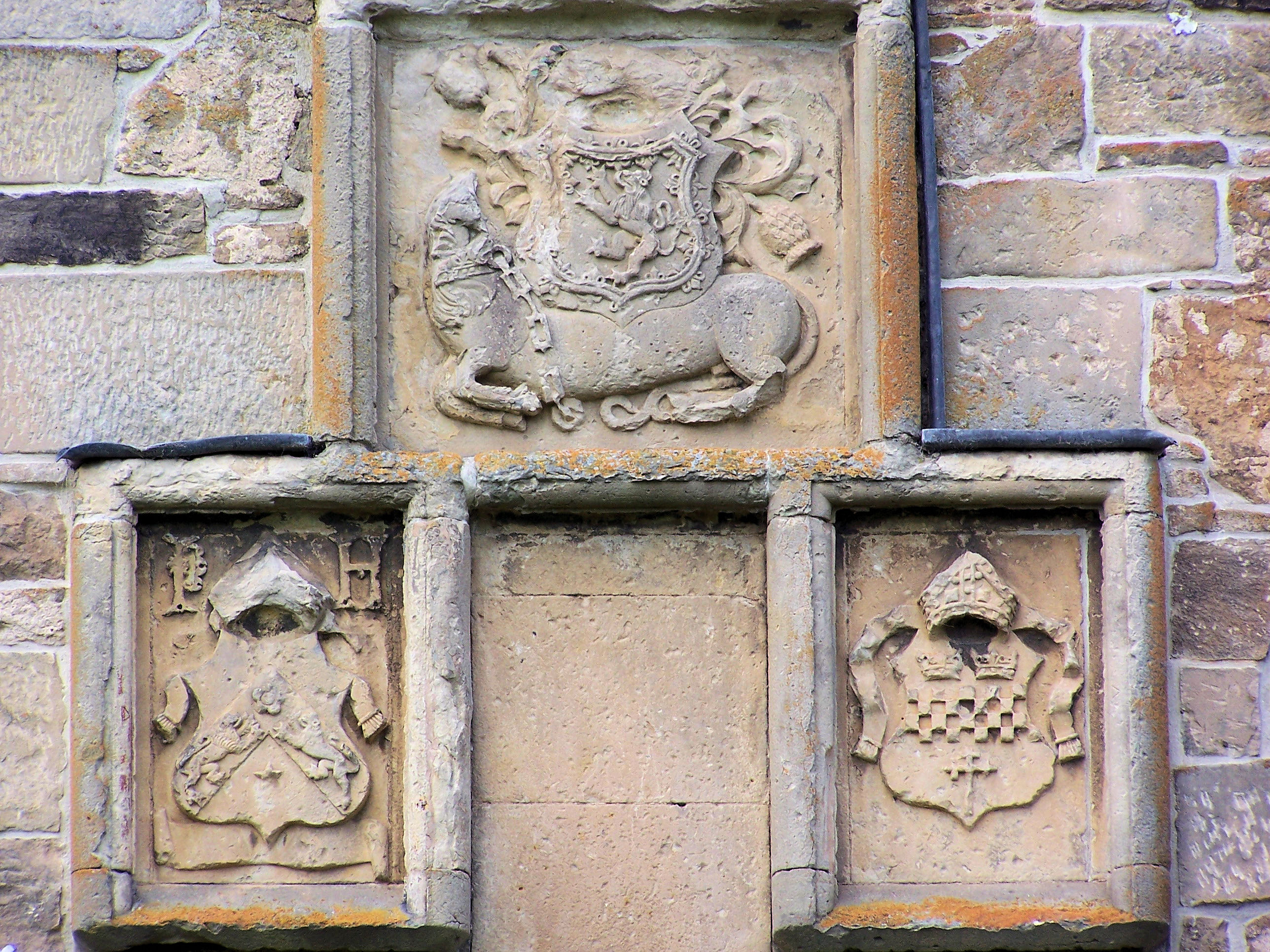
Bishops David Stewart's and Patrick Hepburn's armorial shields below

Stewart was also responsible for converting the old hall in the west range to kitchens to service the tower. It was said that the building of the tower was a reaction to intimidation from the Earl of Huntly whom Stewart had excommunicated for failing to pay his taxes. A financial record from 1538 mentions that John Be was the doorkeeper or "janitor" at Spynie Palace and Tibete Leyrmonth was the washerwoman. English prisoners were held at Spynie during the war known as the Rough Wooing, including Edward Sutton, 4th Baron Dudley who was taken at Hume Castle in December 1548.

During the mid-16th century, a walled garden to the south of the castle precinct was established mainly to house an orchard. A deed was signed in the garden in 1556 indicating that it would have been a pleasant place to relax in. The household diet was further supplemented when a rabbit warren and a doocot were added in 1569. Bishop Patrick Hepburn (1538–73), the last Roman Catholic bishop at Spynie, installed wide-mouth gun loops to boost the castle defences and enlarged some windows. He continued to live at Spynie for a period after the Reformation.

Christopher Rokeby, an agent provocateur of Elizabeth I of England, who had tried to lead Mary, Queen of Scots, into a plot with English Roman Catholics, was imprisoned in Spynie Castle in 1566 for eighteen months during Bishop Patrick Hepburn's tenure. Hepburn fell foul of the Privy Council for sheltering his relative Bothwell at Spynie in 1567 who had fled from the battle of Carberry Hill first to Huntly Castle. Bothwell sailed to Orkney and Shetland, and finally to Denmark.

As part of the pacification following the abdication of Queen Mary and the subsequent Marian Civil War, Regent Morton, in a meeting of the Privy Council at Perth on 23 February 1573, ordered that the castle be made available to the Crown, if needed:

the hous of Spyne salbe randerit and deliverit to oure Soverane Lord and his Regent foirsaid quhen it salbe requirite on XV dayis warning, without prejudice of ony partiis rycht.

On 29 July 1587, King James VI gave the castle and estate to Alexander Lindsay, 1st Lord Spynie; and they remained in his hands until he surrendered them back to the Crown in December 1605. During this period in 1595, Spynie was one of the castles that had additional fortifications installed as protection against a perceived threat from the Spaniards.

=== 17th century ===
In 1606, King James restored to the bishopric of Moray the endowments that remained. Bishop John Guthrie, who was a well-known royalist, ceased to be the bishop in 1638 when all bishops were deposed by the general assembly – he and his family continued to live at Spynie however. Guthrie refused to subscribe to the Covenant and prepared the castle for a siege which duly arrived in 1640 in the form of Covenanter Col. Sir Robert Monro and his 800 men.

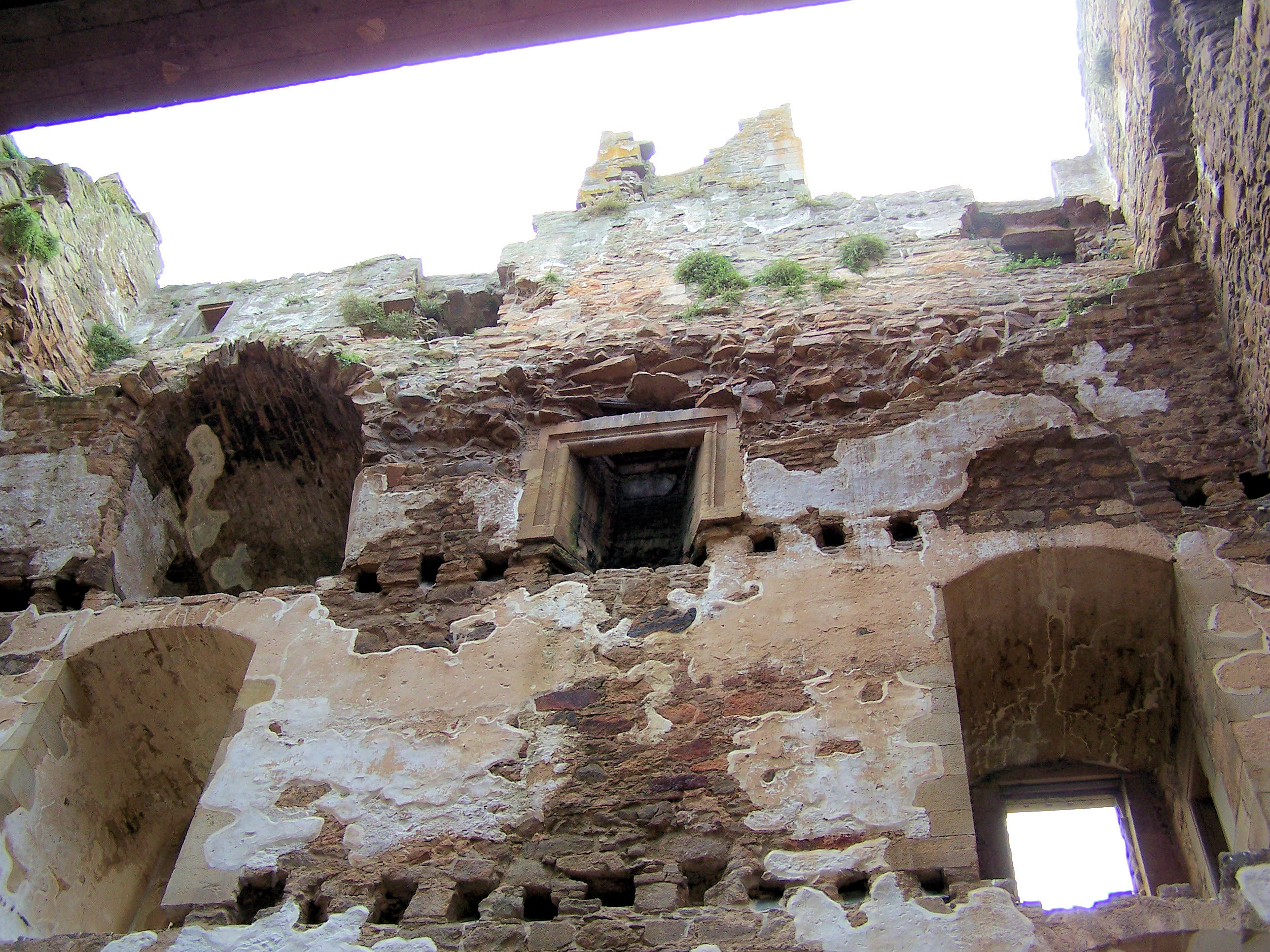
Interior of David's Tower showing putlog holes for floors and plastered walls

Guthrie surrendered the castle immediately on 16 July and the castle was disarmed, however he was allowed, together with his wife and servants, to stay within the castle. Although under house arrest, Guthrie was forced to pay for the upkeep of the garrison of twenty-four men. In September 1640, Guthrie was imprisoned in Aberdeen on rather dubious accusations. The castle was then granted to the Earl of Moray by King Charles I. Elgin and surrounding areas were staunchly anti-Royalist and after his victory against the Covenanters at Auldearn on 9 May 1645, James Graham, Marquis of Montrose turned his attention towards Elgin. The Laird of Innes and Grant of Ballindalloch and some burgesses from Elgin prepared the castle for a siege. Montrose occupied Elgin and burned the homes of leading Covenanter supporters in the town and the farmyard buildings belonging to Spynie but did not attempt to take the castle. Spynie had become the centre for the Covenanters in the area and this fact had not gone unnoticed by the Royalists. The Marquis of Huntly laid siege to the castle in late 1645 leaving Lord Lewis Gordon in charge but the castle's defences held until it was relieved by John Middleton, the future Earl of Middleton.

Following the restoration of Episcopacy to the Scottish Church in 1662 ownership of the castle passed back to the church, but it was starting to fall into decay. Parliament granted Bishop Murdo MacKenzie £1000 for repairs and this sustained the building up to 1689 when the last occupant, Bishop William Hay was expelled after refusing to take an oath of allegiance to King William and Queen Mary. The palace passed into the hands of the Crown and the fine ironwork and wood carvings removed. Local people plundered the walls for stonework for building works until the early 19th century when it passed into the ownership of James Dunbar-Brander of Pitgaveny. It was leased to the Department of the Works in 1974. The tower by that time had a pronounced bulge in the east wall - the structure being undermined by attempts by Covenanters to blow it up.

Major work to stabilise the structure was undertaken during the late 1970s using a large scaffold. Ultimately a curtain wall was reinstated disguising a large concrete plinth that prevents the tower from collapsing. The Palace was finally opened by Historic Scotland in 1994.

== Main references ==
- Buchanan, George: The History of Scotland, Vol III, 1856
- Donaldson, G: The Foundation of Elgin Cathedral, in Maclean, A 1974 (ed): Elgin Cathedral and Diocese of Moray, Inverness, p. 2
- Fawcett, R: Elgin Cathedral, Edinburgh, 1991
- Lewis, Pringle: Spynie Palace and the Bishops of Moray, Edinburgh, 2002
- MacGibbon; Ross: Castellated and Domestic Architecture of Scotland, Edinburgh, 1887
- Simpson, W D: The Palace of the Bishops of Moray at Spynie, Elgin, 1927
