= Bishop of Moray =

Head of the Diocese of Moray, Scotland

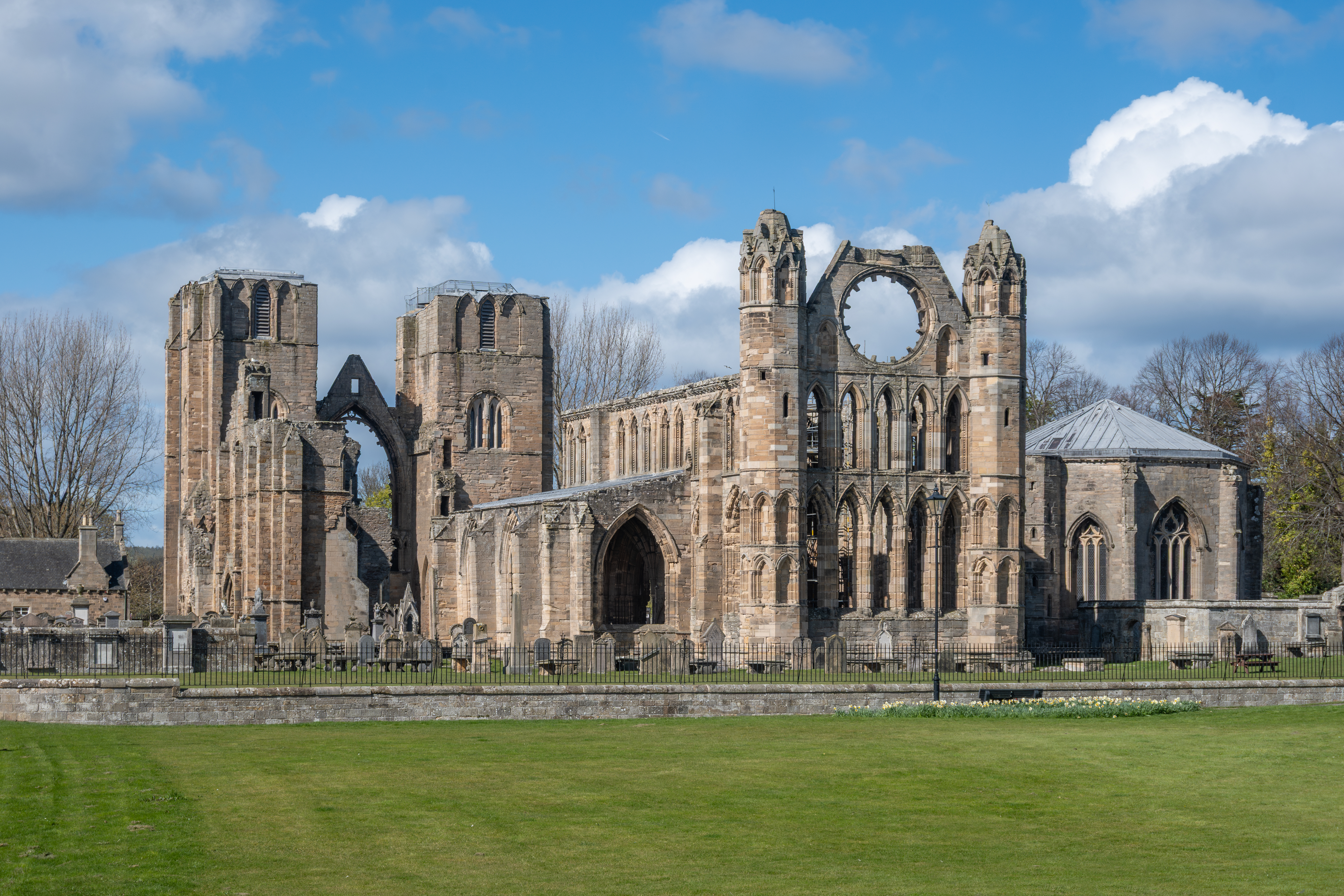
View of Elgin Cathedral from the south-east, 2010

The Bishop of Moray or Bishop of Elgin was the ecclesiastical head of the Diocese of Moray in northern Scotland, one of Scotland's 13 medieval bishoprics. If the foundation charter of the monastery at Scone is reliable, then the Bishopric of Moray was in existence as early as the reign of King Alexander I of Scotland (1107–1124), but was certainly in existence by 1127, when one Gregoir ("Gregorius") is mentioned as "Bishop of Moray" in a charter of king David I of Scotland. The bishopric had its seat (Latin: Cathedra) at Elgin and Elgin Cathedral, but was severally at Birnie, Kinneddar and as late as Bishop Andreas de Moravia at Spynie, where the bishops continued to maintain a palace. The Bishopric's links with Rome ceased to exist after the Scottish Reformation, but continued, saving temporary abolition between 1638 and 1661, under the episcopal Church of Scotland until the Revolution of 1688. Episcopacy in the established church in Scotland was permanently abolished in 1689. The Bishops fortified seat for over 500 years was at Spynie Palace.

== List of known bishops of Moray ==
Tenure	Incumbent	Notes
fl. x 1114–1127 x 1131	Gregoir of Moray	
fl. 1152 x 1153–1162	William	
fl. 1166 x 1171	Felix of Moray	
1171–1184	Simon de Tosny	
1184–1185	Andrew	
1187–1203	Richard de Lincoln	
1203–1222	Bricius de Douglas	He was Prior of Lesmahagow before ascending the bishopric of Moray. In this period, the name Bricius is more often a Latinization of the Gaelic names Máel Brigte and Gilla Brigte than a real name; but it is still possible that Bricius was indeed the bishop's real name. He is sometimes called "Bricius of Douglas".
1222–1242	Andreas de Moravia	
1244–1251	Simon de Gunby	Dean of the cathedral from 1232 until his election as bishop. He was buried in the choir of the cathedral.
el. 1252	Radulf of Lincoln	Radulf was a canon of the Bishopric of Lincoln; all that is known about him was that he was elected. How Archibald came to consecrated in 1253 instead of Ralph is not known.
1253–1298	Archibald	He rebuilt the palace of Kinneddor and made it his main residence. He died in December 1298.
1299–1326	David de Moravia	Consecrated at Anagni in Italy on the vigil of the holy apostles Peter and Paul in 1299. He founded the Scots College in Paris by donating the land on which it was built. The foundation confirmed by Charles le Bel, King of France in August 1326.
1326–1362	John de Pilmuir	The son of a Dundee burgess, he was consecrated by Pope John XXII. He continued what his predecessor began with the Scots College of the University of Paris. Its administration was to remain the responsibility of the Bishops of Moray until the Reformation.
1362–1397	Alexander Bur	Consecrated by Pope Urban V at Avignon in December 1396. Bur suffered at the hands of Alexander Stewart, Earl of Buchan when Stewart burned the cathedral along with the city's two monasteries, the church of St Giles and the hospital Domus Dei.
1397–1406	William de Spynie	Before his consecration by the anti-pope Benedict XIII in 1397, he was the Chantor of Moray. He died on 2 August 1406.
1407–1414	John de Innes	
1414–1422	Henry de Lichton	
1422–1435	Columba de Dunbar	
1436–1460	John de Winchester	
1460–1462	James Stewart	
1462–1476	David Stewart	
1477–1482	William Tulloch	
1482–1501	Andrew Stewart	
1501–1514 x 1516	Andrew Forman	
1516–1524	James Hepburn	
1525–1527	Robert Shaw	
nom. 1528	Alexander Douglas (elder)	Had crown nomination, but failed to obtain consecration because of political circumstances.
1529–1537	Alexander Stewart	
1538–1573	Patrick Hepburn	
1573–1589	George Douglas	Temporalities annexed to the crown after 1587, which were largely granted to Alexander Lindsay, 1st Lord Spynie in 1590, until surrendered back to crown in an arrangement with Bishop Alexander Douglas.
1602–1623	Alexander Douglas (younger)	
1623–1638	John Guthrie	Episcopy abolished on 13 December 1638. Died 1649.
1662–1677	Murdoch MacKenzie	Epicopy restored in 1661. Became Bishop of Orkney.
1677–1680	James Aitken	Became Bishop of Galloway.
1680–1686	Colin Falconer	Previously Bishop of Argyll.
1687	Alexander Rose	Became Bishop of Edinburgh.
1688	William Hay	The Revolution of 1688 led to the abolition of Episcopy in Church of Scotland.
