= Archibald (bishop of Moray) =

Scottish prelate

- Bishop of Moray
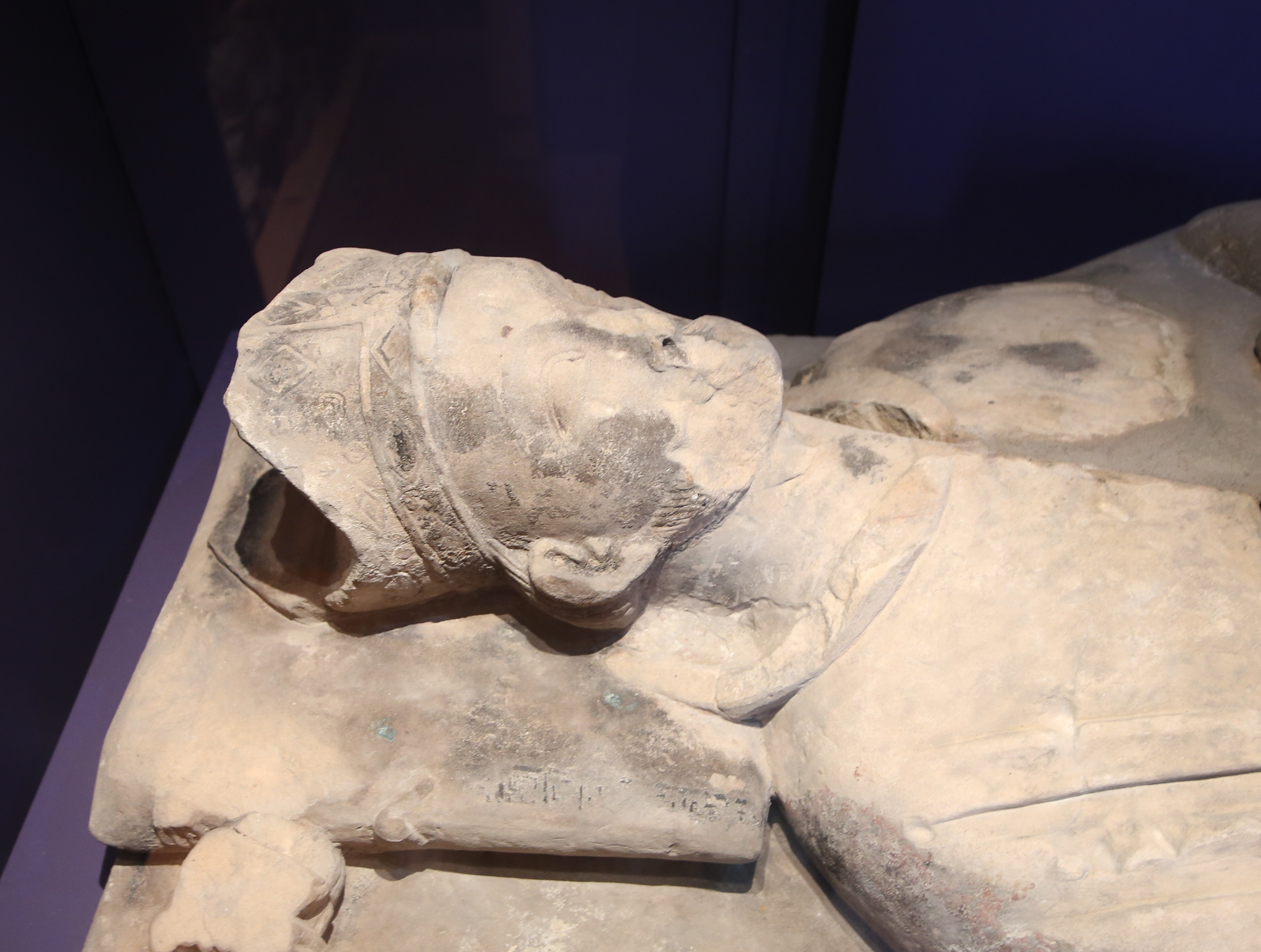
- An Effigy from Elgin Cathedral believed to depict Archibald
- Church: Roman Catholic Church
- See: Diocese of Moray
- In office: 1253–1298
- Predecessor: Simon de Gunby
- Successor: David de Moravia
- Previous post: Dean of Moray

Orders
- Consecration: 1253

Personal details
- Born: Unknown Probably Moray or Lanarkshire, Scotland
- Died: 9 December 1298 Moray

Archibald (died 1298) was a Scottish prelate best known for involvement in a dispute with the Pope.

His origins are not known, but he was almost certainly the Archibald who was Dean of Moray in the years before 1253.

In that year he was consecrated as the successor of Simon de Gunby and Radulf of Lincoln as Bishop of Moray. Through what appears to have been a misunderstanding, Bishop Archibald confirmed the election of one Andrew de Dunn as Dean of Moray. However, the Pope had earlier or simultaneously appointed his own candidate, Nicholas de Hedon, based on an earlier reservation of the position. There was litigation at the Papal see, through which Hedon emerged victoriously. Bishop Archibald, apparently concerned he had been placed in a state of excommunication, petitioned Pope Alexander IV and was absolved on 22 December 1255.

Bishop Archibald, like all Scottish bishops, was summoned to the Second Council of Lyon. A provincial council at Perth in 1273, however, exempted the Bishop of Moray as well as the Bishop of Dunkeld. Bishop Archibald was present at the Convention of Birgham in 1290.

At some point during his episcopate, Uilleam, Mormaer of Ross, committed an outrage to the church or lands of Petty, a church belonging to a canon of Archibald's cathedral. In compensation, Uilleam granted the bishop some lands in Cadboll and elsewhere in Ross. The bishop was also involved in a dispute with Uilleam, Mormaer of Mar, which in 1268 resulted in the latter's excommunication.

Bishop Archibald built an episcopal residence at Kinneddar, where he resided for much of his episcopate. His episcopate lasted over 45 years, making it one of the longest in medieval Scotland. He died on 9 December 1298.

== Notes ==
Religious titles
Preceded by Simon de Gunby	Dean of Moray; 1244 x 1249–1253	Succeeded by Andrew de Dunn (unconsecrated); Nicholas de Hedon
Preceded by Radulf	Bishop of Moray; 1253–1298	Succeeded by David de Moravia
