= William (bishop of Moray) =

William (died on 24 January 1162) was a 12th-century prelate based in the Kingdom of Scotland. He occurs in the records for the first time as Bishop of Moray in 1152 x 24 May 1153, late in the reign of King David I of Scotland (1124–53) witnessing a grant from that monarch of the church of Clackmannan to the Abbot of Cambuskenneth. The precise date of his accession is unknown but was probably in 1152.

William first witnessed a charter of King Máel Coluim IV at some date between May 1153 and April 1156. Bishop William travelled to Rome in 1159 on behalf of Máel Coluim probably regarding the proposal that the Bishopric of St Andrews be raised to metropolitan rank in order to thwart the Archbishop of York's claim to authority over the Scottish Church. He had returned as Papal legate with the usual powers to consecrate bishops and performed the consecration of Ernald of St Andrews on 20 November 1160. As demonstrated by his recorded actions it appears that he was an absentee bishop and seldom in his diocese. William died on 24 January 1162.

== Notes ==
Religious titles
Preceded by Gregoir	Bishop of Moray x 1153–1162	Succeeded by Felix
