= Birnie Symbol Stone =

Pictish artifact found in Scotland

Coordinates: 57.6116°N 3.33002°W

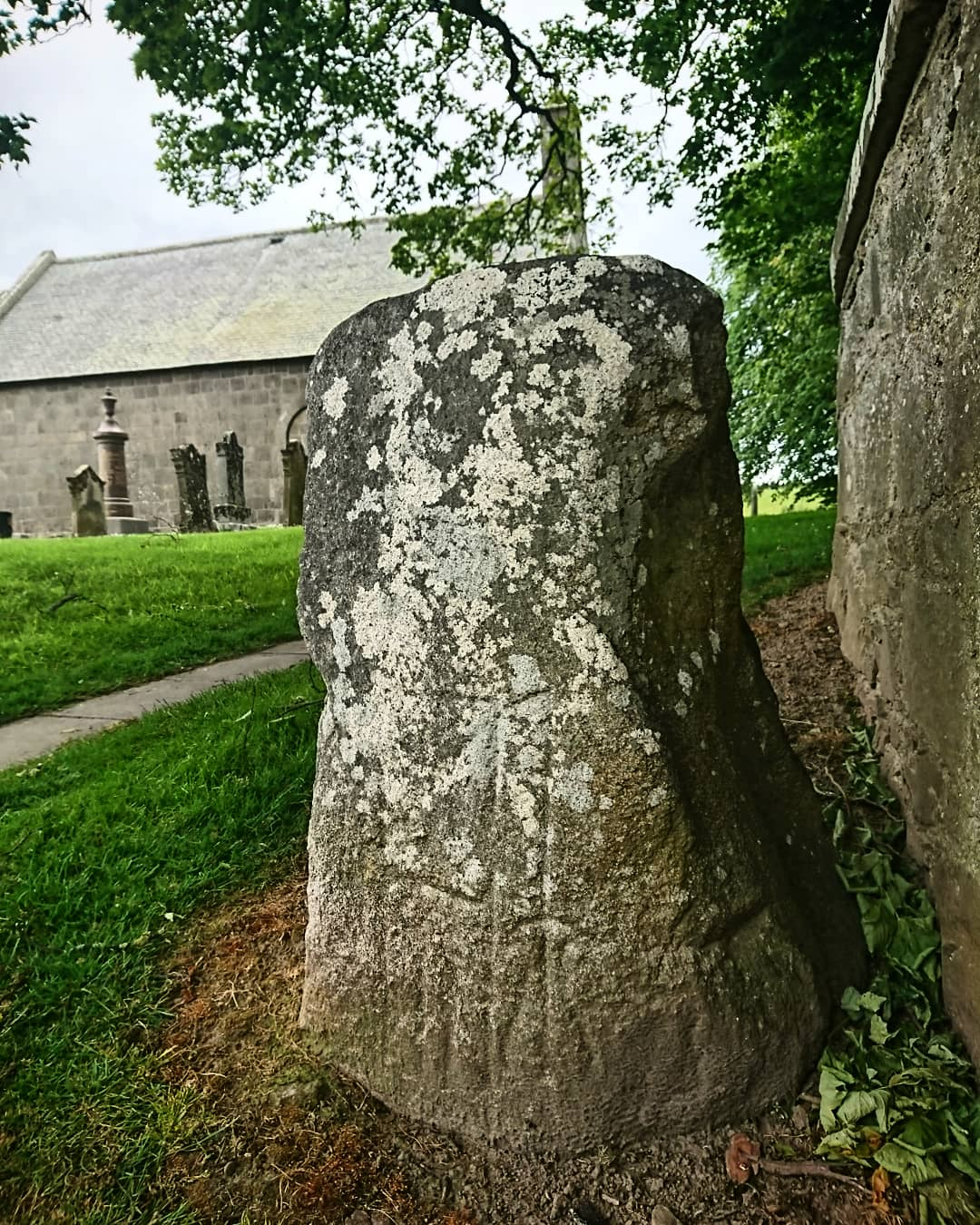
The Birnie Symbol Stone standing in the graveyard of Birnie Kirk

The Birnie Symbol Stone is a class I Pictish stone, now situated on the north side of the graveyard of Birnie Kirk, in Moray, Scotland. It was discovered in c. 1850 within the wall of the graveyard, from where it was moved to its current location.

== Description ==
The stone is thought to date from the 7th century and is made of granite, standing 1.00 metre (3 ft 3 in) high, 0.64 metres (2 ft 1 in) wide and 0.51 metres (1 ft 8 in) deep. It carries an incised image of a bird above a notched rectangle and Z-rod.

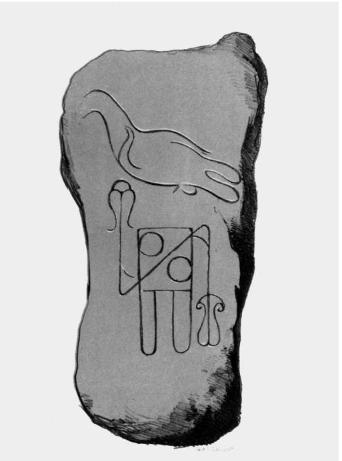
Illustration of the carvings on the Birnie Symbol Stone
