= Bricius de Douglas =

Scottish bishop (died 1222)

Bricius
- Bishop of Moray
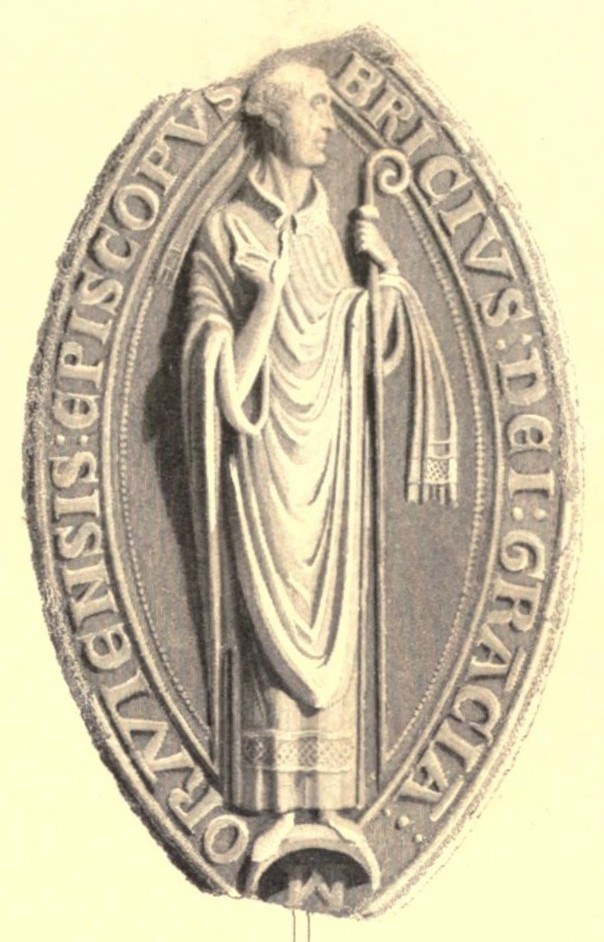
- Church: Roman Catholic Church
- See: Diocese of Moray
- In office: 1203–1222
- Predecessor: Richard
- Successor: Andreas de Moravia
- Previous post: Prior of Lesmahagow

Orders
- Consecration: 1203

Personal details
- Born: 12th century Probably Lanarkshire, Scotland
- Died: Moray, 1222

Bricius (sometimes anglicized as Brice, died 1222) was prior of Lesmahagow and afterward bishop of Moray (Gaelic epscop Muireb; Latin episcopus Moraviensis).

In this period, the name Bricius is more often a Latinization of the Gaelic names Máel Brigte ("tonsured devotee of St. Brigit") and Gilla Brigte ("devotee of St. Brigit") than a real name, although it is still possible that Bricius was indeed the bishop's real name. He is called Bricius Douglas by David Wilkins's Concilia magnae Britanniae et Hiberniae, and this is supported by two men who used this name, "Arkenbald and Henric" (Archibald and Henry), being called his brothers. Bricius appears to have been a son of William de Dufglas, and had five brothers, four of whom also became clerics, all in the Moray diocese. The fifth and presumably eldest brother, Archibald of Douglas, succeeded to the Barony of Douglas in Lanarkshire.

Bricius became bishop of Moray in 1203, although the exact details of this accession (i.e. election, consecration, etc.) are unknown. Unlike the two preceding bishops of Moray who had attained their appointments at the wish of King William, there is no evidence that Bricius's accession was similar. Instead, it may have been the powerful de Moravia family of Duffus that secured his position. On 7 April 1206, Bishop Bricius received papal permission to move the seat (Latin: cathedra) of the see of Moray from Birnie to Spynie. The move was probably complete by June 1208. It would not be until the episcopate of his successor, Andreas de Moravia, that the bishopric would settle at Elgin Cathedral, Elgin.

Bricius was one of the most important clerics in the Scotland of his time, that is, during the later part of the reign of William the Lion (r. 1165–1214) and early part of the reign of Alexander II (1214–1249). For instance, in 1207, Pope Innocent III appointed him judge-delegate of a dispute between Melrose Abbey and the Earl of Dunbar, two of the most important landowners in what for Moray-based Bricius was the remote English-speaking south-east of Scotland. In 1215, Bricius was one of three Scottish bishops to attend the Fourth Lateran Council at Rome (the other two were William de Malveisin, bishop of St Andrews and Walter, bishop of Glasgow). He returned to Rome in 1218, as part of a delegation of three Scottish bishops, including Walter of Glasgow, and Adam, bishop of Caithness, in order to obtain absolution from Pope Honorius III for the sentence of excommunication imposed on King Alexander II and the whole Kingdom of Scotland. This second visit to Rome is mentioned in Scottish sources, and confirmed by Papal records. The latter record that Bricius had solemnly denied practicing divine offices during the interdict.

Bricius, however, found his episcopate in disrepute. Church records indicate that the Archdeacon and Chancellor of Moray reported Bricius' corrupt behaviour, including over-taxing his flock, dissolving lawful marriages for payment, tolerating unlawful ones for payment and taking procurations without the appropriate visitations, and spending a good deal of the proceeds on the services of women. On 30 January 1219, Pope Honorius III instructed the abbots of Cupar Angus, Scone and Dunfermline to investigate these claims. The results are not known.

He died in the year 1222, and was succeeded by Andreas de Moravia.

Certain histories refer to "St Brice" in reference to this bishop. This, however, is almost certainly a case of misidentification with St Brice, Archbishop of Tours, a Gallo-Roman cleric and protégé of Saint Martin of Tours.

== General and cited references ==
- Dowden, John, The Bishops of Scotland, ed. J. Maitland Thomson, (Glasgow, 1912)
- Fawcett, Richard & Oram, Richard, Elgin Cathedral and the Diocese of Moray, Historic Scotland (Edinburgh, 2014), ISBN 978-1-84917-173-1,
- Fraser, Sir William. The Douglas Book IV Vols. Edinburgh, 1885.
- Maxwell, Sir Herbert, A History of the House of Douglas, II vols. (London, 1902)
- Tabraham, Chris, ed. Elgin Cathedral (Historic Scotland, 1999)

Religious titles
Preceded by Osbert	Prior of Lesmahagow x 1203	Succeeded by Hugh de Liam
Preceded by Richard de Lincoln	Bishop of Moray; 1203–1222	Succeeded by Andreas de Moravia
