= Prior of Lesmahagow =

The Prior of Lesmahagow (later Commendator of Lesmahagow) was the head of the medieval Tironensian monastic community of Lesmahagow Priory, located in modern South Lanarkshire. The following is a list of priors and commendators:

== List of priors ==
- Osbert, 1180
- Bricius, 1203
- Hugh de Liam, 1218 x 1220
- Waltheof (Waldeve), 1221 x 1226
- Thomas de Durham, x 1315
- John de Dalgarnock, 1348
- William, 1367–1369
- James Mador, 1468
- Richard Wylie, 1469–1470
- Alexander Wedall, 1477
- John Clasinwricht, 1477 x 1509
- N., x 1502
- Alexander Alani / Linton, 1502
- John Richardson, 1509

== List of commendators ==
- James Cunningham, 1561–1580
- David Collace of Auchenforsyth, 1586

== Bibliography ==
- Cowan, Ian B. & Easson, David E., Medieval Religious Houses: Scotland With an Appendix on the Houses in the Isle of Man, Second edition, (London, 1976), p. 69
- Watt, D. E. R. & Shead, N. F. (eds.), The Heads of Religious Houses in Scotland from the 12th to the 16th Centuries, The Scottish Records Society, New Series, Volume 24, (Edinburgh, 2001), pp. 134–6
