= Andreas de Moravia =

- Bishop of Moray
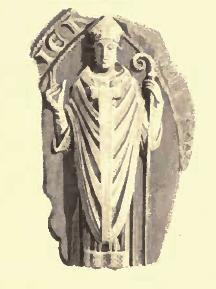
- Church: Roman Catholic Church
- See: Diocese of Moray
- In office: 1222–1242
- Predecessor: Bricius de Douglas
- Successor: Simon de Gunby
- Previous post: Bishop of Ross (elect)

Orders
- Consecration: 1223 x 1224

Personal details
- Born: Probably late 1100s Probably Moray
- Died: 1242 Moray

Andreas de Moravia (or Andrew of Moray) was a 13th-century Scottish bishop. He was a younger son of Hugh de Moravia, from the family of Flemish origin who were lords of Duffus and other areas in the Greater Moray region in this period. In the time of Bishop Bricius' episcopate (1203–1222), there was a man called "Andreas" who was rector of the church of St. Peter at Duffus, and this may well have been this Andreas. He may also have been a native Scot.

Andreas was elected as Bishop of Ross in 1213. However, he refused to accept the election, and obtained the consent of Pope Innocent III to resign this position. The reasoning can only be speculated. In 1222 though, Andreas did accept election when, after the death of Bricius the same year, he was elected Bishop of Moray. Andreas was in Rome before April 1224 when he is styled "Bishop" and it is probable that he was confirmed and consecrated during this period in the curia.

One of Andreas' first acts as bishop must have been to submit a request to the Pope asking to move the seat (Latin: cathedra) of the bishopric from Spynie to Elgin, for on 10 April 1224, the Pope sent Andreas his permission. Andreas' greatest legacy would be Elgin Cathedral, where all medieval bishops of Moray would have their cathedral (although the bishops themselves kept Spynie Palace as their chief personal residence.) On 19 July 1224, the foundation stone of the new Elgin Cathedral was ceremoniously laid with completion sometime after 1242. Andreas, as head of one of Scotland's more important bishoprics, also played a role in Scotland's larger political and religious life. For instance, he witnessed charters of king Alexander II and was the principal consecrator of William de Bondington as Bishop of Glasgow.

A letter from Pope Gregory IX, dated to 13 April 1231, instructs the dean and chapter of Moray that elections to the bishopric should be free. This suggests that the clergy of Moray had some reason to fear Bishop Andreas death, and that perhaps Andreas was ill. No death occurred for another decade, because the bishop died late in the year 1242. He was buried in the south side of the choir under a large blue marble stone.

== Notes ==
Religious titles
| Preceded by Reinald Macer | Bishop of Ross elect 1213 | Succeeded by Robert Capellanus |
| Preceded by Bricius | Bishop of Moray; 1222/4–1242 | Succeeded by Simon de Gunby |
