= Richard de Lincoln =

Anglo-Norman prelate

Richard de Lincoln was a medieval Anglo-Norman prelate. Although of English origin, he was a royal clerk in the administration of King William of Scotland. With royal support, he was elected Bishop of Moray on 1 March 1187 and was consecrated at St Andrews on 15 March by Bishop Hugh. His appointment during the rebellion of Donald MacWilliam in the north was to a dilapidated diocese. Only after MacWilliam's defeat in July could Bishop Richard begin the strengthening of his see. His episcopate marked an increase in royal patronage directed at the diocese of Moray. He witnessed many charters during his episcopate. He died in 1203, and was succeeded by Bricius de Douglas.

Religious titles
Preceded by Simon de Tosny	Bishop of Moray; 1187–1203	Succeeded by Bricius de Douglas
