= Gregoir of Moray =

Scottish bishop

Gregoir of Moray [Giric, Gregory] is the first attested Bishop of Moray. His name (with his See) occur in witness lists in two charters.

The first is the witness list appended to a charter of King Alexander I of Scotland defining the legal powers held by Priory of Scone. This charter cannot date to before the year 1123/1124 - because another of the witnesses is "Robert, Bishop Elect of St. Andrews". - but may in fact date to the year 1114. The second dates to 1128, and is a confirmation by King David I of Scotland of the rights held by the church of Dunfermline.

The name "Bishop Gregoir" (without See) also occurs in the foundation charter of Scone Priory. This charter was dated by Sir Archibald Lawrie to 1120, but there is good evidence to believe that the foundation of Scone may have happened as early as 1114. Gregoir, Bishop of Moray, is the most likely candidate for the "Bishop Gregoir" of the charter because he is chronologically the closest Gregoir otherwise known, and because Gregoir of Moray explicitly witnessed a later Scone-related charter.

== Notes ==
Religious titles
| Preceded by ? | Bishop of Moray fl. x1114–1128x | Succeeded by William |
