= Diocese of Moray =

Medieval Roman Catholic diocese in Scotland

Coordinates: 57.360°N 3.783°W

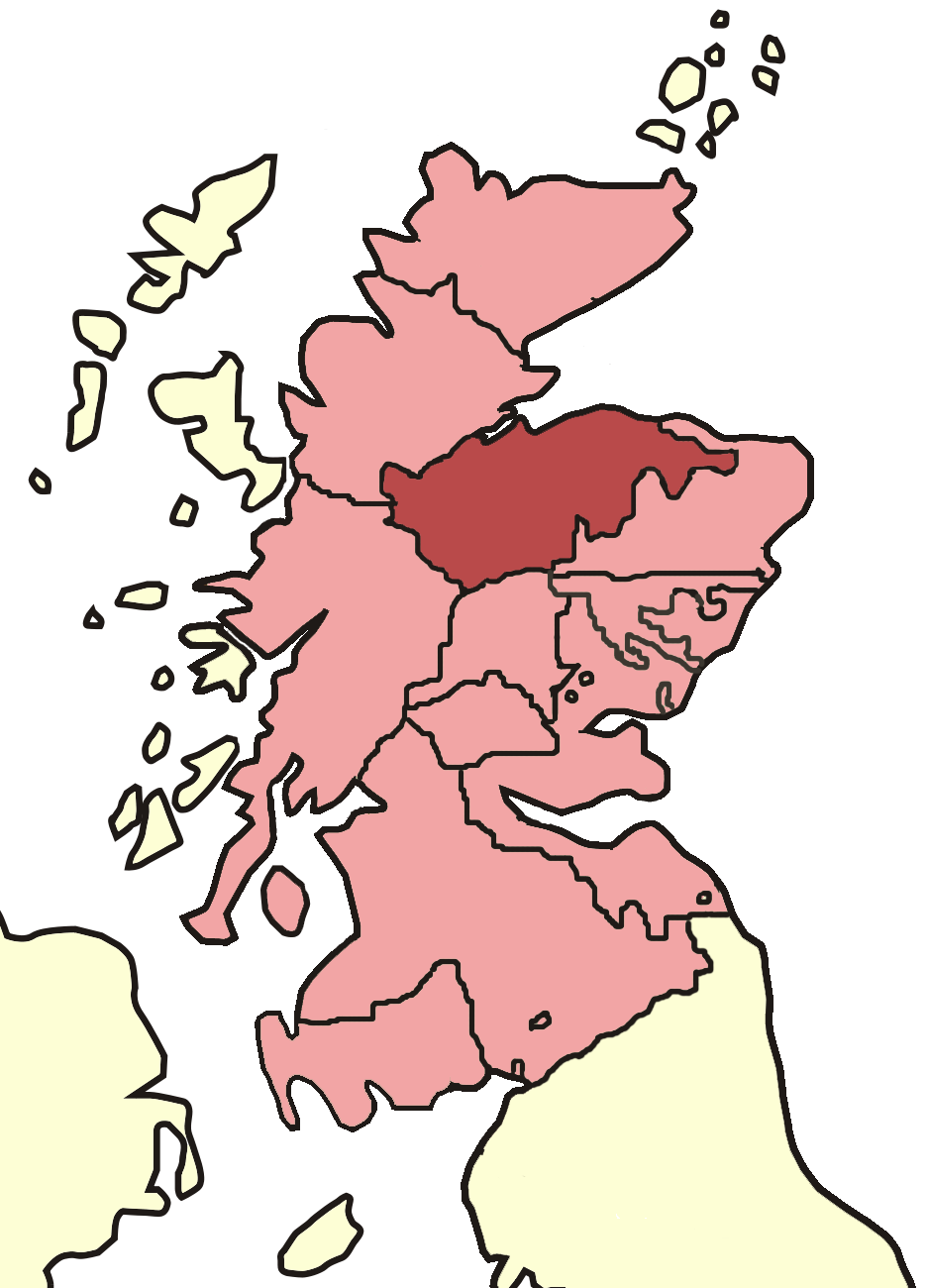
- Head: Bishop of Moray
- Archdeacon(s): Archdeacon of Moray
- Known rural deans: Elgin, Inverness, Strathbogie, Strathspey
- First attestation: 1114 x 1120
- Metropolitan before 1472: None
- Metropolitan after 1492: Archbishop of St Andrews
- Cathedral: Elgin Cathedral
- Previous cathedral(s): Birnie, Kinneddar and Spynie
- Dedication: Holy Trinity
- Canons: Secular
- Catholic successor: Merged into resurrected Diocese of Aberdeen, 4 March 1878
- Episcopal successor: Diocese of Moray, Ross and Caithness

The Diocese of Moray was one of the most important of the medieval dioceses of the Roman Catholic Church in Scotland. Its territory was in central northern Scotland.

== History ==
It was founded in the early years of the 12th century by David I of Scotland under its first bishop, Gregoir. It was suppressed in 1638 and never revived as a titular see.

=== Bishops of Moray ===
Bishop Bricius organised the constitution of the church, but it was Bishop Andreas who increased the number of dignitaries and prebend canons and was responsible for gaining large grants of land from his kinsmen, the powerful de Moravia lords, as well as from the king. In the year of his death, Andreas changed the cathedral's constitution to mirror that of Salisbury.

Other bishops made a lasting impact on the diocese; probably the most important of these was Alexander Bur (1362–1397), who championed the right of the Moray church to retain its property against a ruthless magnate, Alexander Stewart, Earl of Buchan, called the "Wolf of Badenoch".

Apparently the see served repeatedly as a stepping stone:

- Bishop Henry de Lichton (18 May 1414 – April 1422) went on to become bishop of Aberdeen
- Andrew Forman (26 November 1501 – 1514) became Metropolitan Archbishop, first of Bourges (France) (15 July 1513 – 1514), then of St Andrews (1514 – 11 March 1521)

The last of the Roman Catholic bishops was Patrick Hepburn, who alienated almost all of the lands pertaining to the church at the time of the Scottish Reformation.

=== Other officials ===
In the Scottish Episcopal Church, Charles Fyvie (of Inverness) was Dean of the United Diocese of Moray, Ross and Argyle in 1846 until the dioceses were reconfigured, then Dean of Moray and Ross until 1849, when he was succeeded by William C. A. Maclaurin (of Elgin).

== Extent and deaneries ==
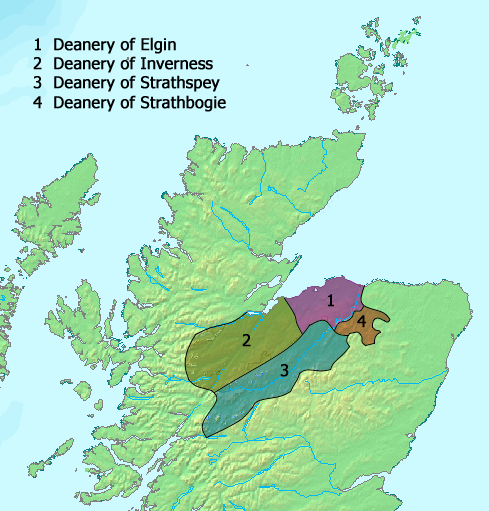
The deaneries of Moray and parishes

The diocese covered a large area extending from Huntly in the east, within a few miles of the Knoydart Peninsula in the west and, in the south-west, to the Atlantic Ocean at an inlet of Loch Linnhe in Lochaber.

It was divided into the four deaneries of Elgin, Inverness, Strathbogie and Strathspey. Each of these deaneries contained a number of parishes that provided the mensal and prebendal means for the church.

=== Elgin ===
- Altyre
- Alves
- Auldearn
- Birnie
- Dallas
- Dipple
- Duffus
- Dundurkas
- Dyke
- Elgin
- Elchies
- Essil
- Forres
- Fothervays—now Edinkillie
- Kinneddar
- Lhanbryde
- Logie Fythenach—now Ardclach
- Moy
- Ogstoun
- Rafford
- Rothes
- Spynie
- Urquhart

=== Inverness ===
- Abertarff
- Abriachan
- Brackley—now Brackla
- Convinth
- Croy
- Dalarossie
- Dalcross
- Daviot
- Dores
- Ewan or Barevan—now Cawdor
- Ferneway
- Inverness
- Kintallirgy—now Kiltarlity
- Lunnin—now Moy
- Lundechty—now Dunlichity
- Petty
- Urquhart
- Wardlaw—now Kirkhill

=== Strathspey ===
- Abernethy
- Advie
- Alvie
- Cromdale
- Duthil
- Insh
- Inverallan
- Inveravon
- Kincardine
- Kingussie
- Logie Kenny—now Laggan
- Rothiemurcus

=== Strathbogie ===
- Aberchirder—now Marnoch
- Aberlour
- Arndilly—now Boharm
- Botary
- Botriphnie
- Drumdelgie
- Dunbennan
- Edendiack
- Essie
- Grantully—now Gartly
- Glass
- Inverkethney
- Keith
- Kinnoir
- Rothiemay
- Ruthven
- Rhynie

== Cathedrals ==
The early Moray bishops did not have a fixed seat but took their cathedrals to the culdee centres at Birnie, Kinneddar and lastly Spynie.

=== Spynie Cathedral ===
Bishop Bricius de Douglas finally obtained permission from Pope Innocent III on 7 April 1206 to fix the cathedral at the Church of the Holy Trinity at Spynie.

Authorisation was also granted to create a chapter of eight canons to administer the cathedral. The chapter based its constitution on that of Lincoln Cathedral. It is possible that this decision may have been influenced by the fact that Bricius' immediate predecessor was Bishop Richard de Lincoln.

=== Elgin Cathedral ===
Bricius saw that Spynie was too remote from those it sought to serve; to ensure the safety of the clergy, he petitioned the pope to allow the church to be moved to the relative safety of Elgin. It was not until after his death, however, that this was achieved under the episcopate of Bishop Andreas de Moravia, and with the authority of Pope Honorius III and King Alexander II on 19 July 1224.

== Sources and references ==
- GigaCatholic, with three incembeut bishop biography links
