= Birnie Kirk =

Church in Moray, Scotland

Coordinates: 57°36′41″N 3°19′48″W

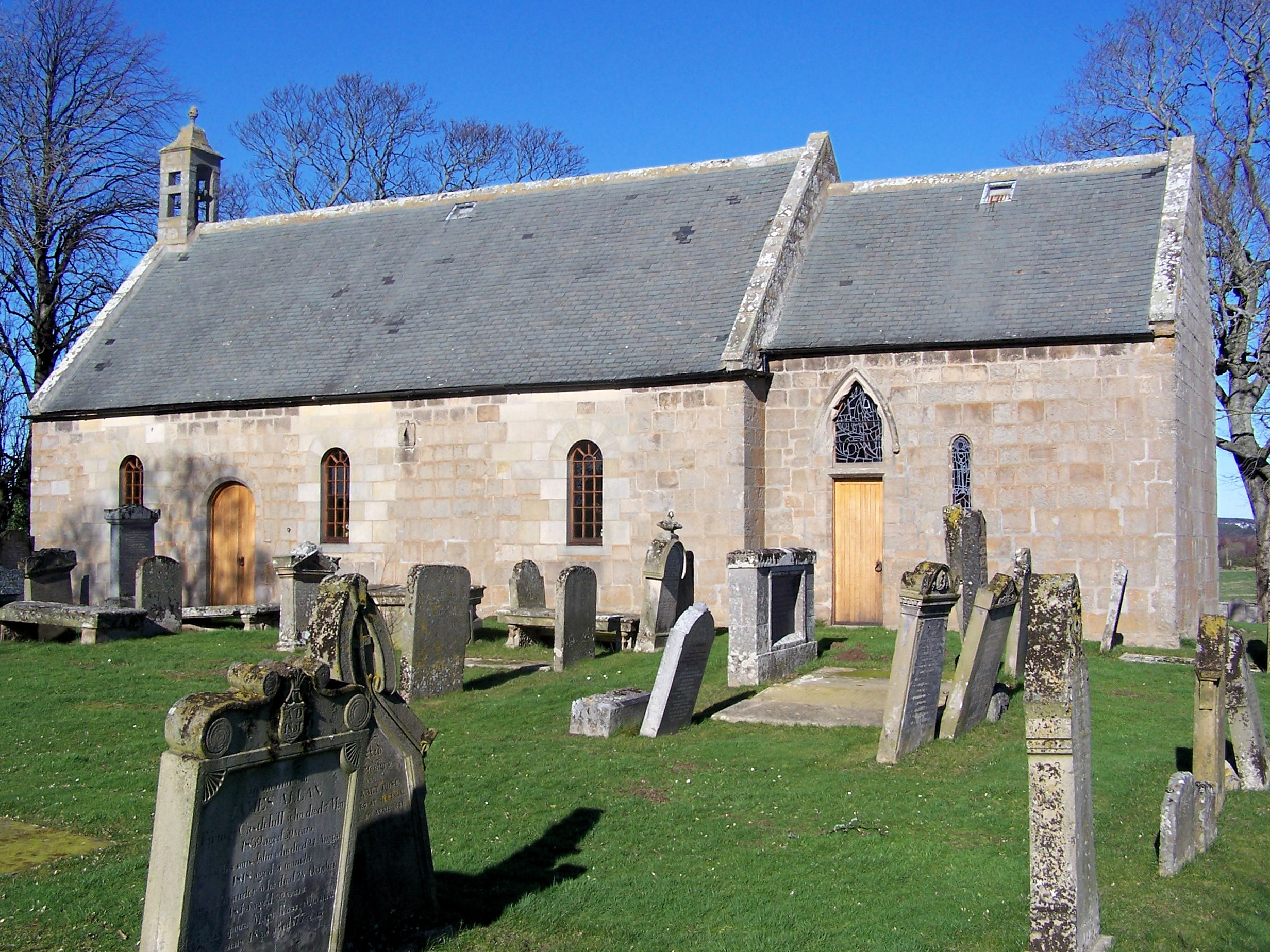
Birnie Kirk, the first Cathedral Church of Moray, built c. 1140

Birnie Kirk is a 12th century parish church located near Elgin, in Moray, Scotland. It was the first cathedral of the Bishop of Moray and is one of the oldest in Scotland to have been in continuous use. The graveyard, symbol stone and archaeological remains under the church have been designated a scheduled monument by Historic Environment Scotland.

BBC News reported on 22 November 2023 that "the 12th Century building is due to close by 2027, as the Church of Scotland undergoes what has been described as 'radical reform' amid falling congregations. The building will continue to be maintained by the Kirk Session pending its release, a Church of Scotland spokesman said in a statement."

== Description ==
Birnie Parish Kirk is a rare 12th century Norman parish church located 4 km south of Elgin, in Moray, Scotland. Birnie is one of the oldest churches in continual use in Moray. It is thought that the Norman building was built to replace an earlier, 6th century, Celtic kirk. The presence of a Pictish symbol stone suggests Birnie had been a pre-Christian holy site from very much earlier. It is constructed of aislar (ashlar), a finely cut freestone. The building is rectangular with a square, short chancel, which is separated from the nave by a rounded Norman chancel arch. The nave was shortened in 1734 when the wall was rebuilt, and the kirk was later restored in 1891. In the chancel is what is believed to be a Celtic bell, said to have been made in Rome and blessed by the then pope. There is also a 17th century bible, covered in calf's fur - locally known as the Hairy Bible. In the corner of the nave stands a plain, Romanesque style font. The church contains lancet windows in the north and south.

The kirk was the seat of the Bishops of Moray from 1107 to 1184. Until 1322 when the seat moved to Elgin, it served as a cathedral, the seat being rotated between Birnie, Kinneddar, and Spynie. Simon de Tonei, the fourth bishop, was interred there in 1184 but the grave is no longer identifiable.

The kirk is surrounded by an oval burial enclosure, which suggests an earlier medieval site. The wall on the north side of the enclosure was removed in the past in order to extend the cemetery. The Birnie Symbol Stone, a Class I Pictish symbol stone, stands against the west wall in the enclosure. It is made of granite, is 1.07 m (3 ft 6 in) in height, 0.6 m (2 ft 0 in)0.6m thick and narrows toward the top. A Celtic decoration of a sea-lion, a Z-rod and a rectangular device is incised into the north side of the stone. The cemetery also contains a war memorial honouring local parishioners who died during World War I and World War II. The memorial, designed to look like the gable end of a chapel, contains two inlaid plaques which lie below a Romanesque arch.

== History ==
Before the construction of Birnie, the site was known to have been the original seat of the Bishops of Moray. Simon de Tosnay, the fourth bishop, was buried in the church in 1184. Birnie was a commune kirk of the Cathedral of Elgin. There are no remnants of the earlier church, but the oval churchyard suggests the shape of am early Christian enclosure. The graveyard was designated a scheduled monument by Historic Environment Scotland. in 1969. The church was listed in 1971 as a category A building. In 1997, the scheduled monument was updated to include the symbol stone located within the burial enclosure and the archaeological remains lying under the church. The church closed for regular worship following a final, thanksgiving service on Sunday 19 November 2023. By agreement with Elgin Kirk Session, since January 2024 it has been used by the Roman Catholic Church's Personal Ordinariate of Our Lady of Walsingham for weekly Evening Prayer and monthly Mass.

== See also ==
- Kilbirnie Auld Kirk
- Culdees
