= List of listed buildings in Elgin, Moray =

This is a list of listed buildings in the parish of Elgin in Moray, Scotland.

== List ==
Name	Location	Date listed	Grid ref. (Note: Sometimes known as OSGB36, the grid reference (where provided) is based on the British national grid reference system used by the Ordnance Survey. • "Guide to National Grid". Ordnance Survey. • "Get-a-map". Ordnance Survey.)	Geo-coordinates	Notes	LB number (Note: Historic Environment Scotland assign a unique alphanumeric identifier to each designated site in Scotland, for listed buildings this always begins with "LB", for example "LB12345".)	Image
3 Reidhaven Street				57°38′48″N 3°18′50″W	Category B	30868	Upload Photo
19 Reidhaven Street				57°38′44″N 3°18′46″W	Category C(S)	30872	Upload Photo
23 Reidhaven Street				57°38′43″N 3°18′45″W	Category B	30874	Upload Photo
47 Reidhaven Street				57°38′38″N 3°18′39″W	Category C(S)	30880	Upload Photo
16 Harrow Inn Close				57°38′52″N 3°18′55″W	Category C(S)	30885	Upload Photo
64-102 Even Nos Only South College Street (Even Numbers Only)				57°38′54″N 3°18′15″W	Category B	30893	Upload Photo
13 South Guildry Street				57°38′44″N 3°18′51″W	Category B	30896	Upload Photo
7 West Road				57°38′48″N 3°19′39″W	Category C(S)	30913	Upload Photo
17 West Road				57°38′49″N 3°19′46″W	Category C(S)	30915	Upload Photo
19 West Road, Craigie				57°38′49″N 3°19′47″W	Category B	30916	Upload Photo
147-149 High Street				57°38′56″N 3°18′58″W	Category B	30752	Upload Photo
171-177 (Odd Nos) High Street				57°38′55″N 3°19′02″W	Category C(S)	30755	Upload Photo
227B High Street (In Close)				57°38′54″N 3°19′11″W	Category B	30765	Upload Photo
82, 84, 86 High Street				57°38′55″N 3°18′52″W	Category B	30785	Upload Photo
114A High Street (Through Pend, Harrow Inn Close)				57°38′54″N 3°18′57″W	Category C(S)	30792	Upload Photo
14, 15 Harrow Inn Close				57°38′53″N 3°18′56″W	Category C(S)	30797	Upload Photo
1 King Street, Winchester House And Garden Walls				57°38′59″N 3°18′24″W	Category B	30813	Upload Photo
7 King Street				57°38′58″N 3°18′24″W	Category C(S)	30814	Upload Photo
13 And 15 King Street				57°38′57″N 3°18′23″W	Category C(S)	30816	Upload Photo
Maisondieu Road, Railway Station (Formerly Great North Of Scotland Railway)				57°38′36″N 3°18′27″W	Category B	30825	Upload another image See more images
50 Moss Street				57°38′44″N 3°18′37″W	Category B	30835	Upload Photo
Abbey Street, Convent Of Mercy, Chapel				57°38′53″N 3°18′34″W	Category A	30681	Upload another image
1-55 (Odd Nos) Harrison Terrace				57°39′27″N 3°19′01″W	Category B	30693	Upload Photo
Deanshaugh, Deansburgh House And Outbuilding				57°39′16″N 3°18′29″W	Category B	30702	Upload Photo
8, 10 Forteath Avenue With Garden Walls				57°38′39″N 3°19′17″W	Category B	30705	Upload Photo
5A High Street (Through Pend)				57°38′57″N 3°18′37″W	Category B	30716	Upload another image
5D High Street (Through Pend)				57°38′57″N 3°18′37″W	Category C(S)	30719	Upload Photo
7 High Street, Braco's Banking House				57°38′56″N 3°18′37″W	Category A	30720	Upload another image See more images
23 High Street				57°38′56″N 3°18′40″W	Category B	30723	Upload Photo
25B High Street (Through Pend)				57°38′57″N 3°18′41″W	Category B	30729	Upload Photo
87C, D High Street (Through Pend)				57°38′57″N 3°18′51″W	Category C(S)	30735	Upload Photo
91A High Street (Through Pend)				57°38′57″N 3°18′51″W	Category C(S)	30736	Upload Photo
103-107 High Street, The Tower Hotel				57°38′57″N 3°18′53″W	Category B	30744	Upload another image
135-139 High Street				57°38′57″N 3°18′58″W	Category C(S)	30750	Upload Photo
Pittendreich Dovecot				57°38′03″N 3°20′55″W	Category A	8439	Upload Photo
17 Batchen Street				57°38′53″N 3°19′01″W	Category C(S)	43372	Upload Photo
39-45 (Odd Nos) Reidhaven Street				57°38′39″N 3°18′40″W	Category B	30879	Upload Photo
Northfield Terrace, Highfield House And Former Carriage House, Elgin Community Surgery				57°38′49″N 3°19′12″W	Category B	30888	Upload Photo
South Street, High Church (Church Of Scotland)				57°38′49″N 3°18′57″W	Category B	30890	Upload Photo
56-58 South Street				57°38′51″N 3°18′58″W	Category B	30892	Upload Photo
229F High Street(Through Pend)				57°38′54″N 3°19′12″W	Category C(S)	30768	Upload Photo
233 And 235 High Street				57°38′53″N 3°19′12″W	Category C(S)	30770	Upload Photo
233C, D High Street (Through Pend)				57°38′54″N 3°19′12″W	Category C(S)	30772	Upload Photo
239 High Street				57°38′53″N 3°19′12″W	Category C(S)	30774	Upload Photo
102, 104, 106, 108 High Street				57°38′55″N 3°18′55″W	Category C(S)	30789	Upload Photo
128, 130, 132, 134, 136 High Street				57°38′54″N 3°18′59″W	Category B	30799	Upload Photo
21 Institution Road, Moray Bank				57°38′48″N 3°18′39″W	Category B	30807	Upload Photo
17 King Street				57°38′57″N 3°18′23″W	Category C(S)	30817	Upload Photo
10 King Street				57°38′58″N 3°18′22″W	Category B	30819	Upload Photo
16, 18 And 18A King Street				57°38′57″N 3°18′22″W	Category C(S)	30820	Upload Photo
9A Moss Street, High Spirits, Formerly Moss Street United Presbyterian Church				57°38′52″N 3°18′47″W	Category C(S)	30837	Upload Photo
Newmill Garvald House, Walling, Gate Piers And Pedestrian Entrance				57°39′05″N 3°18′01″W	Category C(S)	30846	Upload Photo
Trinity Place, Holy Trinity Episcopal Church				57°39′01″N 3°19′04″W	Category B	30848	Upload Photo
Trinity Place, Holy Trinity Church Hall (Formerly School)				57°39′01″N 3°19′04″W	Category C(S)	30849	Upload Photo
North College Street, Elgin Cathedral Enclosing Wall And Gates				57°39′02″N 3°18′20″W	Category A	30853	Upload Photo
North College Street, Elgin Cathedral "Bishop's House"				57°39′04″N 3°18′24″W	Category A	30854	Upload another image
13 North College Street, "Downham"				57°38′58″N 3°18′31″W	Category C(S)	30857	Upload Photo
Old Mills Road, Bridge Approaching The Mill And Ancillary Buildings				57°38′58″N 3°19′52″W	Category C(S)	30861	Upload Photo
33 Abbey Street, Heatherley				57°38′48″N 3°18′34″W	Category C(S)	30683	Upload Photo
Bishopmill, 1 Bridge Street				57°39′10″N 3°18′55″W	Category C(S)	30687	Upload Photo
Blackfriars Road, Lodge To Mansion House Hotel (Formerly The Haugh)				57°38′57″N 3°19′21″W	Category C(S)	30699	Upload Photo
High Street, Little Cross				57°38′56″N 3°18′36″W	Category A	30709	Upload another image See more images
3 High Street				57°38′56″N 3°18′37″W	Category C(S)	30715	Upload another image
25 High Street				57°38′56″N 3°18′41″W	Category B	30727	Upload Photo
25A High Street				57°38′57″N 3°18′41″W	Category B	30728	Upload Photo
37F High Street, (Through Pend)				57°38′57″N 3°18′42″W	Category C(S)	30731	Upload Photo
87A High Street (Through Pend)				57°38′57″N 3°18′51″W	Category C(S)	30733	Upload Photo
91C, D High Street (Through Pend)				57°38′58″N 3°18′52″W	Category C(S)	30738	Upload Photo
Pend At Rear Of 95 High Street E-F				57°38′57″N 3°18′52″W	Category C(S)	30741	Upload Photo
Coleburn Distillery, Duty Free 553 Warehouses, Office, Store, Cottage And Manager's House				57°34′54″N 3°16′19″W	Category B	8435	Upload Photo
Pluscarden, Netherbyre				57°36′11″N 3°25′19″W	Category C(S)	8445	Upload Photo
Elgin Town Hall, Including Former Water Feature And Flagpoles				57°39′02″N 3°18′58″W	Category B	47391	Upload another image See more images
Pluscarden Road, Lodge To Gray's Hospital				57°38′44″N 3°19′41″W	Category B	30865	Upload Photo
11 Reidhaven Street				57°38′46″N 3°18′49″W	Category C(S)	30869	Upload Photo
21 Reidhaven Street				57°38′44″N 3°18′46″W	Category C(S)	30873	Upload Photo
49 Reidhaven Street				57°38′37″N 3°18′38″W	Category B	30881	Upload Photo
3-17 (Odd Nos) Victoria Road, Jubilee Homes (Odd Number Only)				57°38′49″N 3°18′03″W	Category C(S)	30909	Upload Photo
3 West Road				57°38′48″N 3°19′37″W	Category C(S)	30911	Upload Photo
West Road, Connet Hill				57°38′51″N 3°20′13″W	Category B	30917	Upload Photo
Northfield Terrace, St Michael's (Former Episcopalian) Rectory With Garden Walls				57°38′49″N 3°19′09″W	Category B	30921	Upload Photo
161-163 High Street				57°38′55″N 3°19′01″W	Category B	30753	Upload Photo
185 High Street				57°38′55″N 3°19′04″W	Category C(S)	30757	Upload Photo
211E High Street (In Close)				57°38′55″N 3°19′09″W	Category C(S)	30763	Upload Photo
229G High Street(Throiugh Pend)				57°38′55″N 3°19′12″W	Category C(S)	30769	Upload Photo
76, 78, 80 High Street				57°38′55″N 3°18′51″W	Category B	30784	Upload Photo
94 High Street				57°38′55″N 3°18′53″W	Category B	30787	Upload Photo
96-98 High Street, 100 High Street				57°38′54″N 3°18′54″W	Category B	30788	Upload Photo
3, 4, 5, 6 Harrow Inn Close				57°38′54″N 3°18′56″W	Category C(S)	30793	Upload Photo
184, 186, 188 High Street				57°38′53″N 3°19′08″W	Category B	30801	Upload Photo
Institution Road, East End School				57°38′35″N 3°18′18″W	Category B	30811	Upload Photo
27 Moray Street With 14 And 16 North Guildry Street				57°38′47″N 3°18′55″W	Category C(S)	30832	Upload Photo
41 Moss Street, South Villa, Garden Walls And Ice House				57°38′42″N 3°18′41″W	Category A	30839	Upload Photo
Newmill, Newmill Warehouse Front Block				57°39′06″N 3°17′58″W	Category B	30842	Upload Photo
Newmill, Newmill Warehouse And Weaving Shed				57°39′06″N 3°17′58″W	Category C(S)	30843	Upload Photo
Newmill, Newmill Cottages (Formerly Newmill House Stables)				57°39′06″N 3°18′00″W	Category C(S)	30845	Upload Photo
Old Mills Road, The Mill And Ancillary Working Buildings				57°39′00″N 3°19′54″W	Category B	30860	Upload another image See more images
Bishopmill, Braemoriston Road, Braemoriston House				57°39′15″N 3°19′17″W	Category B	30685	Upload Photo
Bishopmill, Woodlands Farm, Horse Engine House				57°39′33″N 3°19′31″W	Category B	30697	Upload Photo
High Street, Fountain On The Plainstones				57°38′55″N 3°18′59″W	Category B	30710	Upload another image See more images
15 And 17 High Street, Masonic Building				57°38′56″N 3°18′39″W	Category B	30722	Upload another image
85,87,89,91,93 High Street				57°38′56″N 3°18′50″W	Category C(S)	30732	Upload Photo
91E And 91F High Street (Through Pend)				57°38′58″N 3°18′52″W	Category C(S)	30739	Upload Photo
109 High Street				57°38′57″N 3°18′53″W	Category C(S)	30745	Upload Photo
Cowiesburn House (Former Free Church Manse)				57°35′52″N 3°25′36″W	Category B	8436	Upload Photo
Pittendreich Bridge (Over Lochty Burn)				57°38′14″N 3°20′51″W	Category B	8440	Upload Photo
Pluscarden Abbey, and Monastic Buildings, excluding Scheduled Monument No 2144 'Pluscarden Priory, precinct walls'				57°36′00″N 3°26′09″W	Category A	8441	Upload another image See more images
284 High Street, Fern Hurst, Former Civic Lamps				57°38′47″N 3°19′31″W	Category C(S)	45660	Upload Photo
6 Queen Street, Greyfriars House				57°38′52″N 3°18′24″W	Category B	30867	Upload Photo
29 Reidhaven Street				57°38′41″N 3°18′43″W	Category C(S)	30876	Upload Photo
31 Reidhaven Street				57°38′40″N 3°18′42″W	Category C(S)	30877	Upload Photo
3,4 St Catherine's Place And Garden Walls				57°38′38″N 3°19′16″W	Category B	30883	Upload Photo
Sheriffmills Bridge				57°38′56″N 3°20′23″W	Category B	30884	Upload Photo
3 South College Street				57°38′55″N 3°18′35″W	Category C(S)	30894	Upload Photo
15 South Guildry Street				57°38′43″N 3°18′51″W	Category C(S)	30897	Upload Photo
25 And 29 South Guildry Street				57°38′41″N 3°18′49″W	Category C(S)	30899	Upload Photo
5 West Road				57°38′48″N 3°19′38″W	Category C(S)	30912	Upload Photo
9 West Road, Ingleside (Formerly The Cottage)				57°38′49″N 3°19′42″W	Category A	30914	Upload Photo
211, 211A And 211B High Street				57°38′54″N 3°19′08″W	Category C(S)	30760	Upload Photo
233A, B High Street, (Through Pend)				57°38′53″N 3°19′12″W	Category C(S)	30771	Upload Photo
233E And 233F High Street, (Through Pend)				57°38′54″N 3°19′12″W	Category C(S)	30773	Upload Photo
High Street, Lady Hill, Duke Of Gordon Monument				57°38′54″N 3°19′21″W	Category A	30775	Upload another image See more images
92 High Street (Through Pend)				57°38′54″N 3°18′53″W	Category C(S)	30786	Upload Photo
116-126 High Street (Former Gordon Arms Hotel)				57°38′54″N 3°18′57″W	Category C(S)	30798	Upload Photo
20 King Street				57°38′56″N 3°18′21″W	Category B	30821	Upload Photo
2 Mayne Road, The Mansefield House Hotel				57°38′47″N 3°19′12″W	Category B	30828	Upload Photo
North College Street, Grant Lodge (Elgin Library)				57°39′02″N 3°18′36″W	Category B	30851	Upload another image
Abbey Street, Convent Of Mercy, Convent Buildings				57°38′52″N 3°18′34″W	Category A	30682	Upload Photo
Bishopmill, 3 Bridge Street				57°39′11″N 3°18′56″W	Category C(S)	30688	Upload Photo
Bishopmill, 2 Bridge Street				57°39′10″N 3°18′57″W	Category C(S)	30689	Upload Photo
Bishopmill, East High Street, Deansford				57°39′19″N 3°18′49″W	Category B	30692	Upload Photo
Bishopmill, 21 West High Street, Montpelier				57°39′15″N 3°19′06″W	Category C(S)	30695	Upload Photo
Bishopmill, Hythe Hill, 23 West High Street, House, Gatepiers, Garden Walling, Former Gighouse And Stable				57°39′15″N 3°19′08″W	Category B	30696	Upload Photo
20 Duff Avenue, The Lodge				57°38′41″N 3°18′23″W	Category B	30704	Upload Photo
5B High Street (Through Pend)				57°38′57″N 3°18′37″W	Category B	30717	Upload Photo
87B High Street (Through Pend)				57°38′57″N 3°18′51″W	Category C(S)	30734	Upload Photo
101 High Street				57°38′56″N 3°18′52″W	Category B	30742	Upload Photo
141-145 High Street				57°38′56″N 3°18′58″W	Category B	30751	Upload Photo
Clackmarras, Thornhill				57°36′41″N 3°15′00″W	Category C(S)	8434	Upload Photo
13 Reidhaven Street				57°38′46″N 3°18′48″W	Category B	30870	Upload Photo
South Street, Park House (Centre)				57°38′45″N 3°19′28″W	Category B	30889	Upload Photo
South College Street, Anderson's Institution And Gatepiers (The Elgin Institution For Support Of Old Age And Education Of Youth				57°38′53″N 3°18′17″W	Category A	30895	Upload another image
55, 57 South Guildry Street				57°38′39″N 3°18′46″W	Category C(S)	30901	Upload Photo
22, 22A, 24, 24A South Guildry Street				57°38′41″N 3°18′51″W	Category C(S)	30903	Upload Photo
31 Wittet Drive				57°38′40″N 3°19′58″W	Category B	30919	Upload Photo
1 High Street, K6 Telephone Kiosk At Museum				57°38′57″N 3°18′35″W	Category B	30920	Upload Photo
181 High Street				57°38′55″N 3°19′03″W	Category C(S)	30756	Upload Photo
211C High Street (In Close)				57°38′55″N 3°19′09″W	Category C(S)	30761	Upload Photo
211F High Street (In Close)				57°38′56″N 3°19′09″W	Category C(S)	30764	Upload Photo
227C High Street (In Close)				57°38′54″N 3°19′11″W	Category C(S)	30766	Upload Photo
High Street, Maryhill House, Garden Walls And Bridge Linking Gardens And Spanning The Ladies Walk, Oldmills Road				57°38′49″N 3°19′35″W	Category B	30777	Upload Photo
42-46 High Street				57°38′56″N 3°18′46″W	Category A	30779	Upload Photo
50-52 High Street				57°38′56″N 3°18′47″W	Category A	30780	Upload Photo
54 High Street				57°38′56″N 3°18′48″W	Category B	30781	Upload another image
7, 8, 9, 10 Harrow Inn Close				57°38′53″N 3°18′56″W	Category C(S)	30794	Upload Photo
11, 13 Harrow Inn Close				57°38′53″N 3°18′56″W	Category C(S)	30795	Upload Photo
184A, B, C High Street (Through Pend)				57°38′52″N 3°19′07″W	Category C(S)	30802	Upload Photo
Institution Road, St Sylvester's Rc Church, Presbytery And School				57°38′48″N 3°18′38″W	Category B	30806	Upload Photo
Institution Road, Lodge To Anderson's Institution				57°38′52″N 3°18′22″W	Category B	30812	Upload Photo
Maisondieu Road, Laich Moray Hotel (Formerly Station Hotel)				57°38′38″N 3°18′29″W	Category B	30824	Upload Photo
Maisondieu Road, Railway Station, Engine Shed				57°38′43″N 3°17′55″W	Category B	30826	Upload Photo
7 Mayne Road, Prospect Lodge				57°38′45″N 3°19′18″W	Category B	30827	Upload Photo
Moray Street, Moray College Of Further Education (Former Elgin Academy) Fronting Moray Street, Arch And Bellcote				57°38′44″N 3°19′00″W	Category B	30830	Upload another image
35 Moss Street, Girnigoe				57°38′45″N 3°18′41″W	Category B	30838	Upload Photo
1 North College Street				57°38′56″N 3°18′35″W	Category B	30850	Upload Photo
1, 3 Duff Avenue, Avenue House				57°38′46″N 3°18′37″W	Category B	30703	Upload Photo
26 Hay Street, Former South Manse				57°38′44″N 3°19′05″W	Category B	30707	Upload Photo
High Street, War Memorial, On The Plainstones				57°38′55″N 3°18′58″W	Category C(S)	30711	Upload another image See more images
111-113 High Street				57°38′56″N 3°18′54″W	Category C(S)	30746	Upload Photo
117, 119 And 121 High Street				57°38′56″N 3°18′55″W	Category C(S)	30748	Upload Photo
Miltonduff Dovecot				57°37′29″N 3°22′27″W	Category C(S)	8438	Upload another image
Pluscarden Abbey, Porter's Lodge				57°35′58″N 3°25′59″W	Category B	8442	Upload another image
Pansport Road, Pansport And Precinct Wall				57°39′00″N 3°18′11″W	Category A	30863	Upload another image
62 Pluscarden Road, Fleurs House				57°38′39″N 3°20′02″W	Category C(S)	30866	Upload Photo
17 Reidhaven Street				57°38′45″N 3°18′47″W	Category B	30871	Upload Photo
33 Reidhaven Street				57°38′39″N 3°18′41″W	Category C(S)	30878	Upload Photo
69-71 South Street				57°38′51″N 3°18′59″W	Category C(S)	30887	Upload Photo
South Street, Free Church				57°38′50″N 3°19′02″W	Category C(S)	30891	Upload Photo
49, 51, 53 South Guildry Street				57°38′39″N 3°18′47″W	Category C(S)	30900	Upload Photo
26, 28 South Guildry Street				57°38′41″N 3°18′51″W	Category B	30904	Upload Photo
165-167 High Street				57°38′55″N 3°19′01″W	Category B	30754	Upload Photo
High Street, Sulva Cottage And Messines Cottage, Lady Hill. (War Veterans' Cottages)				57°38′52″N 3°19′18″W	Category C(S)	30776	Upload another image
114 High Street (Through Pend, Harrow Inn Close)				57°38′54″N 3°18′57″W	Category C(S)	30791	Upload Photo
Hill Street, Ladyhill House Hotel				57°38′52″N 3°19′22″W	Category B	30803	Upload Photo
23 Institution Road, Kinrara				57°38′48″N 3°18′40″W	Category B	30808	Upload Photo
8 Institution Road, Limuru				57°38′50″N 3°18′26″W	Category B	30810	Upload Photo
Lesmurdie, Lesmurdie House				57°39′22″N 3°17′56″W	Category B	30822	Upload Photo
Moray Street, South High Church, (Church Of Scotland)				57°38′46″N 3°18′54″W	Category B	30831	Upload Photo
42-46 Moss Street				57°38′45″N 3°18′39″W	Category B	30834	Upload Photo
New Elgin, Doocot Park, Dovecot				57°38′23″N 3°18′21″W	Category B	30841	Upload another image
Newmill, Newmill House				57°39′06″N 3°18′01″W	Category C(S)	30844	Upload Photo
6 Trinity Place (Former Episcopal Parsonage)				57°39′00″N 3°19′04″W	Category B	30847	Upload Photo
North College Street, Former North College Stages				57°39′04″N 3°18′18″W	Category B	30856	Upload Photo
Bishopmill, Bridge Street, Bishopmill Bridge Over River Lossie				57°39′09″N 3°18′55″W	Category B	30686	Upload another image
Bishopmill, Off Bridge Street, Ivybank, House, Garden Walling And Gatepiers				57°39′15″N 3°19′05″W	Category B	30690	Upload Photo
Bishopmill, East High Street, Millbank				57°39′17″N 3°18′56″W	Category B	30691	Upload Photo
Bishopmill, 42 North Street, Elm Bank				57°39′22″N 3°19′05″W	Category C(S)	30694	Upload Photo
40 Hay Street, Darliston, House, Stables, Former Gighouse And Garden Walls				57°38′38″N 3°18′58″W	Category B	30708	Upload Photo
25C High Street, Morlich (Through Pend)				57°38′57″N 3°18′41″W	Category B	30730	Upload Photo
115 High Street				57°38′56″N 3°18′54″W	Category B	30747	Upload Photo
Loch Na Bo Croft				57°37′09″N 3°12′32″W	Category B	8437	Upload Photo
Pluscarden Road, Gray's Hospital				57°38′45″N 3°19′43″W	Category A	30864	Upload another image See more images
27 Reidhaven Street				57°38′42″N 3°18′44″W	Category B	30875	Upload Photo
1, 2 St Catherine's Place				57°38′39″N 3°19′16″W	Category B	30882	Upload Photo
17 South Guildry Street				57°38′43″N 3°18′50″W	Category B	30898	Upload Photo
South Guildry Street, St Brendons And Ardlui				57°38′37″N 3°18′44″W	Category C(S)	30902	Upload Photo
187 High Street				57°38′55″N 3°19′04″W	Category C(S)	30758	Upload Photo
211D High Street (In Close)				57°38′55″N 3°19′09″W	Category C(S)	30762	Upload Photo
114-116 High Street				57°38′54″N 3°18′57″W	Category B	30790	Upload Photo
164, 166 High Street				57°38′53″N 3°19′05″W	Category B	30800	Upload Photo
9 Institution Road, Friars Park				57°38′51″N 3°18′27″W	Category B	30804	Upload Photo
11 Institution Road, Friars House				57°38′50″N 3°18′29″W	Category B	30805	Upload Photo
9 King Street				57°38′58″N 3°18′23″W	Category C(S)	30815	Upload Photo
Lesmurdie, Lesmurdie House, Dovecot				57°39′25″N 3°18′00″W	Category C(S)	30823	Upload another image
North College Street, North College, North College Lodge ("Tregarne"), Garden Walls And Gate Piers				57°39′06″N 3°18′26″W	Category B	30855	Upload Photo
36 Academy Street, South Bank Guest House				57°38′45″N 3°18′43″W	Category C(S)	30684	Upload Photo
Brewery Bridge				57°39′04″N 3°18′15″W	Category B	30700	Upload Photo
10 Commerce Street (The Elgin Club)				57°38′55″N 3°18′47″W	Category B	30701	Upload Photo
High Street, Muckle Cross On The Plainstones				57°38′56″N 3°18′53″W	Category B	30712	Upload another image See more images
High Street, St Giles' Church (Church Of Scotland)				57°38′55″N 3°18′56″W	Category A	30713	Upload another image See more images
1 High Street, Elgin Museum And Museum Hall				57°38′58″N 3°18′37″W	Category A	30714	Upload another image
9 High Street, St Giles				57°38′57″N 3°18′38″W	Category B	30721	Upload another image
23B High Street				57°38′57″N 3°18′40″W	Category C(S)	30725	Upload Photo
Walls To Pend Behind Nos 23 And 25 High Street				57°38′58″N 3°18′41″W	Category C(S)	30726	Upload Photo
95 High Street				57°38′57″N 3°18′52″W	Category C(S)	30740	Upload Photo
99 High Street, In Pend, Rear Wing To 101 High Street 99A, 99B And 99C				57°38′57″N 3°18′52″W	Category C(S)	30743	Upload Photo
123-133 High Street (St Giles' Building)				57°38′56″N 3°18′56″W	Category C(S)	30749	Upload Photo
Pluscarden Road, Grove Hotel				57°38′22″N 3°20′20″W	Category B	8444	Upload Photo
Old Mills Road, Old Mills House Barn				57°38′59″N 3°19′59″W	Category C(S)	30862	Upload Photo
57 South Street, Former Market Entrance (Now Your More Store)				57°38′52″N 3°18′57″W	Category C(S)	30886	Upload Photo
62, 64, 66 South Guildry Street				57°38′37″N 3°18′46″W	Category C(S)	30905	Upload Photo
68 South Guildry Street, Clifton House				57°38′37″N 3°18′46″W	Category C(S)	30906	Upload Photo
Station Road, Royal Hotel				57°38′38″N 3°18′34″W	Category B	30907	Upload Photo
Thunderton Place, Thunderton House, Adjoining Garage Wing And Low Courtyard Wall Incorporating Heraldic Beasts (Thunderton Hotel)				57°38′54″N 3°19′02″W	Category B	30908	Upload another image
2 West Road, West Lodge				57°38′47″N 3°19′37″W	Category B	30910	Upload Photo
West Road, Braelossie				57°38′53″N 3°20′10″W	Category B	30918	Upload Photo
207 High Street				57°38′54″N 3°19′06″W	Category C(S)	30759	Upload Photo
229B, C High Street (Through Pend)				57°38′54″N 3°19′12″W	Category C(S)	30767	Upload Photo
High Street (South Side) Sheriff Court				57°38′55″N 3°18′41″W	Category B	30778	Upload another image
58-62 High Street, 2 Commerce Street				57°38′56″N 3°18′48″W	Category B	30782	Upload Photo
66-68 High Street, 1 Commerce Street				57°38′55″N 3°18′50″W	Category C(S)	30783	Upload Photo
12, 13 Harrow Inn Close				57°38′53″N 3°18′56″W	Category C(S)	30796	Upload Photo
6 Institution Road, Kilmorie				57°38′50″N 3°18′24″W	Category B	30809	Upload Photo
2 King Street, Kinnore				57°39′00″N 3°18′21″W	Category B	30818	Upload Photo
4 Mayne Road, Brae Birnie				57°38′45″N 3°19′13″W	Category B	30829	Upload Photo
Moss Street, St Columba's Church Of Scotland				57°38′41″N 3°18′32″W	Category B	30833	Upload Photo
Moss Street, Eastwood				57°38′50″N 3°18′45″W	Category B	30836	Upload Photo
North College Street, Cooper Park Lodge				57°39′01″N 3°18′24″W	Category C(S)	30852	Upload Photo
North College Street, Length Of Walling Abutting North College Street And South College House To Pans Port				57°39′00″N 3°18′14″W	Category C(S)	30858	Upload Photo
Old Mills Road, Bow Bridge				57°39′08″N 3°20′11″W	Category B	30859	Upload another image See more images
Blackfriars Road, Mansion House Hotel (Formerly The Haugh)				57°39′01″N 3°19′27″W	Category B	30698	Upload another image
Gordon Street, Victoria School Of Science And Art, And Gate Piers				57°38′45″N 3°19′03″W	Category B	30706	Upload Photo
5C High Street (Through Pend)				57°38′57″N 3°18′38″W	Category C(S)	30718	Upload Photo
23A High Street (Through Pend At 25 High Street)				57°38′57″N 3°18′40″W	Category C(S)	30724	Upload Photo
91B High Street				57°38′57″N 3°18′51″W	Category C(S)	30737	Upload Photo
Blackhills House				57°36′44″N 3°13′22″W	Category B	8433	Upload Photo
Pluscarden Church (Church Of Scotland)				57°35′52″N 3°25′29″W	Category B	8443	Upload another image See more images
Wards Road, Former City Corn Mills, Including Malting Kiln				57°38′34″N 3°19′05″W	Category B	46333	Upload Photo

== Key ==
The scheme for classifying buildings in Scotland is:

- Category A: "buildings of national or international importance, either architectural or historic; or fine, little-altered examples of some particular period, style or building type."
- Category B: "buildings of regional or more than local importance; or major examples of some particular period, style or building type, which may have been altered."
- Category C: "buildings of local importance; lesser examples of any period, style, or building type, as originally constructed or moderately altered; and simple traditional buildings which group well with other listed buildings."

In March 2016 there were 47,288 listed buildings in Scotland. Of these, 8% were Category A, and 50% were Category B, with the remaining 42% being Category C.

== See also ==
- List of listed buildings in Moray
