= Elgin Town Hall =

Judicial building in Elgin, Scotland

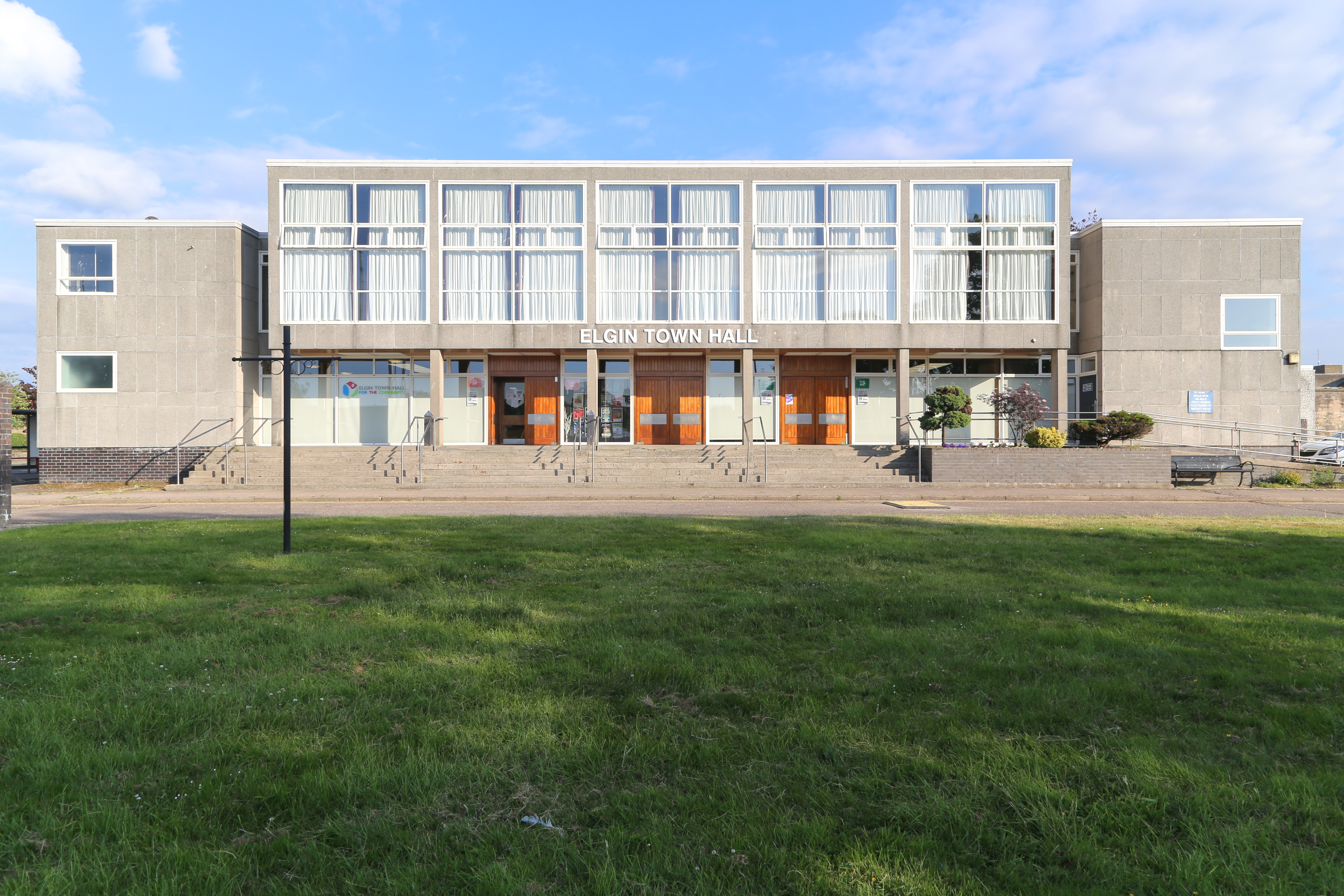
- The building in 2021

- Shown within Moray
- 57.6504°N 3.3159°W
- Location: Trinity Place, Elgin

History
- Built: 1961

Site notes
- Architect: William Kininmonth
- Architectural style: Modern style

Listed Building – Category B
- Official name: Elgin Town Hall, including former water feature and flagpoles
- Designated: 6 November 2000
- Reference no.: LB47391

Elgin Town Hall is a municipal building in Trinity Place in Elgin, Moray in Scotland. The building, which is used as an events venue, is a Category B listed building.

== History ==
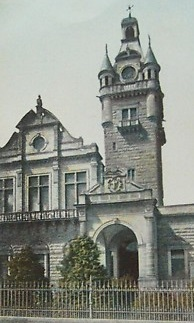
The Old Town Hall in Moray Street

The first town hall in Elgin was on the north side of Moray Street. It was designed by Alexander Marshall Mackenzie in the Scottish baronial style, built in ashlar stone and was completed in 1885. The design involved an asymmetrical main frontage of five bays facing onto Moray Street. It was rusticated and arcaded on the ground floor. The fourth bay featured an ornate porch and, behind it, a three-stage clock tower with bartizans, a pyramid-shaped roof and a belfry. The left hand section of three bays was fenestrated with mullioned and transomed windows on the first floor; the bays were flanked by pilasters supporting a cornice, an entablature, a stepped gable and a small pediment. The building was burned down in 1939, and the site was subsequently used to accommodate a modern police station.

After the Second World War, the burgh officials decided to commission a new town hall. The site they selected was a short distance to the east of Holy Trinity Church. The new building was designed by William Kininmonth in the modern style, built in reinforced concrete and glass and was completed in 1961.

The design involved a symmetrical main frontage of five bays facing north onto Trinity Place. There was a short flight of steps leading up to three two-leaf doors. The first floor was projected forward on piers and fenestrated with five casement windows. The main block was flanked by a pair of end blocks, which were connected to it by narrow recessed connecting bays. Internally, the principal room was the main assembly hall, which was equipped with balconies and a raked seating area.

The town hall was primarily used as an events venue: the burgh council was based on the ground floor of the Old Courthouse in the High Street. Performers included the rock band, The Kinks, in August 1965. In August 2024, Moray Council announced that an extensive programme of refurbishment works would be undertaken to a design by LDN Architects, commencing in early 2025: the work would involve the creation of two new entrances, expansion of the bar area and a large extension along North Street.

== See also ==
- List of listed buildings in Elgin, Moray
