= Bishopmill Bridge =

Bridge in Moray, Scotland

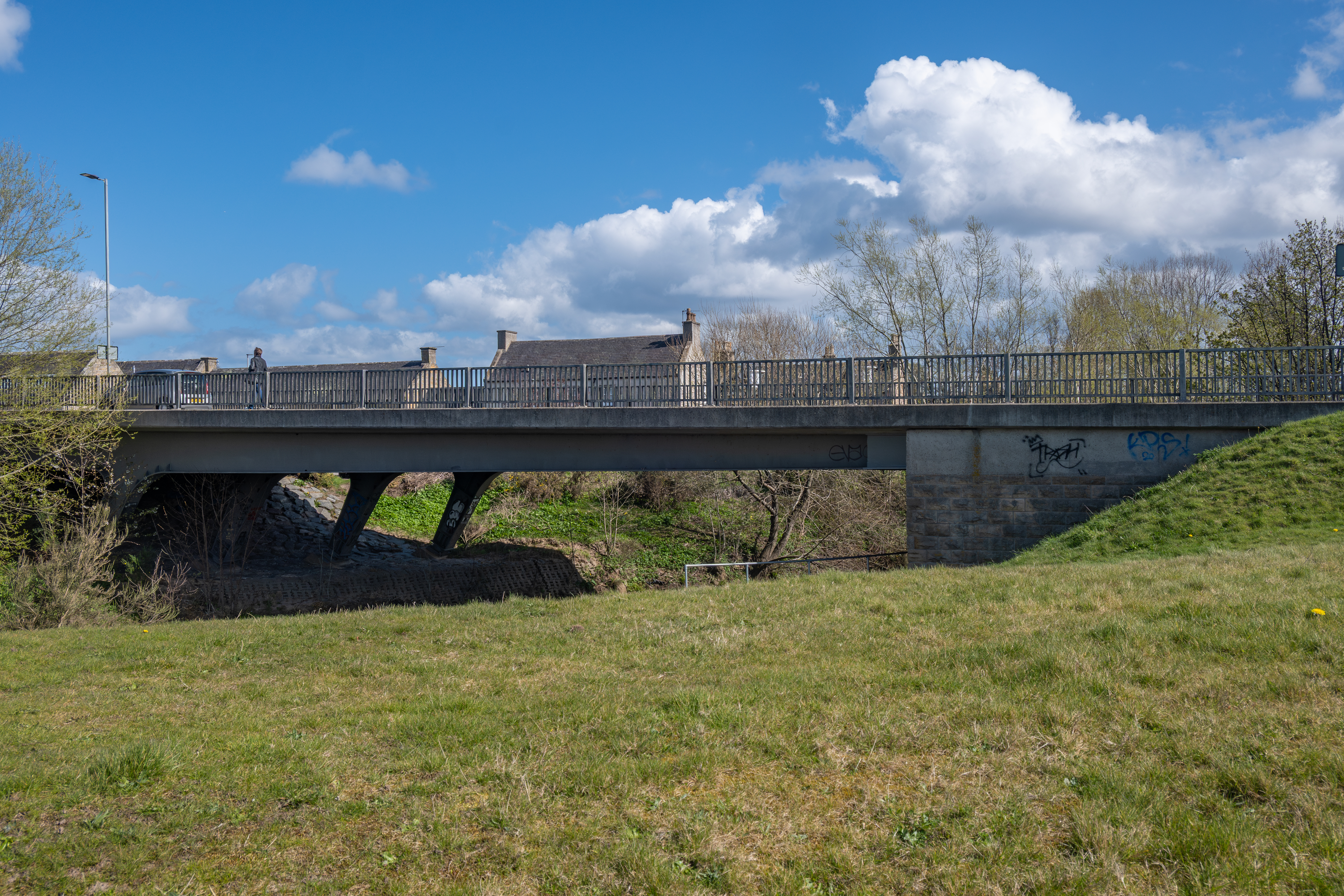
- Coordinates: 57°39′09″N 3°18′57″W
- Carries: A941 road
- Crosses: River Lossie
- Locale: Moray

History
- Opened: 1988 (current bridge)

Location
- Interactive map of Bishopmill Bridge

Bishopmill Bridge is a road bridge in Elgin, Moray, Scotland.

== History ==
The first bridge at the site opened in 1814. In 1830, a replacement designed by William Robertson of Elgin was opened. Structural defects were found in the bridge which led to it being replaced again in 1871 with a new structure designed by John Willet.

In 1988 a new road bridge was constructed adjacent to the existing Bishopmill Bridge allowing the older bridge to be used exclusively for pedestrians and cyclists. This followed the completion of the A96 inner relief road in 1981 which the bridge is connected to.

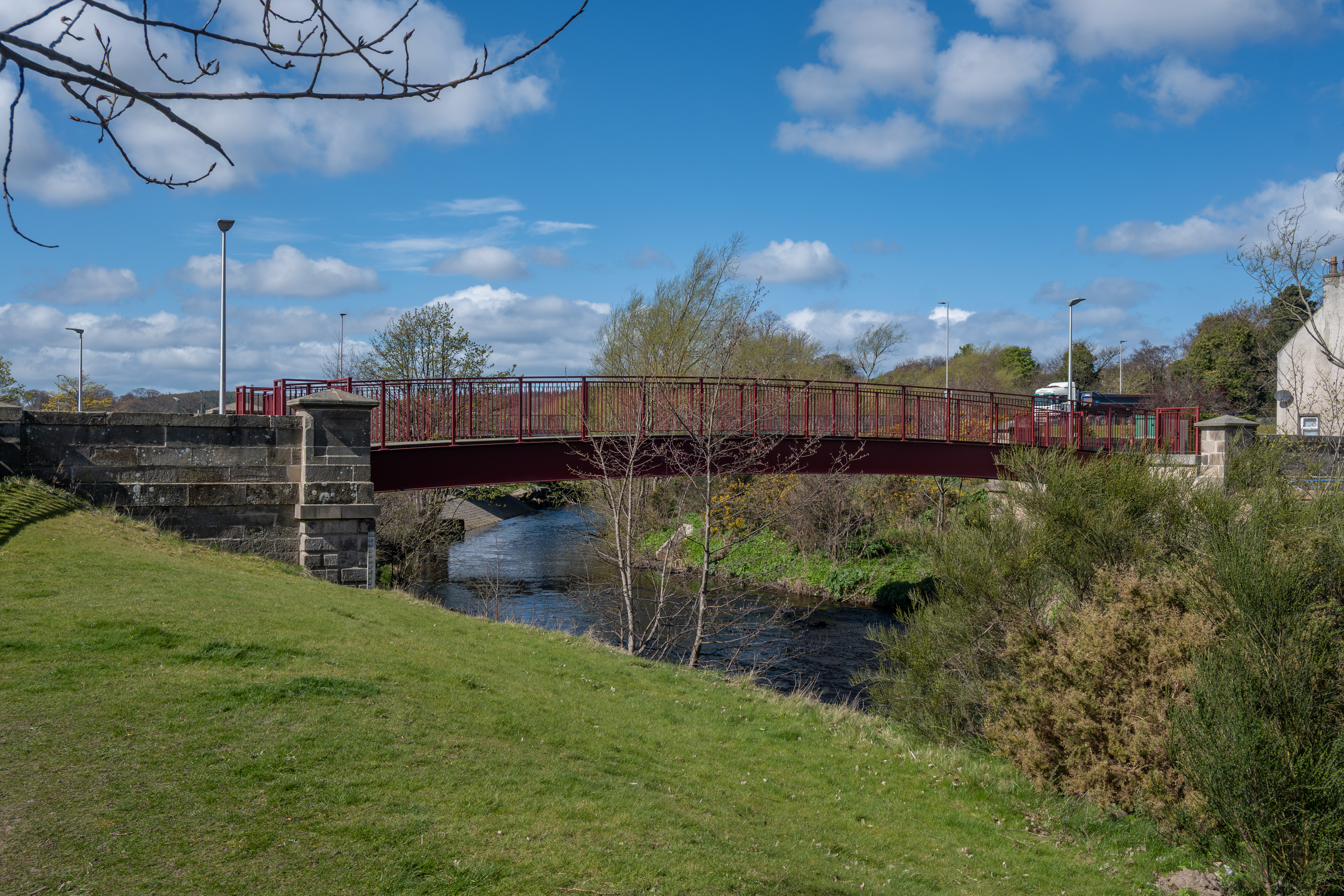
Lossie Wynd Footbridge

As part of the Elgin flood alleviation scheme, the old Bishopmill bridge was replaced. The new footbridge, named Lossie Wynd Footbridge, was opened in 2015.

== Design ==
The old Bishopmill bridge, now removed, was Category B listed.

The 1988 road bridge has a 24-foot (7.3-metre) wide roadway and pavements on both sides. It has a span of 118 feet (36 metres) and is of concrete and steel construction.

== See also ==
- List of bridges in Scotland
