= St Giles Centre =

Shopping centre in Scotland

Coordinates: 57.64928367°N 3.31545892°W

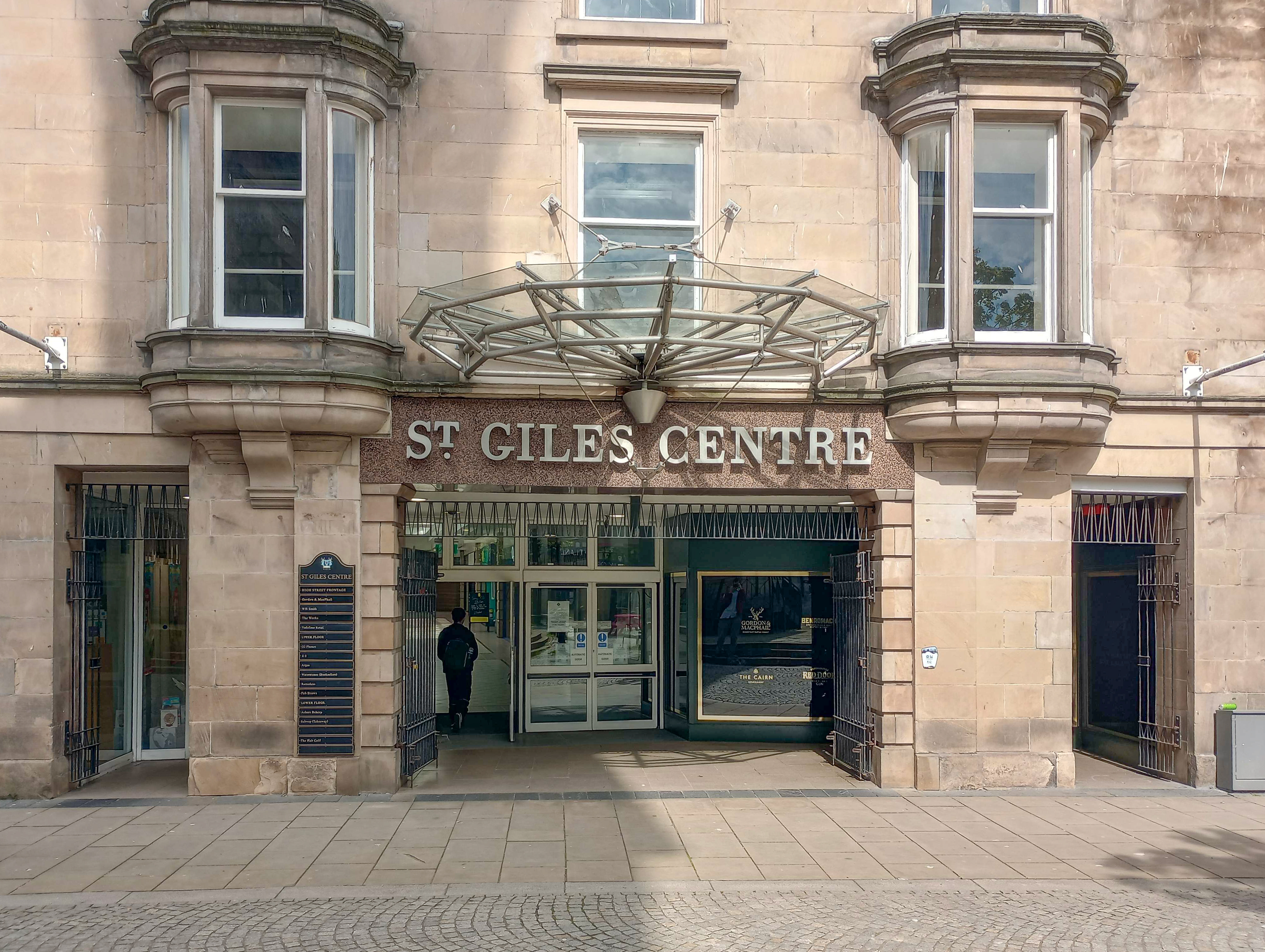
- Former front entrance of St Giles Centre
- Location: Elgin, Moray, Scotland
- Address: High Street, Elgin, Moray IV30 1EA
- Opened: November 15, 1991 (first store opened in February 1992)
- Closed: January 2025
- Developer: Sheraton Caltrust
- Owner: St Giles Shopping Centre Holdings Ltd.
- Num. of stores: 38
- Num. of anchor tenants: 4
- Floor area: 78,000 sq ft (7,200 m^{2})
- Floors: 2
- Parking: 93 spaces (270 originally)
- Public transit: Elgin bus station

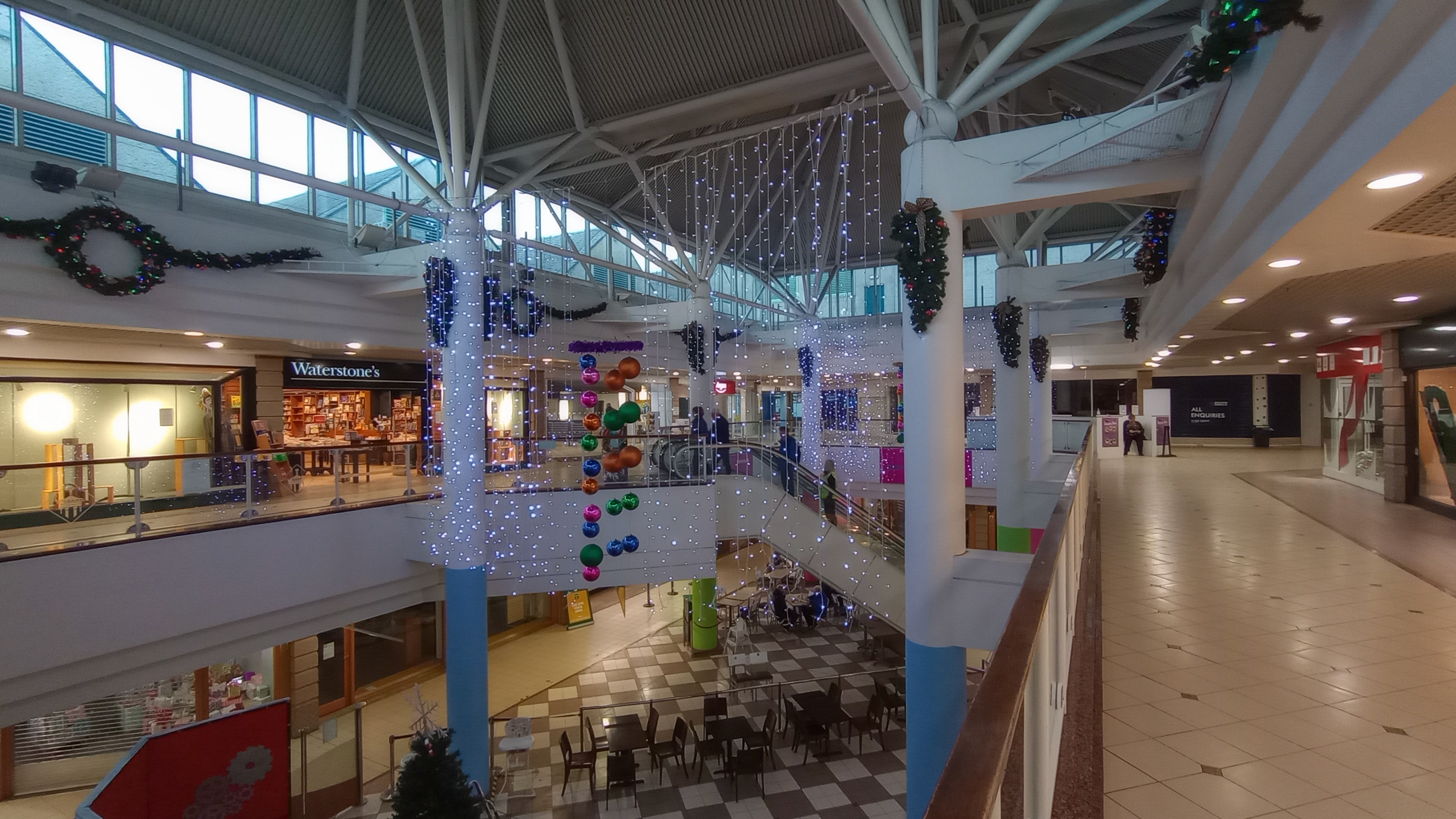
Main interior courtyard

St Giles Shopping Centre was a closed shopping centre in Elgin, Scotland. The Centre has two floors and has a glass lift. The Centre is supported with an adjacent car park. It also contains Elgin's bus station. The centre closed in January 2025.

== History ==
Plans were shown to the public in July 1987. The shopping centre was developed by Sheraton Caltrust and reused the facade of existing buildings. In April 1990, the developers stated that they predicted the Centre would be completed in September. However, it was delayed after the developers went into receivership. It officially opened on 15 November 1991 without any tenants. The first shop moved in during February 1992.

In January 2022 the upper three levels of the car park were closed after structural defects were found in the concrete supports. This reduced the number of spaces has been reduced from 270 to 93.

In January 2025 Moray council announced the closure of Saint Giles Shopping Centre, All stores were given 12 days to pack up and leave.
