= Elgin Pillar =

Ancient monument in Scotland

Coordinates: 57.6506°N 3.3053°W

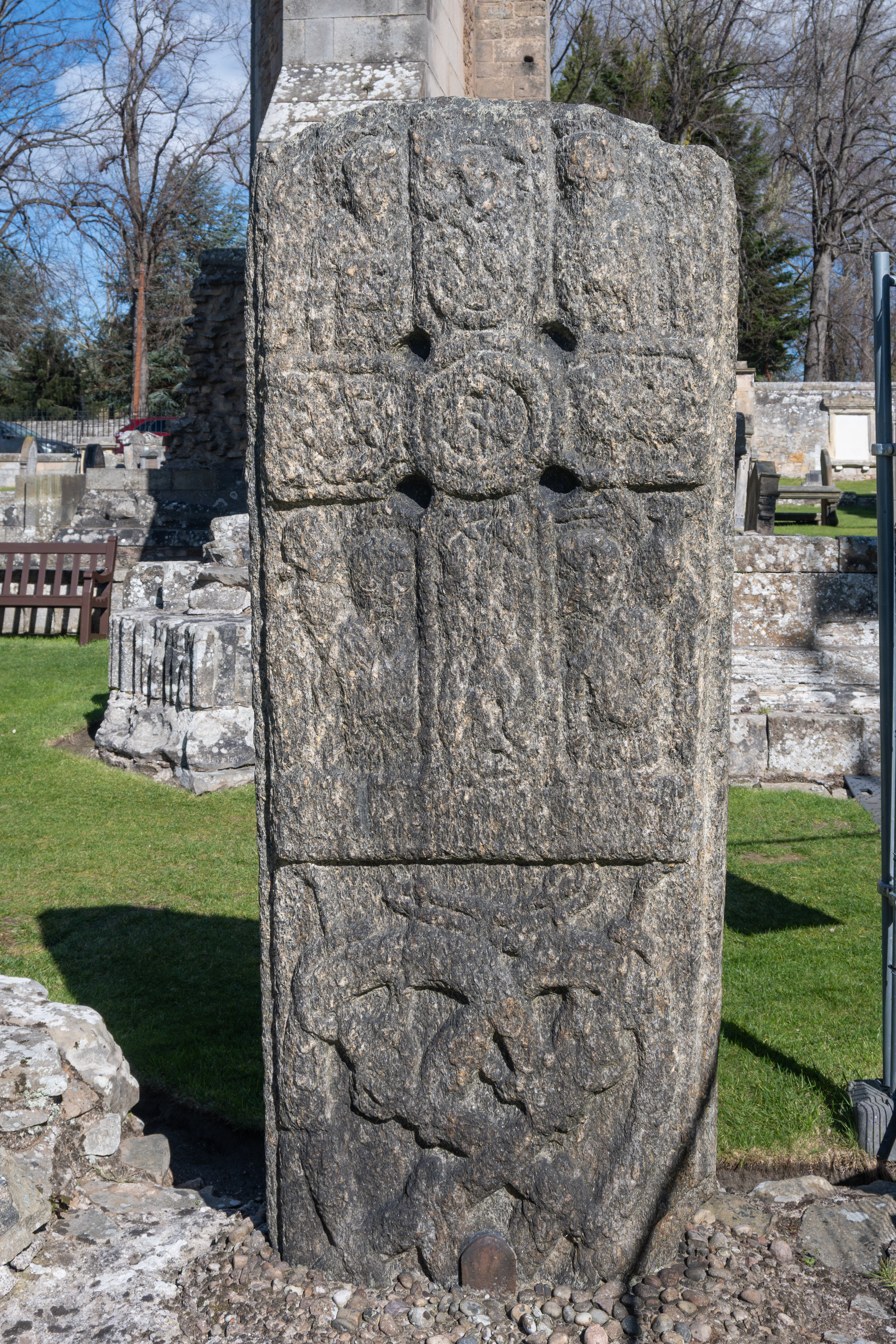
The Elgin Pillar standing in the grounds of Elgin Cathedral

The Elgin Pillar is a class II Pictish stone, now situated on the north west side of Elgin Cathedral, in Elgin, Moray in Scotland. It was discovered in 1823, lying 0.6 metres (24 in) beneath the surface of the former churchyard of St Giles' Church, in Elgin High Street. It is thought to date from the 9th century, and suggests there may have been a centre of early Christian activity in the marketplace area around the church in the centre of Elgin.

== Description ==
The stone is made of granite, and stands 2.08 metres (6 ft 10 in) high. It is 0.18 metres (7.1 in) deep and its width tapers from 0.91 metres (3 ft 0 in) at its head to 0.80 metres (2 ft 7 in) at its base.

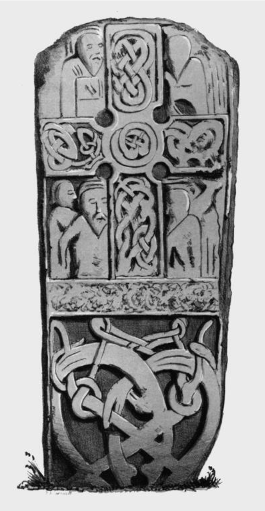
South face

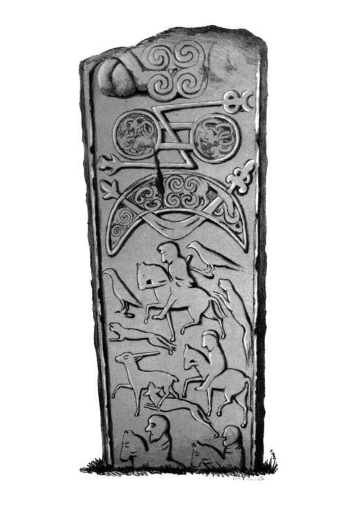
North face
