= St Giles' Church, Elgin =

Church in Elgin, Moray, Scotland

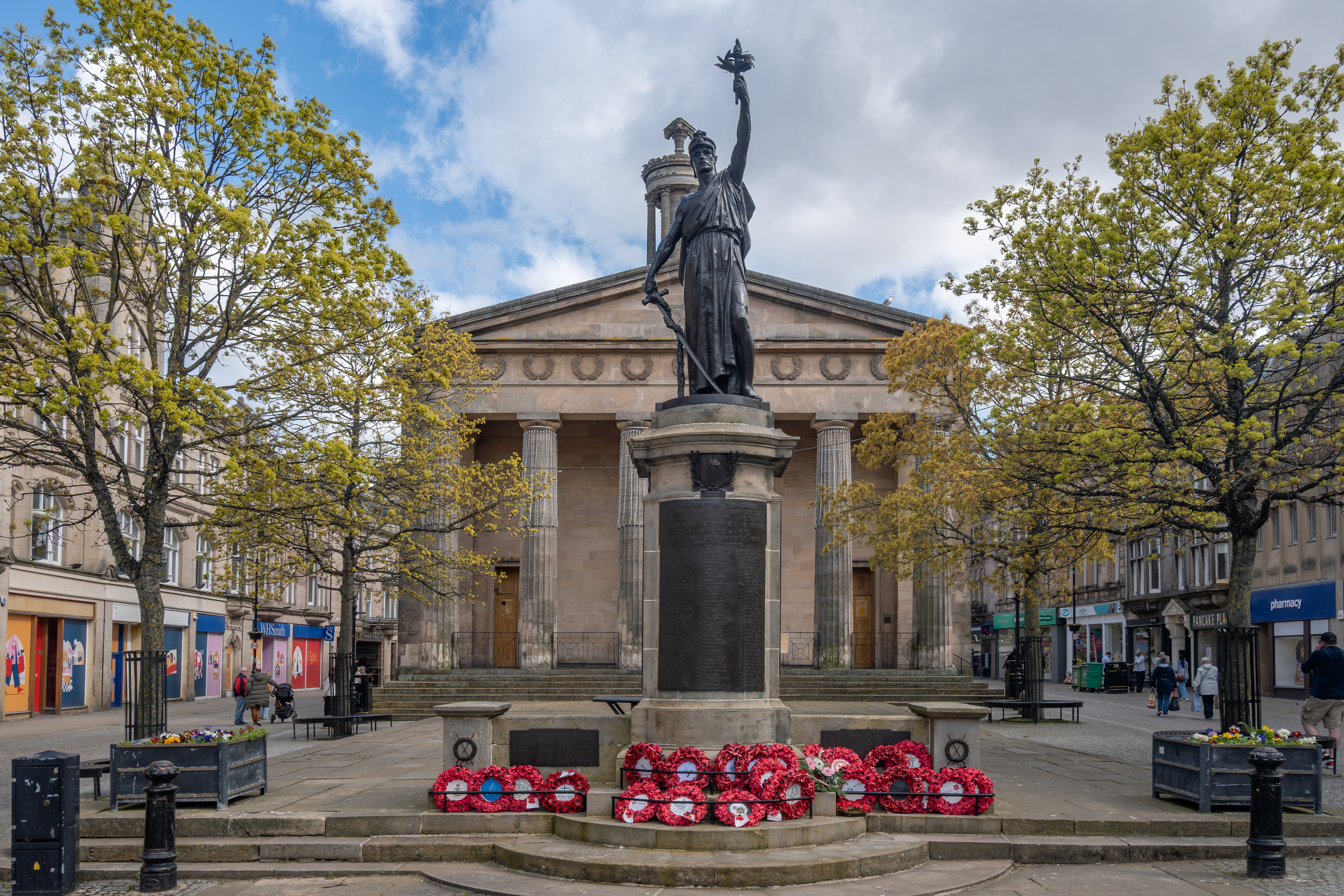
- St Giles Church in the centre of Elgin, Moray

- Location in Scotland

Religion
- Affiliation: Protestantism
- Governing body: Church of Scotland

Location
- Location: Elgin, Moray
- Interactive map of St Giles' Church, Elgin
- Coordinates: 57.6487°N 3.3153°W

Architecture
- Architect: Archibald Simpson (current building)
- Type: Church
- Style: Greek Revival (current building)
- Completed: 1828 (current building), ≥1390 (second building), ≤9th century (original building)

St Giles' Church is a Church of Scotland church situated in the centre of Elgin, Moray, in north-east Scotland. It is Elgin's original parish church. The current building was built between 1825 and 1828 and designed in a Greek Revival style by architect Archibald Simpson. It has been a Category A listed building since 1971.

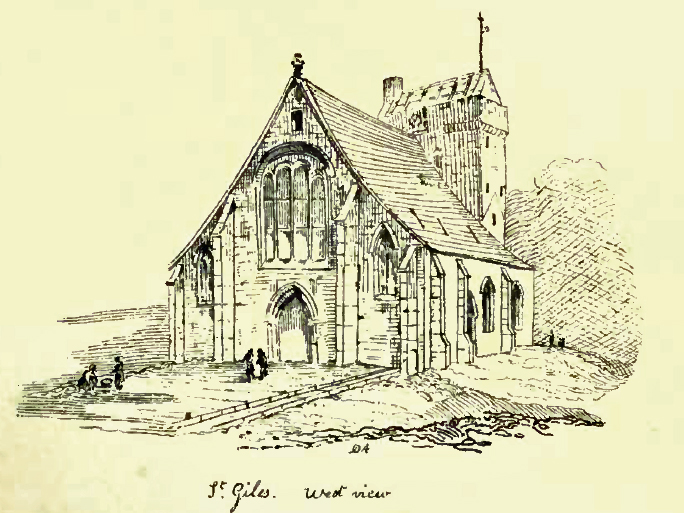
The previous kirk, demolished in 1826

The first record of a church on the site is a charter from William the Lion, dating from between 1187 and 1189, granting St Giles' to the Bishop of Moray, though the discovery of the 9th century Elgin Pillar in the area of the churchyard in 1823 suggests that the medieval church may have had a much earlier predecessor. St Giles' was restored after being burned by Alexander Stewart, the "Wolf of Badenoch", in 1390. The nave was rebuilt after its vaulted stone roof collapsed in 1679. Burials in the churchyard ceased in the early 17th century. Cartloads of human bones were removed in 1826, either transferred to the graveyard of Elgin Cathedral or mixed with soil and spread on fields around the burgh, while gravestones were used to pave the High Street.

== Bibliography ==
- Hall, Derek; MacDonald, A D S; Perry, D R; Terry, J; Cox, A; Crowley, N; Ellis, B M A; Holmes, N M McQ; Smith, C; Stevenson, R (November 1999). "The archaeology of Elgin: excavations on Ladyhill and in the High Street, with an overview of the archaeology of the burgh". Proceedings of the Society of Antiquaries of Scotland. 128: 753–829.
