= Moray College =

College in Elgin, Scotland

Moray College UHI
- Type: College
- Established: 1971
- Affiliations: University of the Highlands and Islands
- Principal: David Patterson
- Location: Elgin, Moray, Scotland; 57.6454°N 3.3162°W
- Website: www.moray.uhi.ac.uk

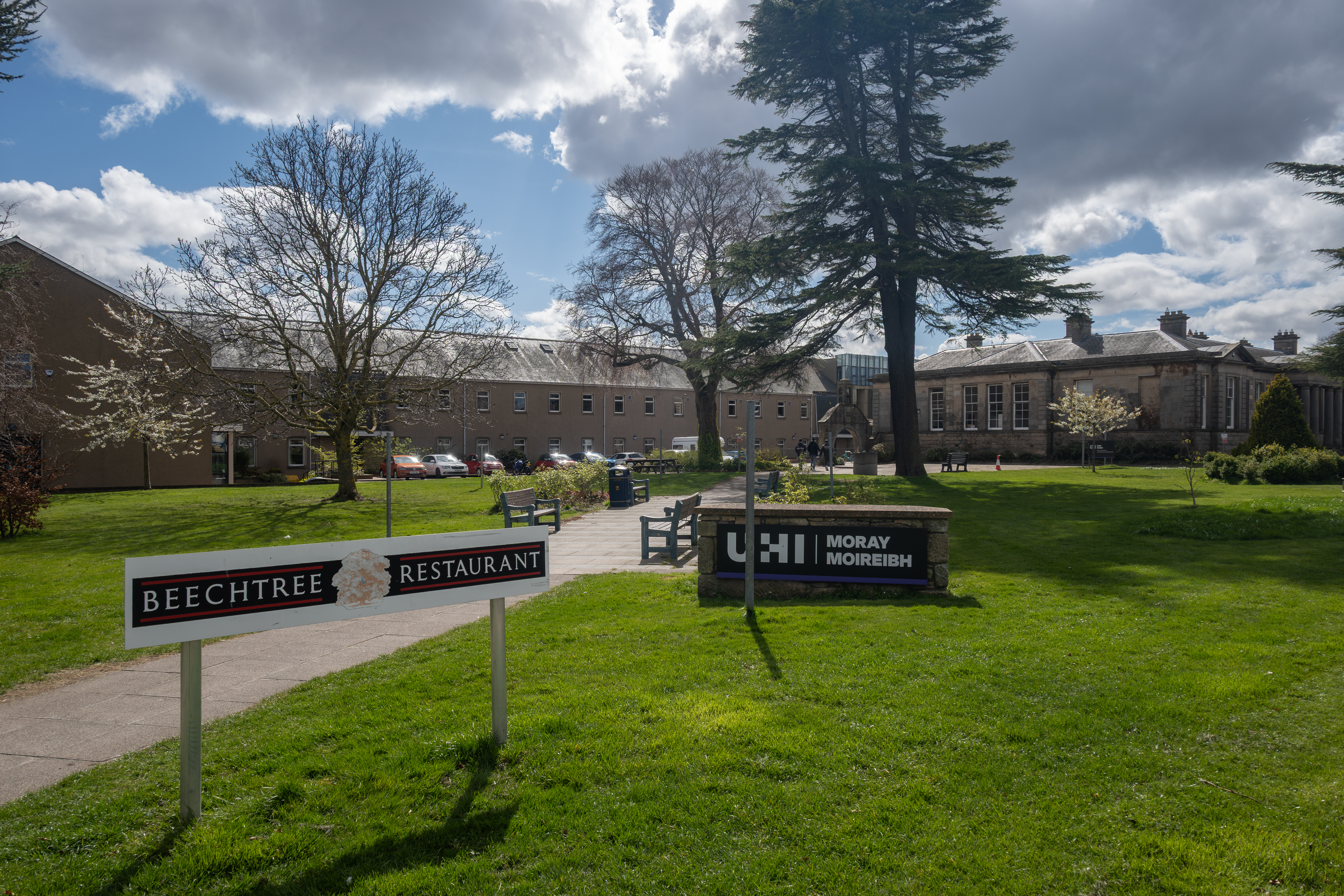
Moray College main entrance

Moray College (Scottish Gaelic: Colaiste Mhoireibh) is a further education college based in Elgin, in Moray, northeastern Scotland. It has 1,500 full-time students and 8,100 part-time students (based on 2009–2010 academic year). It employs approximately 370 staff (266 full-time) and is a college of the University of the Highlands and Islands. Student retention has improved (about 79.5% in 2022/23) and full-time FE achievement rates have generally returned above pre-pandemic levels

== History ==
In 1971 the Elgin Technical College was opened as a further education college by the local education authority. The name of the college changed to the Moray College of Further Education in 1978.

When the Further and Higher Education Scotland Act was passed in 1992 the college left the ownership of the local education authority (a process known as incorporation) and the name was changed to simply Moray College.

The nature of study changed at Moray College in 1997 when it became a partner college of the UHI Millennium Institute, allowing it to offer a far wider range of subjects for study through networked courses. In 2011 the UHI Millennium Institute gained full university status, becoming the University of Highlands and Islands.

The main campus for the college is in central Elgin, with Learning Centres also located in Buckie and Forres. Engineering and Construction are based within the Technology Centre campus in New Elgin. This campus is also home to the Gas, Oil and Renewables Assessment Centre.

Student Achievements :

- In 2022, a team of hospitality students reached the Grand Final of the Country Range Student Chef Challenge.

- Shirley Catto, an HNC Health & Social Care graduate (2007), received the national Queen’s Nurse Award in 2022

- In 2023 the on-campus Beechtree Restaurant (run by the Hospitality & Tourism Academy) was shortlisted as Best Restaurant in North Scotland at the Scottish Hospitality Awards

=== Alexander Graham Bell Centre ===
The Alexander Graham Bell Centre is a 3-storey extension at Moray College UHI which includes a simulated ward area, fitted with healthcare equipment such as hoists, that can be used as part of training for nursing. The £6.5m facility was funded by Moray College UHI, NHS Grampian, Highlands and Islands Enterprise and the European Regional Development Fund. It has received an award in the Education Building or Project category at the prestigious Scottish Design Awards. The centre also has conference facilities, eight classrooms and a café.

== Curriculum ==
Main subject areas taught at the college are art, business and administration, care and social sciences, communication and languages, computing and information technology, hairdressing, beauty and complementary therapies, hospitality, science, maths, sport, skills for life and technology. A number of additional subject areas are available through the college partnership with the University of the Highlands and Islands.

- In 2011 the college launched an online whisky tasting course.

- A BSc (Hons) Integrative Healthcare degree (in complementary therapies and wellness) was launched in 2017

- Higher courses in Biology and Chemistry ceased in 2024 due as a part of cost-saving measures.
