= The Northern Scot =

Scottish newspaper

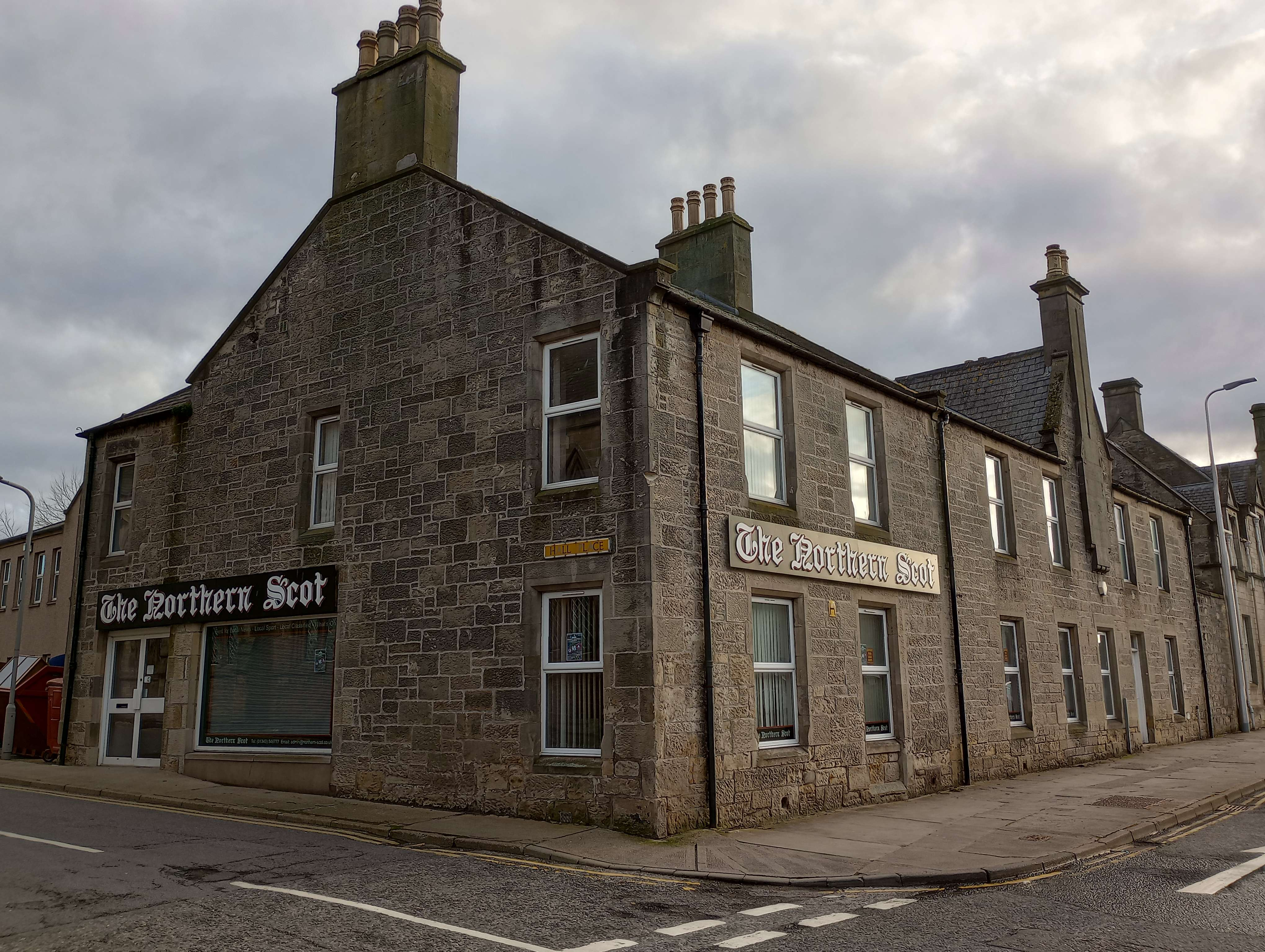
- Headquarters based in Elgin, Moray
- Type: Weekly newspaper
- Owner(s): Highland News and Media Ltd
- Headquarters: 74-76 South St Elgin IV30 1JG 01343 548777
- Circulation: 2,249 (as of 2023)
- Website: northern-scot.co.uk

The Northern Scot is a weekly newspaper published in Moray, Scotland.
