= Elgin, Moray =

Town in Moray, Scotland

Coordinates: 57°38′55″N 3°18′55″W

Elgin: Scottish Gaelic: Eilginn; Scots: Ailgin
- Market town, former cathedral city and royal burgh
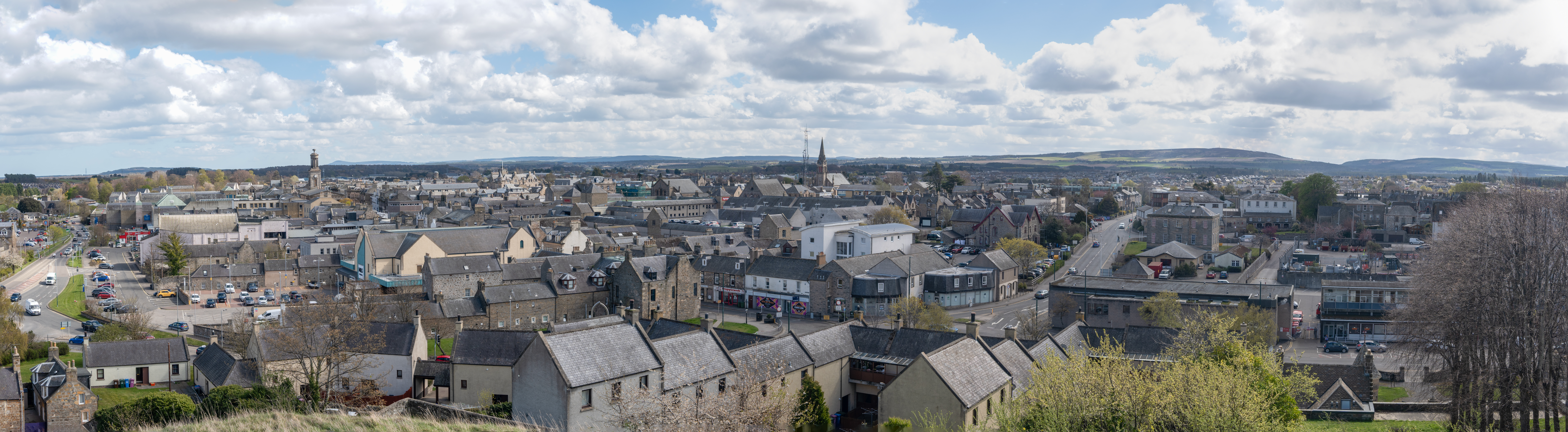
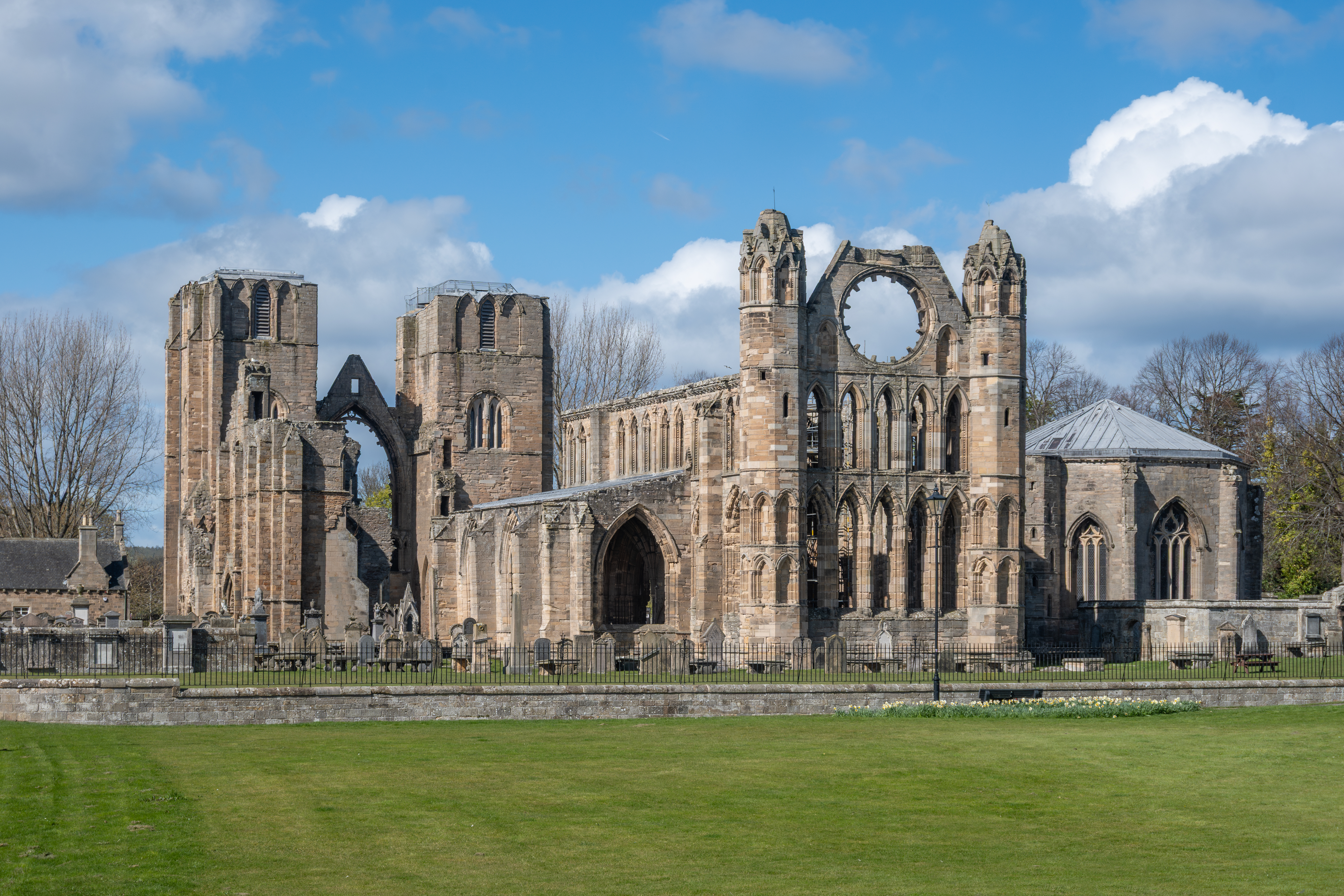
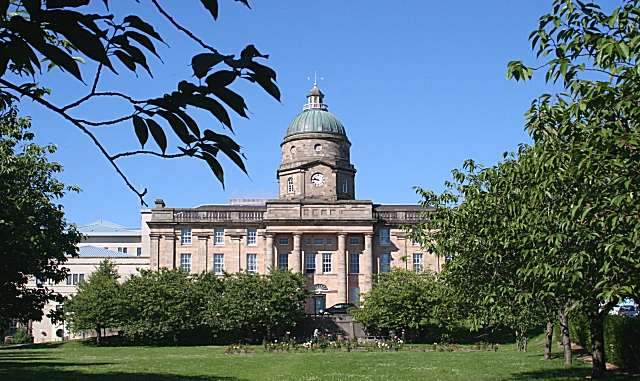
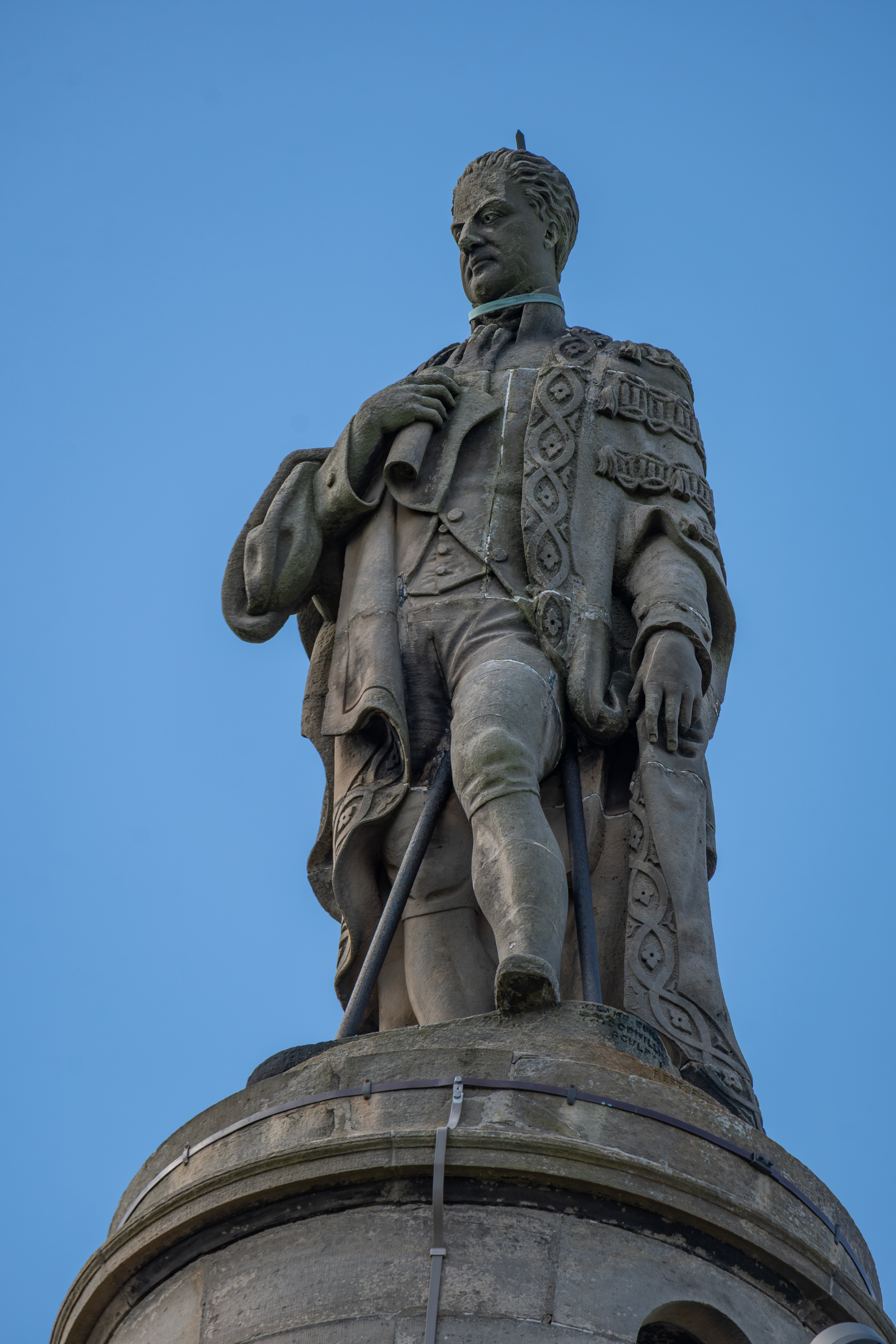
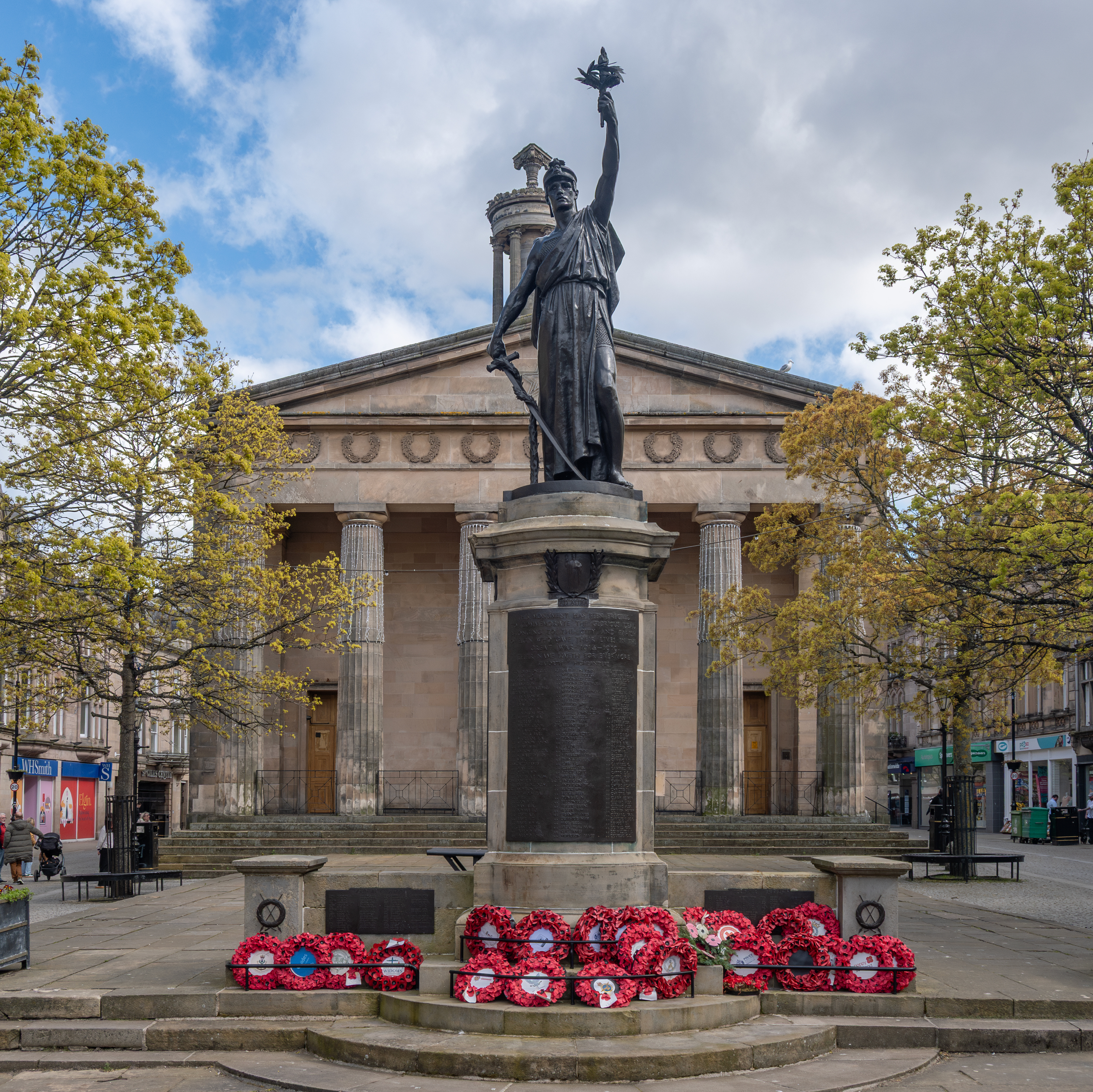
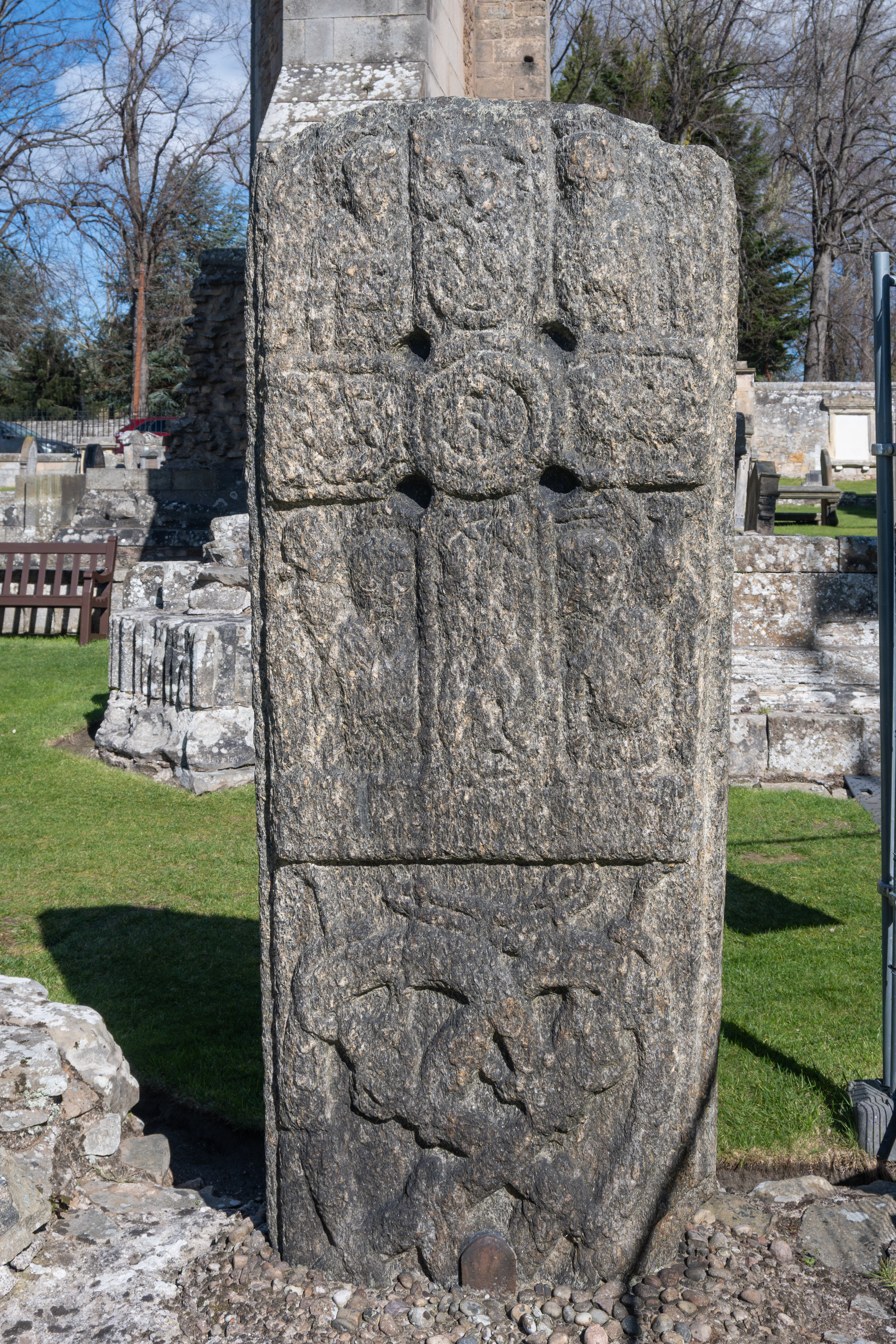
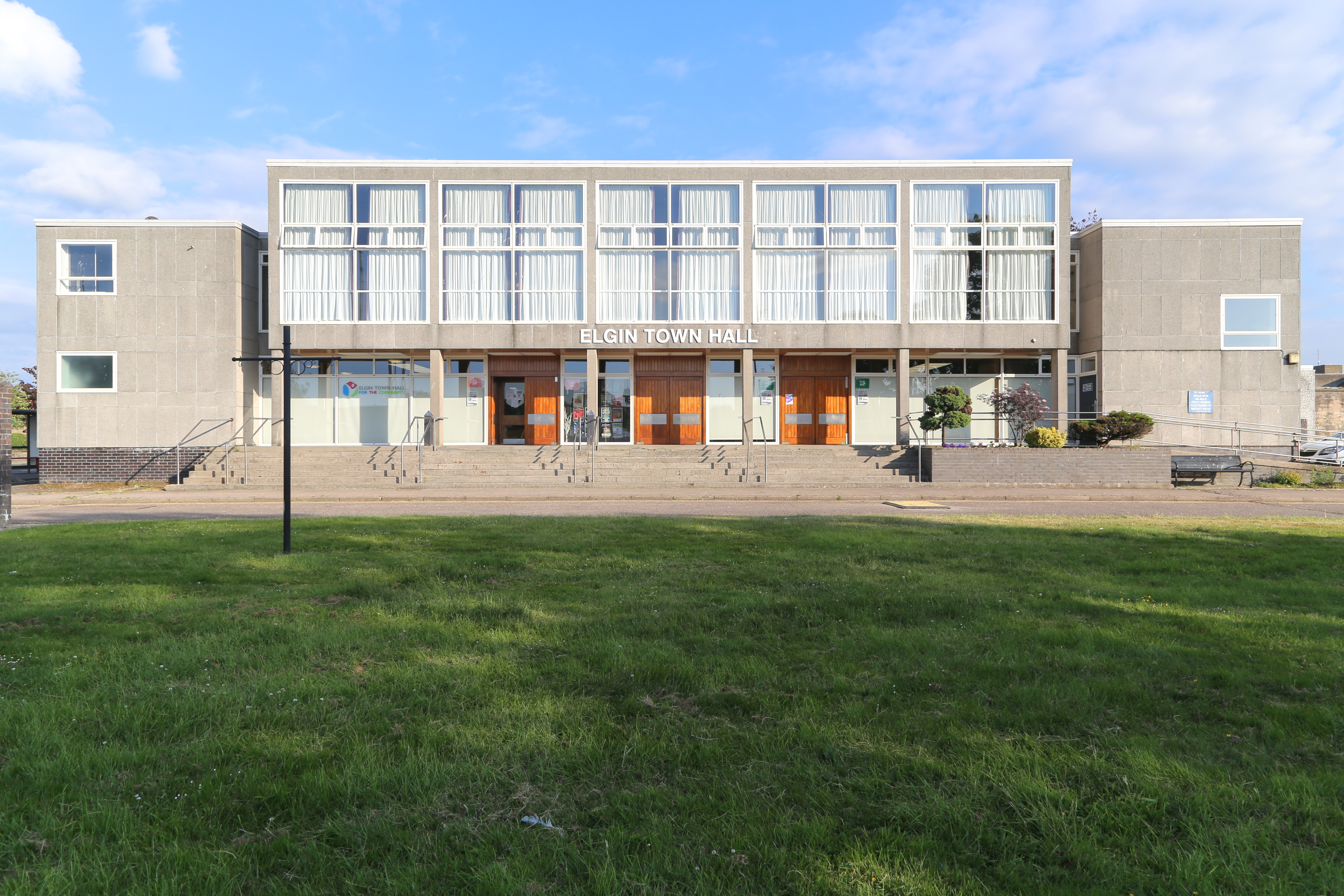
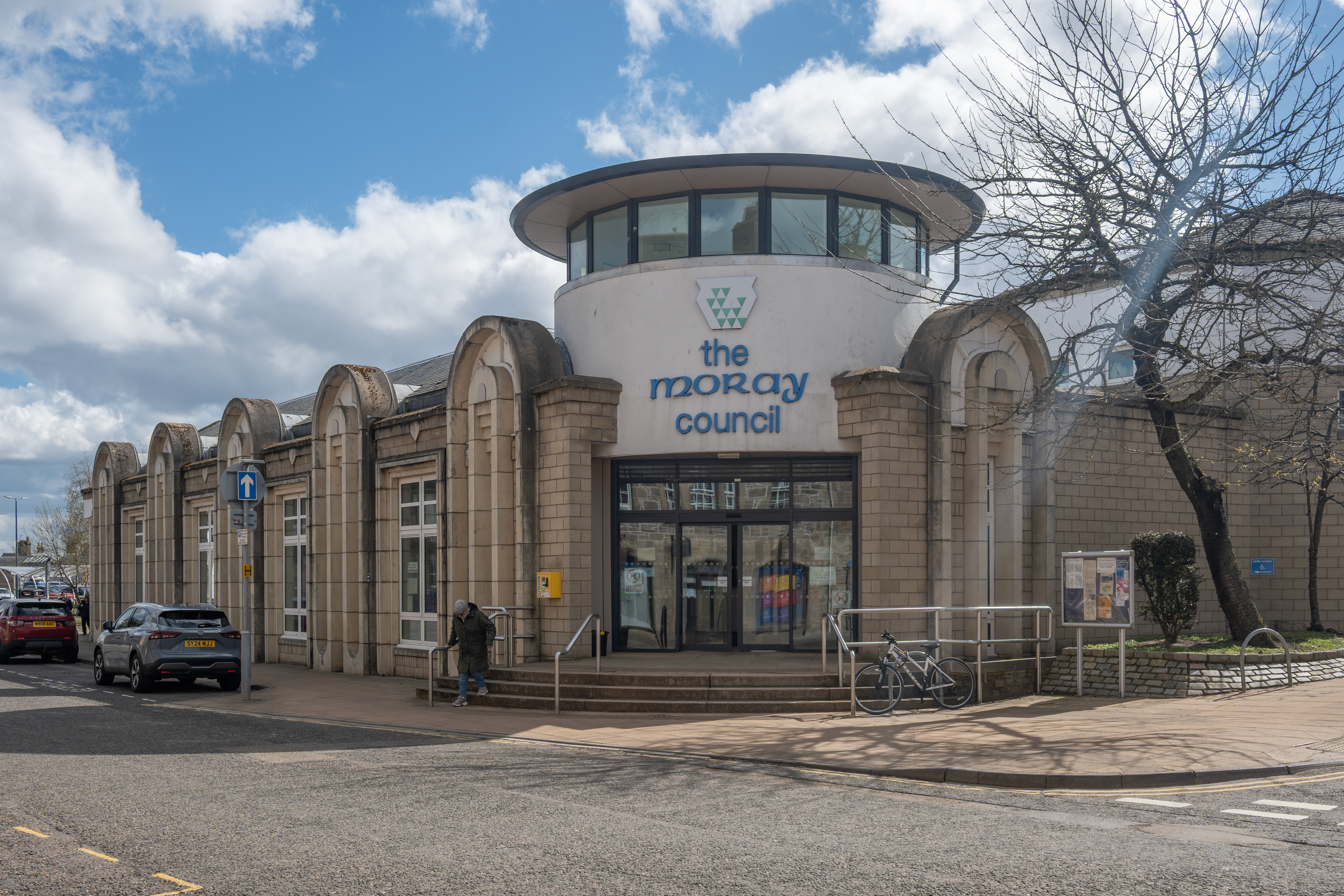
- Elgin as seen from Lady Hill Elgin Cathedral Dr Gray's Hospital Duke of Gordon's Monument St Giles' Church & War Memorial Elgin Pillar Elgin Town Hall Moray Council

- Location within Moray
- Area: 9.47 km^{2} (3.66 sq mi)
- Population: 24,640 (2022)
  - Density: 2,602/km^{2} (6,740/sq mi)
- OS grid reference: NJ220626
  - Edinburgh: 117 mi (188 km)
  - London: 443 mi (713 km)
- Council area: Moray
- Lieutenancy area: Moray
- Country: Scotland
- Sovereign state: United Kingdom
- Post town: ELGIN
- Postcode district: IV30
- Dialling code: 01343
- Police: Scotland
- Fire: Scottish
- Ambulance: Scottish
- UK Parliament: Moray West, Nairn and Strathspey
- Scottish Parliament: Moray

Elgin (/ˈɛlɡɪn/ EL-ghin; Scots: Ailgin; Scottish Gaelic: Eilginn [ˈel(e)kʲɪɲ]) is a historic market town (former cathedral city) and formerly a royal burgh in Moray, Scotland. It is the administrative and commercial centre for Moray. The town originated to the south of the River Lossie on the higher ground above the floodplain where the town of Birnie is. There, the church of Birnie Kirk was built in 1140 and still serves the community.

Elgin is first documented in the Cartulary of Moray in AD 1190. It was created a royal burgh in the 12th century by King David I of Scotland, and by that time had a castle on top of the present-day Lady Hill to the west of the town. The origin of the name Elgin is likely to be Celtic. It may derive from 'Aille' literally signifying beauty, but in topography a beautiful place or valley. Another possibility is 'ealg', meaning both 'Ireland' and 'worthy'. The termination 'gin' or 'in' are Celtic endings signifying little or diminutive forms, hence Elgin could mean beautiful place, worthy place or little Ireland.

== History ==
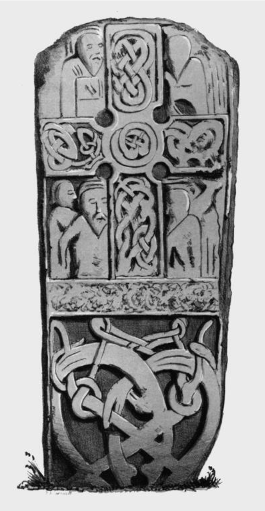
The 9th century Pictish Elgin Pillar, found in the churchyard of St Giles' Church in 1823

The discovery of the Elgin Pillar, a 9th-century class II Pictish stone, under the High Street in 1823 suggests there may have been an Early Christian presence in the area of the later market, but there is no further evidence of activity before Elgin was created a Royal Burgh in the 12th century. In August 1040, MacBeth's army defeated and killed Duncan I at Bothganowan (Pitgaveny), near Elgin. Elgin is first recorded in a charter of David I in 1151 in which he granted an annuity to the Priory of Urquhart. David had made Elgin a royal burgh around 1130, after his defeat of Óengus of Moray. During David's reign, the castle was established at the top of what is now Lady Hill. The town received a royal charter from Alexander II in 1224 when he granted the land for a new cathedral to Andrew, Bishop of Moray. This finally settled the episcopal see which had been at various times at Kinneddar, Birnie and Spynie. The ancient Forest of Darnaway was designated a Royal Forest and was used by the Scottish kings for hunting.

Alexander II was Elgin's greatest benefactor and returned many times to his royal castle. He established the two religious houses of the town, the Dominicans or Blackfriars on the west side and the Franciscans or Greyfriars in the east. Further to the east stood the Hospital of Maison Dieu, or House of God also founded during the reign of Alexander II for the reception of poor men and women.

On 19 July 1224, the foundation stone of the new Elgin Cathedral was ceremoniously laid. The cathedral was completed sometime after 1242 but was completely destroyed by fire in 1270. The reasons for this are unrecorded. The buildings now remain as ruins date from the reconstruction following that fire. The Chartulary of Moray described the completed cathedral as "Mirror of the country and the glory of the kingdom".

Edward I of England travelled twice to Elgin. During his first visit in 1296, he was impressed by what he saw. Preserved in the Cotton library now held in the British Library is the journal of his stay, describing the castle and the town of Elgin as "bon chastell et bonne ville"—good castle and good town. By his second visit in September 1303, the castle's wooden interior had been burned while held by the English governor, Henry de Rye. As a result, he only stayed in Elgin for two days and then camped at Kinloss Abbey from 13 September until 4 October. King Edward was furious when David de Moravia, Bishop of Moray, joined Scotland's cause with Bruce, and Edward appealed to the Pope who excommunicated the bishop, thus removing papal protection, causing him to flee to Orkney, then to Norway, only to return after Robert Bruce's victories against the English. After Edward's death in July 1307, Robert the Bruce attacked Elgin and then retook Scotland in 1308.

In August 1370 Alexander Bur, Bishop of Moray began payments to Alexander Stewart, Wolf of Badenoch, King Robert III's brother, for the protection of his lands and men. In February 1390, the bishop then turned to Thomas Dunbar, son of the Earl of Moray, to provide the protection. This action infuriated Stewart and in May he descended from his castle on an island in Lochindorb and burned the town of Forres in revenge. In June he burned much of Elgin, including two monasteries, St Giles Church, the Hospital of Maison Dieu and the cathedral. Andrew of Wyntoun's Orygynale Cronykil of Scotland (a 15th-century history of Scotland) described this action by "wyld, wykked Heland-men". The rebuilding of the cathedral took many years; but much of it has since crumbled away due to the inferior quality of the stone made available to the 15th- and 16th-century masons, while the 13th-century construction still remains. In 1506, the great central tower collapsed and although rebuilding work began the next year it was not completed till 1538.

=== From the Reformation to the eighteenth century ===
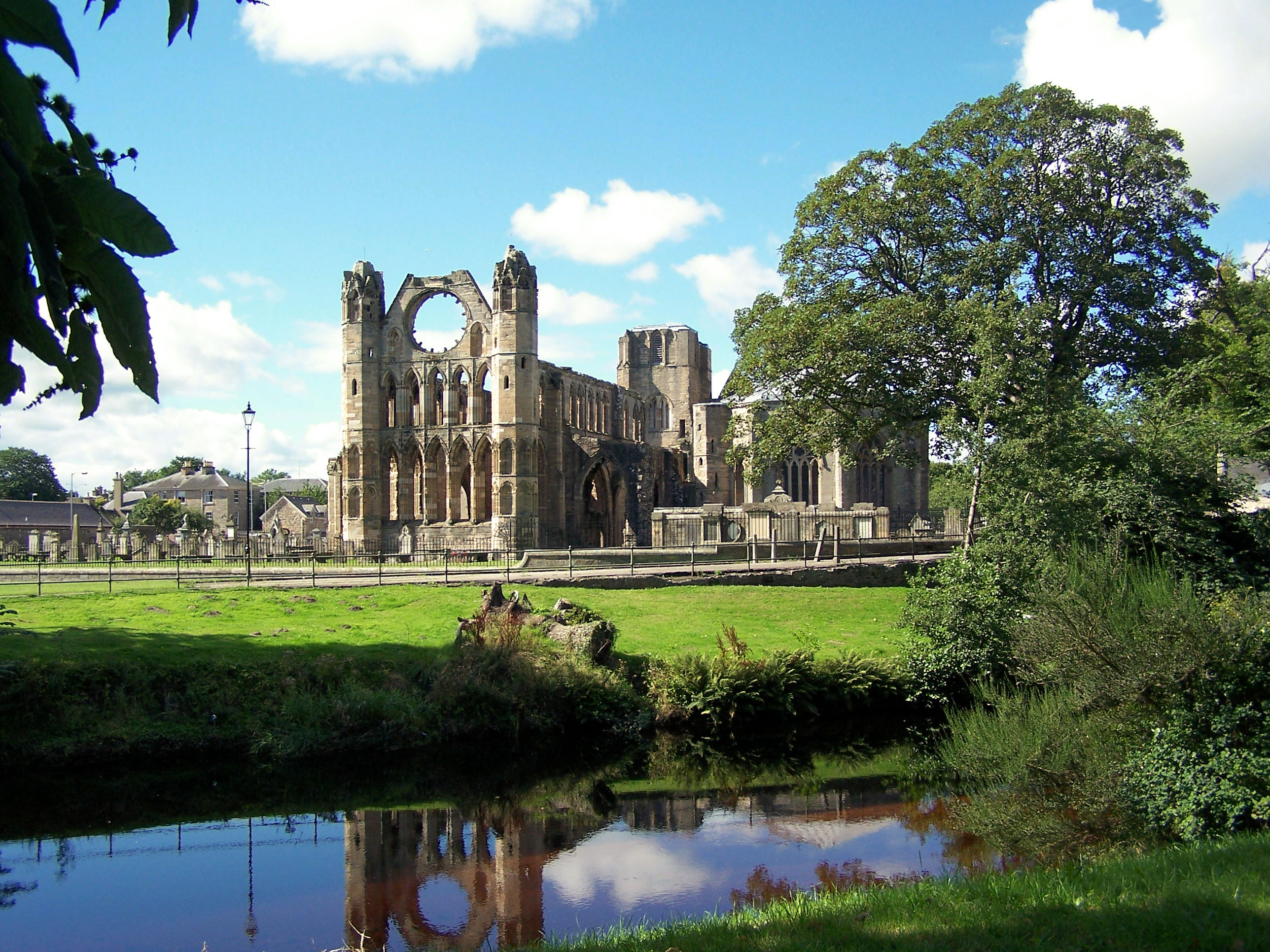
Elgin Cathedral

The citizens of Elgin and surrounding areas did not seem to object to the new religion following the Reformation. In 1568 the lead was stripped from the roof of the cathedral, by order of the Privy Council of Scotland. The lead was sold to William Birnie and Alexander Clark. The proceeds went to the maintenance of Regent Moray's soldiers, but the ship taking the lead cargo to Holland sank almost immediately on leaving Aberdeen harbour. Without this protection, the building began to deteriorate.

The Kirk Session records of Elgin name women who danced at New Year 1623 to the sound of a trumpet. Six men, described as guisers or "gwysseris" performed a sword dance wearing masks and visors covering their faces in the churchyard and in the courtyard of a house. They were fined 40 shillings each. The fabric of the Cathedral continued to deteriorate. In 1637, the rafters over the choir were blown down and in 1640 the minister of St Giles along with the Laird of Innes and Alexander Brodie of Brodie, all ardent Covenanters, removed and destroyed the ornately carved screen and woodwork that had remained intact. The tracery of the West window was destroyed sometime between 1650 and 1660 by Cromwell's soldiers. On Easter Sunday 1711 the central tower collapsed for the second time in its history but caused much more damage. The rubble was quarried for various projects in the vicinity until 1807 when, through the efforts of Joseph King of Newmill, a wall was built around the cathedral and a keeper's house erected. Mountains of this rubble were cleared by one John Shanks, enabling visitors to view the ornate stonemasonry. Shanks was presented with an ornate snuffbox by the authorities; it is now in Elgin Museum.

When Daniel Defoe toured Scotland in 1717, he visited Elgin and said:

In this rich country is the city, or town rather, of Elgin; I say city, because in antient time the monks claim'd it for a city; and the cathedral shews, by its ruins, that it was a place of great magnificence. Nor must it be wonder'd at, if in so pleasant, so rich, and so agreeable a part of the country, all the rest being so differing from it, the clergy should seat themselves in a proportion'd number, seeing we must do them the justice to say, that if there is any place richer and more fruitful, and pleasant than another, they seldom fail to find it out. As the country is rich and pleasant, so here are a great many rich inhabitants, and in the town of Elgin in particular; for the gentlemen, as if this was the Edinburgh, or the court, for this part of the island, leave their Highland habitations in the winter and come and live here for the diversion of the place and plenty of provisions; and there is, on this account, a great variety of gentlemen for society, and that of all parties and of all opinions. This makes Elgin a very agreeable place to live in, notwithstanding its distance, being above 450 measur'd miles [725 km] from London, and more, if we must go by Edinburgh.

The cathedral is known as the Lantern of the North. When Bishop Bur wrote to King Robert III, complaining of the wanton destruction done to the building by the King's brother, the Wolf of Badenoch, he describes the cathedral as "the ornament of this district, the glory of the kingdom and the admiration of foreigners." Chambers, in his Picture of Scotland, says:

It is an allowed fact, which the ruins seem still to attest, that this was by far the most splendid specimen of ecclesiastical architecture in Scotland, the abbey church of Melrose not excepted. It must be acknowledged that the edifice last mentioned is a wonderful instance of symmetry and elaborate decoration; yet in extent, in loftiness, in impressive magnificence, and even in minute decoration, Elgin has been manifestly superior. Enough still remains to impress the solitary traveller with a sense of admiration mixed with astonishment.

Lachlan Shaw in his History of the Province of Moray was equally impressed when he wrote

the church when entire was a building of Gothic architecture inferior to few in Europe.

Prince Charles Edward Stuart travelled to Elgin from Inverness in March 1746 and, falling ill with a feverish cold, stayed for 11 days before returning to await the arrival of the king's army. He stayed in Elgin with Mrs Anderson, a passionate Jacobite, at Thunderton House. She kept the sheets that the Prince slept on and was buried in them a quarter of a century later. The Duke of Cumberland passed through the town on 13 April, camping at Alves on the way to meet the Prince in battle on Drummossie Muir. After the battle, William Boyd, 4th Earl of Kilmarnock, one of the Prince's generals, was captured and taken to London and eventual execution, but he wrote to his friend from prison about his indebtedness to the shoemakers of Elgin:

Beside my personal debts mentioned in general and particular in the State, there is one for which I am liable in justice, if it is not paid, owing to poor people who gave their work for it by my orders. It was at Elgin in Murray, the Regiment I commanded wanted shoes. I commissioned something about seventy pair of shoes and brogues, which might come to 3 shillngs or three shillings and sixpence each, one with the other. The magistrates divided them among the shoemakers of the town and country, and each shoemaker furnished his proportion. I drew on the town, for the price, out of the composition laid on them, but I was afterwards told at Inverness that, it was believed, the composition was otherwise applied, and the poor shoemakers not paid. As these poor people wrought by my orders, it will be a great ease to my heart to think they are not to lose by me, as too many have done in the course of that year, but had I lived I might have made some inquiry after but now it is impossible, as their hardships in loss of horses and such things, which happeened through my soldiers, are so interwoven with what was done by other people, that it would be very hard, if not impossible, to separate them. If you'll write to Mr Innes of Dalkinty at Elgin (with whom I was quartered when I lay there), he will send you an account of the shoes, and if they were paid to the shoemakers or no; and if they are not, I beg you'll get my wife, or my successors to pay them when they can...

=== Nineteenth century ===
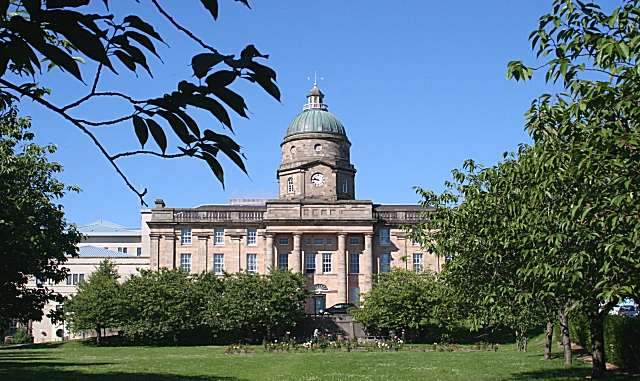
Dr Gray's Hospital

In the 19th century, the old medieval town of Elgin was swept away. The first major addition to the town centre was the Assembly Rooms, built in 1821 by the Trinity Lodge of Freemasons, at the corner of High Street and North Street. In 1819, Dr Gray's Hospital was built on unused ground. The building has imposing columns and distinctive dome. Dr Alexander Gray, a doctor who worked for and made his fortune with the East India Company, endowed £26,000 for the hospital. In 1828 the new parish church of St Giles was built at a cost of £10,000. L. General Andrew Anderson, born in Elgin, also of the East India Company, died in 1824 and bequeathed £70,000 to the town to found an institution for the welfare of the elderly poor and for the education of orphans. The Anderson Institution was built in the east end of the town in 1832 with accommodation for 50 children and ten elderly people.

The population in 1841 was 3,911 inhabitants. The Burgh Court House was built in 1841, the museum was completed in 1842 and Elgin Sheriff Court was built in 1866.

The Morayshire Railway was officially opened in ceremonies at Elgin and Lossiemouth on 10 August 1852, the steam engines having been delivered to Lossiemouth by sea. It was the first railway north of Aberdeen and initially ran only 5 1/2 miles (9 km) between Elgin and Lossiemouth. It was later extended south to Craigellachie. The Great North of Scotland Railway took over the working of the line in 1863 and bought the company in 1881 following the Morayshire Railway's return to solvency from crippling debt.

The town was becoming prosperous, and by 1882 it had a Head Post Office with a savings bank, insurance and telegraph departments, and branches of the Bank of Scotland and the British Linen Company, Caledonian, Commercial, North of Scotland, Royal and Union Banks, and the National Securities Savings Bank, offices or agencies of 48 insurance companies, five hotels, and a newspaper.

The Cooper Park drill hall was completed in 1908.

The war memorial in Elgin dates from 1921 and represents "Peace and Victory". It was designed by Percy Portsmouth.

== Geography and geology ==
The modern town straddles the River Lossie, with the suburbs of Bishopmill to the north and New Elgin to the south. Permo–Triassic rocks, rare in Scotland, are commonly found around Elgin. These are composed of aeolian sandstone formed when this area was subjected to desert conditions. Quarry Wood, on the town's edge, has a formation nicknamed Cuttie's Hillock which produced the internationally known fossils called the Elgin Reptiles. In the Elgin district, boulders belonging to the lowest group of Jurassic strata, Oxford clay and chalk are found both in glacial deposits and on the surface of the ground. The largest of these deposits is at Linksfield, where limestone and shale lie on boulder clay. There is a large hill in Elgin's town centre, often viewed as the highlight of the Elgin tourist trail.

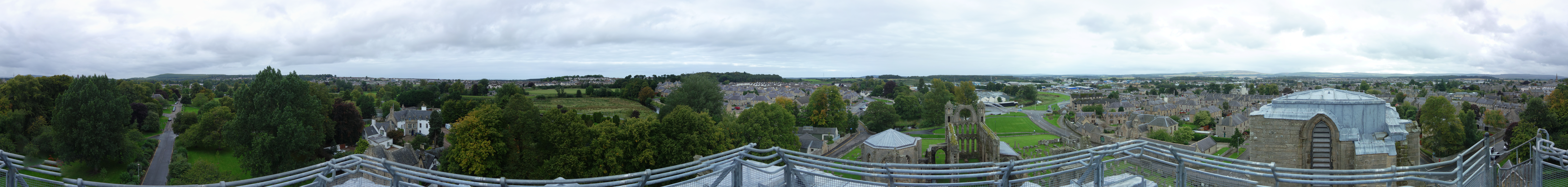
Panorama of Elgin from the northern spire of Elgin Cathedral

== Climate ==
Elgin's climate is temperate maritime, with cool summers and relatively mild winters due to its proximity to the sea. Rainfall is quite low as it is in the rain shadow of mountains to the west and south-west.

Climate data for Elgin, elevation: 18 m or 59 ft, 1981–2010 normals
Month	Jan	Feb	Mar	Apr	May	Jun	Jul	Aug	Sep	Oct	Nov	Dec	Year
Mean daily maximum °C (°F)	6.8 (44.2)	7.2 (45.0)	9.1 (48.4)	11.2 (52.2)	13.8 (56.8)	16.1 (61.0)	18.5 (65.3)	18.2 (64.8)	16.0 (60.8)	12.7 (54.9)	9.3 (48.7)	6.7 (44.1)	12.1 (53.9)
Mean daily minimum °C (°F)	0.4 (32.7)	0.6 (33.1)	1.9 (35.4)	3.6 (38.5)	5.9 (42.6)	8.9 (48.0)	10.8 (51.4)	10.6 (51.1)	8.5 (47.3)	5.7 (42.3)	2.8 (37.0)	0.2 (32.4)	5.0 (41.0)
Average precipitation mm (inches)	54.2 (2.13)	45.9 (1.81)	48.2 (1.90)	40.9 (1.61)	48.4 (1.91)	55.7 (2.19)	58.9 (2.32)	61.9 (2.44)	70.1 (2.76)	73.9 (2.91)	62.0 (2.44)	52.6 (2.07)	672.7 (26.49)
Average precipitation days (≥ 1 mm)	11.9	9.9	11.9	9.6	9.7	10.9	10.7	11.5	11.7	13.2	12.6	11.9	135.5
Source: Met Office

Climate data for Kinloss (15 km or 9 mi the west), elevation: 5 m or 16 ft, 1961–1990 normals and extremes
Month	Jan	Feb	Mar	Apr	May	Jun	Jul	Aug	Sep	Oct	Nov	Dec	Year
Record high °C (°F)	15.1 (59.2)	16.1 (61.0)	18.2 (64.8)	22.7 (72.9)	27.2 (81.0)	27.7 (81.9)	30.6 (87.1)	28.7 (83.7)	26.2 (79.2)	22.3 (72.1)	18.0 (64.4)	15.5 (59.9)	30.6 (87.1)
Mean daily maximum °C (°F)	6.2 (43.2)	6.6 (43.9)	8.6 (47.5)	10.7 (51.3)	13.8 (56.8)	16.8 (62.2)	18.1 (64.6)	17.9 (64.2)	15.6 (60.1)	12.9 (55.2)	8.5 (47.3)	6.8 (44.2)	11.9 (53.4)
Daily mean °C (°F)	3.2 (37.8)	3.2 (37.8)	5.1 (41.2)	6.8 (44.2)	9.7 (49.5)	12.7 (54.9)	14.2 (57.6)	14.0 (57.2)	12.0 (53.6)	9.4 (48.9)	5.4 (41.7)	3.8 (38.8)	8.3 (46.9)
Mean daily minimum °C (°F)	0.2 (32.4)	−0.2 (31.6)	1.6 (34.9)	2.9 (37.2)	5.7 (42.3)	8.7 (47.7)	10.4 (50.7)	10.2 (50.4)	8.5 (47.3)	5.9 (42.6)	2.3 (36.1)	0.9 (33.6)	4.8 (40.6)
Record low °C (°F)	−15.5 (4.1)	−14.4 (6.1)	−10.7 (12.7)	−7.3 (18.9)	−3.4 (25.9)	−0.5 (31.1)	1.5 (34.7)	1.3 (34.3)	−1.2 (29.8)	−3.5 (25.7)	−10.7 (12.7)	−16.0 (3.2)	−16.0 (3.2)
Average precipitation mm (inches)	53.0 (2.09)	39.0 (1.54)	46.0 (1.81)	36.0 (1.42)	46.0 (1.81)	49.0 (1.93)	55.0 (2.17)	71.0 (2.80)	58.0 (2.28)	56.0 (2.20)	62.0 (2.44)	52.0 (2.05)	623 (24.54)
Average precipitation days (≥ 1.0 mm)	10.0	8.0	11.0	9.0	9.0	9.0	10.0	12.0	12.0	12.0	12.0	12.0	126
Average snowy days	6.0	7.0	5.0	3.0	0	0	0	0	0	trace	3.0	6.0	30
Average relative humidity (%)	80.5	78.0	76.5	76.0	75.5	76.0	77.0	78.5	79.0	79.5	81.0	81.5	78.3
Mean monthly sunshine hours	42.1	75.7	104.5	136.2	167.1	162.7	147.4	134.8	104.7	84.3	49.7	35.2	1,244.4
Source: NOAA

== Demography ==
Population

Males: 10288
Females: 10641
Total: 20929

Age structure (%)

0 – 4 years: 6.35
5 – 15 years: 13.84
16 – 24 years: 9.50
25 – 44 years: 31.15
45 – 64 years: 23.08
65 – 74 years: 8.87
75+ years: 7.21

Religion (%)

Church of Scotland: 44.48
Roman Catholic: 5.96
Other Christian: 10.42
Other non-Christian: 1.08
None: 33.10
Did not answer: 4.95

Country of birth (%)

Scotland: 83.64
England: 13.13
Wales: 0.94
Other UK: 0.95
Republic of Ireland: 0.21
Other EU: 1.39
Elsewhere: 2.11

Ethnic group (%)

White Scottish: 83.64
Other White British: 13.57
Other White: 0.95
White Irish: 0.44
Pakistani: 0.42
Chinese: 0.32
Indian: 0.10
Caribbean: 0.07
African: 0.07
Black Scottish or Other Black: 0.04
Mixed background: 0.17
Other: 0.16

Source: Moray Council from 2001 Census data
Elgin's population in 1901 was 8460

== Economy ==
The Elgin–Forres–Lossiemouth triangle is heavily dependent on Royal Air Force stations for the employment of civilians. In 2005, RAF Lossiemouth along with its neighbour RAF Kinloss contributed £156.5 million (including civilian expenditure) to the Moray economy, of which £76.6 million was retained and spent locally. The bases provide, directly or indirectly, 21% of all employment in the area, although in 2010 the closure of RAF Kinloss had a significant effect on these numbers. Aware of the impact that the Air Force has on the area's economy, the local population instigated a long campaign to save RAF Lossiemouth, the future of which was also in doubt. How much of an influence this had upon the government's and Ministry of Defence's final decision is uncertain, but the base was ultimately saved and RAF Leuchars instead faced the axe as part of the same Strategic Defence and Security Review. RAF Leuchars will now become, like RAF Kinloss, an army base. Other areas offering significant employment are local authority, construction and real estate, food and drink, tourism, transport, business services and wholesale/retail.

Whisky is an important component of the wider local economy, with Glen Moray distillery, Miltonduff distillery and the BenRiach distillery all within six miles of Elgin.

In a 2006 study, Elgin was shown to be one of the most expensive towns in which to buy property in Scotland.

== Politics ==
=== National governments ===
Elgin is in the Moray West, Nairn and Strathspey constituency of the United Kingdom Parliament which returns a Member of Parliament (MP) to the House of Commons, currently Graham Leadbitter of the SNP.

Elgin is in the Moray constituency of the Scottish Parliament which has significantly different boundaries to the UK Parliament constituency. The constituency returns a Member of the Scottish Parliament (MSP) to Holyrood—currently Laura Mitchell of the SNP—and is part of the Highlands and Islands electoral region.

=== Local government ===
Elgin is represented on the Moray Council by two wards: Elgin City North and Elgin City South. Each ward elects three members using the single transferable vote system - a form of proportional representation.

=== City status ===
Elgin unsuccessfully bid to become a city as part of Elizabeth II's Platinum Jubilee celebrations in 2022. The last Scottish town to become a city was Dunfermline in 2022.

== Transport ==
Elgin is situated on the A96 trunk route which connects the cities of Aberdeen and Inverness. Heavy traffic through the town causes serious congestion. Scottish transport minister Tavish Scott visited the town in August 2006 to look at the traffic management problems and to meet campaigners for a bypass. It is estimated that a bypass would remove about one-third of traffic from Elgin's streets. The A941 runs from Lossiemouth through Elgin to Rothes, Craigellachie, Dufftown and Rhynie.

Elgin railway station is operated by ScotRail. The railway connects to Aberdeen and Inverness which have trains to other UK destinations.Ember (coach operator) pick up and drop off passengers here also providing them with a connection Inverness, Aberdeen and various towns along the A96 trunk road.

Elgin's bus station is located adjacent to the St Giles Centre and is operated mainly by Stagecoach Bluebird. It provides services within Elgin and to other local towns as well as to Aberdeen and Inverness for further travel.

The nearest airports are Inverness Airport, which has flights to mainly UK destinations, and Aberdeen Airport, which has UK and international flights.

== Education ==
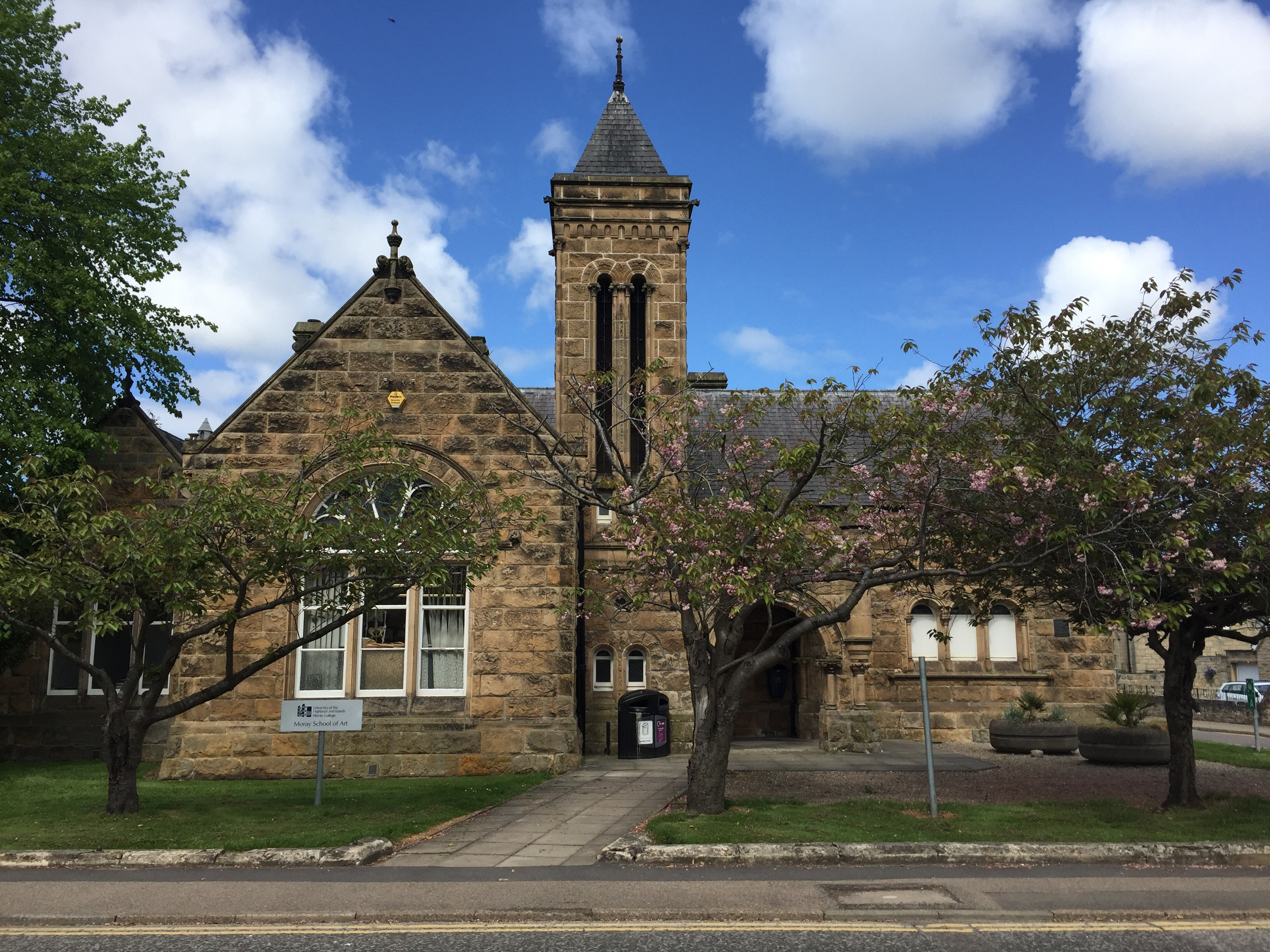
Moray School of Art

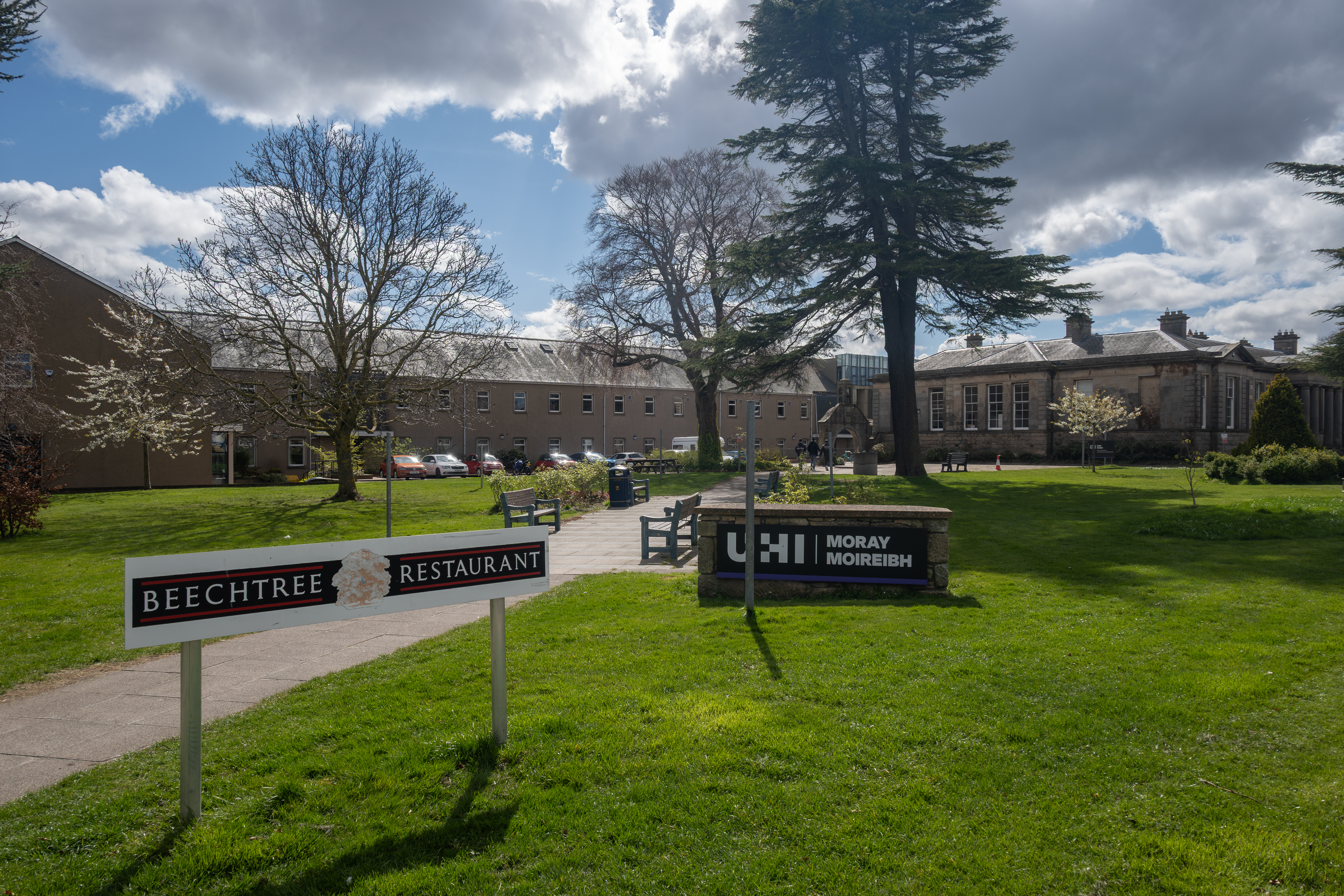
Moray College

=== Nursery schools ===
- Ark Childcare, Mosstowie
- Jack 'n' Jill Pre-School Centre, Kinder House, 22 Wardend Place, New Elgin
- Moray Leisure Centre Pre-School Nursery, Borough Briggs Road, Elgin
- Magic Roundabout Pre-School Nursery, Thornhill Drive, Elgin
- St Sylvesters Nursery
- Bishopmill Nursery
- Seafield Nursery
- Liberty Kids

=== Primary schools ===
- Aberlour House
- Bishopmill Primary School, Morriston Road, Bishopmill
- East End Primary School, Institution Road
- Greenwards Primary School, Edgar Road, New Elgin
- New Elgin Primary School, Bezack Street, New Elgin
- Seafield Primary School, Deanshaugh Terrace, Bishopmill
- West End Primary School, Mayne Road
- St Sylvester's RC Primary School, Abbey Street
- Linkwood Primary School

=== Secondary schools ===
- Elgin Academy, Morriston Road, Bishopmill
- Elgin High School, High School Drive, New Elgin
- Gordonstoun, Gordonstoun Road, Elgin

=== Further education ===
- Moray College, Moray Street, Elgin

== Community care ==
=== Hospitals ===
- Dr Gray's Hospital

=== Health centres ===
- The Maryhill Health Centre.
- Linkwood Medical at the Glassgreen Centre (Formerly the Victoria Crescent Medical Centre before its relocation in 2009)

=== Hospice ===
- The Oaks Hospice, Sherrifmill

== Religion ==
The following denominations have places of worship in Elgin:

Church of Scotland

- St Giles', High Street
- St Columba's South, Moss Street
- Birnie Kirk
- Elgin High, North Guildry Street

Free Church of Scotland

- Free Church, South Street

Baptist Union of Scotland

- Elgin Baptist Church, Reidhaven Street

Roman Catholic Church

- St Sylvester's, Institution Road
- Greyfriars Sisters of Mercy Convent in Elgin

Scottish Episcopal Church

- Holy Trinity, Trinity Place

Other denominations

- The Church of Jesus Christ of Latter-day Saints, Pansport Road
- Jehovah's Witnesses, Linkwood
- Calvary Christian Life Centre, Lesmurdie Road
- True Jesus Church, Lesmurdie Road
- Pentecostal Church of God, New Elgin Hall Annex
- Brethren, Riverside Gospel Hall, North Street
- Oasis Church COTN, The Hub, Tyock Industrial Estate
- Elgin Mosque, 1 Gordon Street.

== Culture and leisure ==
- Elgin Museum, 1 High Street
- Elgin Library, Cooper Park
- Elgin Golf Club, Hardhillock, Birnie Road
- Cooper Park: boating, pitch and putt, tennis
- Biblical Gardens
- Moray Leisure Centre, Borough Briggs Road, containing swimming pool, ice rink and a gymnasium
- Moray Sports Centre, Linkwood
- Elgin Town Hall with auditorium for production of shows
- Community Centre, Trinity Road: badminton
- The Lantern Gallery, 18 South Guildry Street
- Red Shoes Theatre and music venue, High Street
- Elgin Youth Café, Francis Place
- Moray Jazz Club, ground floor of the Elgin City Football Club, Borough Briggs Road
- Dandy Lion statue, the Plainstones

== Media ==
Television signals are received from the Knockmore transmitter.

Radio stations that broadcast to the town are BBC Radio Scotland on 92.6 FM, BBC Radio Nan Gaidheal (for Gaelic listeners) on 104.9 FM, MFR on 107.7 FM and Wave Radio, a community based station that broadcast from the Dr Gray's Hospital.

The town is served by the local newspaper, Northern Scot.

== Music ==
During the 1960s, the Beatles, the Who, Pink Floyd, Cream and Dusty Springfield all performed at the Two Red Shoes dancehall, and The Kinks played Elgin Town Hall. Oi Polloi performed at the Ocean Club on Batchen Street in April 2007, under a gazebo erected by local punks. Nowadays, the town has an underground music scene with genres including Indie, Rap, and Ambient.

== Sport ==
In August 2021, a new community sports facility consisting of a full-size football pitch and two enclosed five-a-side pitches was opened.

=== Football ===
Formed in 1893, the town's only senior football club is Elgin City, who play at Borough Briggs stadium. They entered the Highland Football League in 1895 and won the league championship fourteen times. The club entered the Scottish Football League in season 2000–01 and currently competes in Division Two. Their home colours are black and white vertical stripes, black shorts and white socks. Past famous players for Elgin City include Andy Goram, Nicky Walker, Jimmy Johnstone and John McGinlay. Recently ex-Scotland players Brian Irvine and David Robertson have managed the club.

Two junior football sides, Bishopmill United and New Elgin, both currently compete in the Scottish Junior Football North Division Two while Moray Social, Golden Pheasant and Bishopmill Villa participate in the Moray District Welfare Football Association.

=== Rugby union ===
Moray RFC was established in 1923 and play their home games at Morriston Playing Fields.

=== Cricket ===
Elgin Cricket Club plays home games on the Cooper Park cricket pitch under the auspices of North of Scotland Cricket Association.

=== Ice hockey ===
Elgin is home to the Moray Typhoons, an SNL team. They play their home games at the Moray Leisure Centre.

=== Roller derby ===
The Helgin roller derby team trains regularly in Elgin.

== Twin town ==
Elgin has been twinned with Landshut in Bavaria, Germany since 1956.

== Notable people ==
=== 13th to 17th centuries ===
- William Wiseman (fl. 1295–1309), nobleman and Sheriff of Elgin. Ancestor of Capel Wiseman of Hertfordshire (1635–1683), Bishop of the Dromore Diocese (County Down) of the Church of Ireland, who was forced to flee to the Continent following the accession of James II in 1685.

=== 18th century ===
- Alexander Brodie Spark (1792–1856), banker and merchant

=== 19th century ===
- Lt William Rennie, (1822–1887), Victoria Cross recipient
- Mary Ann Maitland (1839–1919), author
- Sir David Hardie (1856–1945), Australian medical practitioner
- John Grant (1876–1961), bagpipe musician and composer
- Margaret Hasluck (1885–1947), author and anthropologist
- James Low (1894–1960), footballer
- Masataka Taketsuru (1894–1979), Japanese whisky distiller

=== 20th century ===
- Frederick Fyvie Bruce (1910–1990), usually cited as F. F. Bruce, theologian
- Archbishop Mario Conti (1934–2022), Roman Catholic Archbishop Emeritus of Glasgow, Scotland
- Leslie Benzies (born 1971), video game designer and producer
- Kevin McKidd (born 1973), actor, director, and singer
- Steven Pressley (born 1973), former international footballer, former manager of Carlisle United and current manager of Dundee FC
- Lesley Souter (1917–1981), first female electrical engineer from the University of Glasgow
- Chris Clark (born 1980), footballer
- Richard Foster (born 1985), footballer
- Craig Duncan (born 2000), influencer
