= Elgin Sheriff Court =

Courthouse in Elgin, Scotland

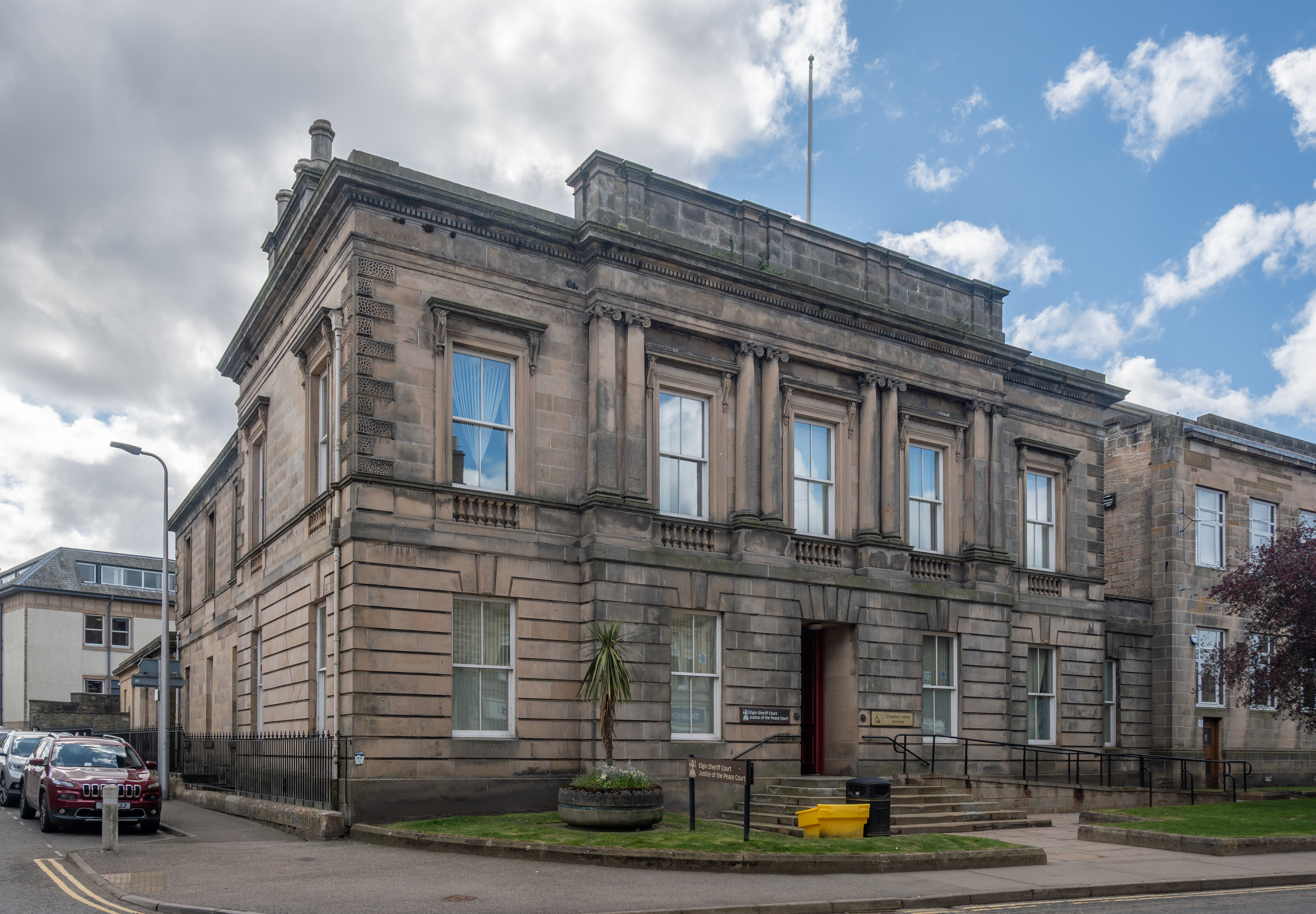
- Elgin Sheriff Court

- Shown in Moray
- 57.6487°N 3.3113°W
- Location: High Street, Elgin

History
- Built: 1866

Site notes
- Architect(s): Alexander and William Reid
- Architectural style: Neoclassical style

Listed Building – Category B
- Official name: Elgin Sheriff Court including boundary wall and railings, High Street and Glover Street, Elgin
- Designated: 20 August 1981
- Reference no.: LB30778

Elgin Sheriff Court is a courthouse in the High Street, Elgin, Moray, Scotland. The structure is a Category B listed building.

== History ==
The first judicial building in the town was a 16th century timber-framed tolbooth in the middle of the High Street in which burgh court and county meetings were held. It was rebuilt in stone the early 17th century and replaced by a combined jail, court house and town hall in the early 18th century. This, in turn, was replaced by a dedicated courthouse on the south side of the High Street which was designed by William Robertson and completed in 1837.

By the early 1860s, Robertson's courthouse was deemed inadequate, and it was decided to commission a new structure to the immediate east of the existing courthouse to be known as "County Buildings". The new building was designed by Robertson's nephews, Alexander and William Reid, in the neoclassical style, built in ashlar stone and was officially opened on 14 January 1866. The design involved a symmetrical main frontage with five bays facing onto the High Street. The central section of three bays, which slightly projected forward, featured a recessed doorway flanked by two sash windows. On the first floor, the central section was fenestrated by sash windows fronted by balustrades; the central window was flanked by Ionic order columns and the outer windows were flanked by Ionic order pilasters all supporting an entablature, a modillioned cornice and a parapet, which was originally decorated by ten urns. The outer bays were fenestrated by sash windows on both floors and were surmounted by an entablature and a modillioned cornice, but no parapet. All the windows on the ground floor, which was rusticated, featured keystones while all the windows on the first floor were surmounted by cornices supported by brackets. Internally, the principal room was a new courtroom which featured a large portrait of Sheriff-Substitute Patrick Cameron.

Following the completion of the Reid brothers' building in 1866, the 1837 building became known as the "Old Courthouse" and served as the meeting place and offices of the Commissioners of Supply, the main administrative body for the county at the time. The commissioners' functions mostly transferred to the new Elginshire County Council established in 1890 under the Local Government (Scotland) Act 1889, which also met and had its main offices at the Old Courthouse. Elginshire County Council renamed itself Moray County Council in 1919.

By the 1930s, the county council had outgrown the Old Courthouse; it was demolished and replaced by a new eleven-bay structure. Work began on the new building in 1938, but construction was interrupted by the Second World War. The new building was eventually completed in 1952, being formally opened on 18 April 1952 as the new "County Buildings". The Reid brothers' building then became known as "Elgin Sheriff Court".

After the abolition of Moray County Council in 1975, County Buildings was taken over by Moray District Council while the Reid brothers' building continued to be used for hearings of the sheriff court and, on one day a month, for hearings of the justice of the peace court. The Reid brothers' building was extended to the rear by three bays in a similar style in 1993.

== See also ==
- List of listed buildings in Elgin, Moray
