= Elgin Cathedral =

Historic ruin in Elgin, Moray, Scotland

Coordinates: 57°39′02″N 03°18′20″W

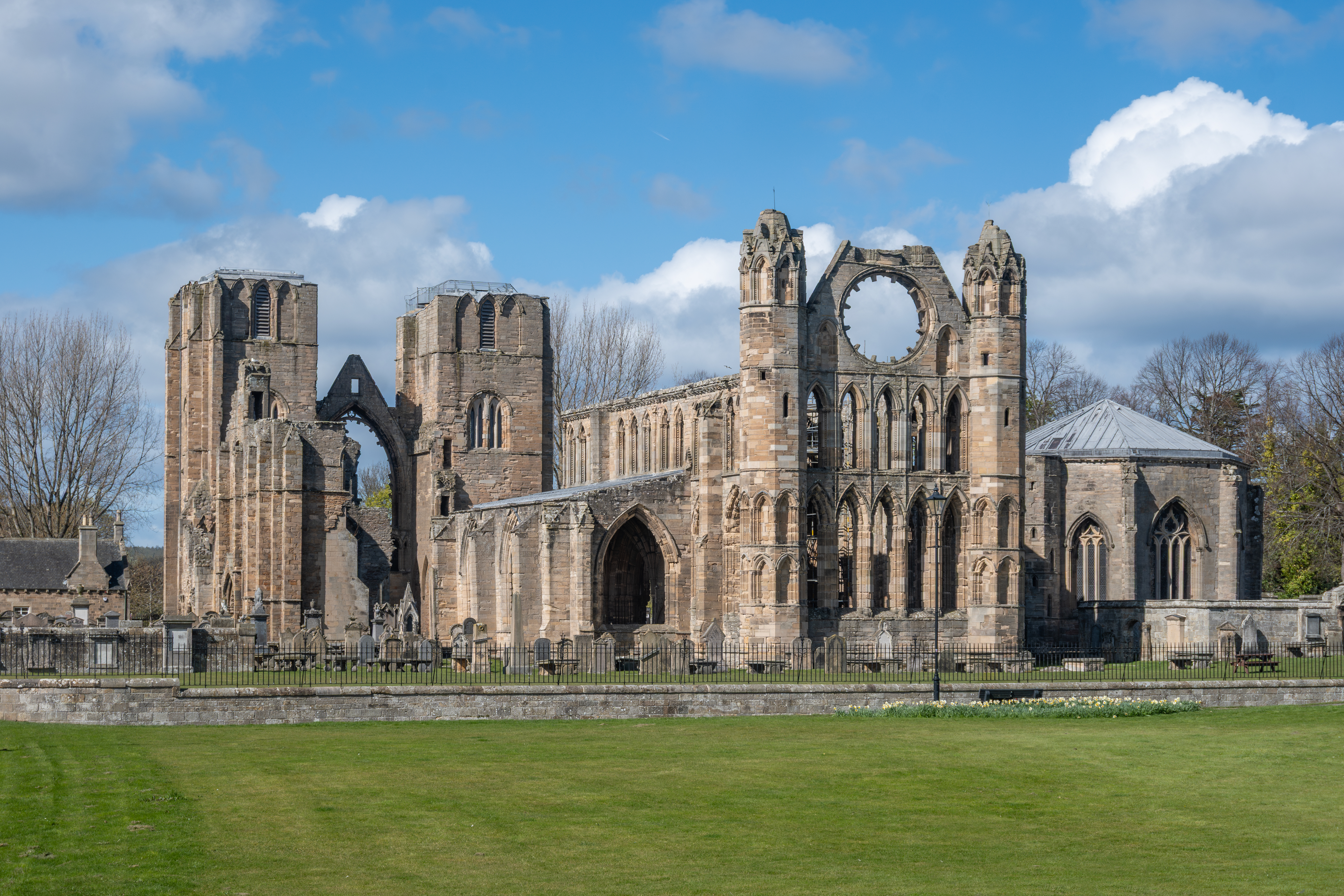
- Elgin Cathedral
- Location: Elgin, Moray
- Country: Scotland
- Denomination: Catholic

History
- Founded: 1224 (in present position)
- Founder: Bishop Andreas de Moravia
- Dedication: The Holy Trinity
- Dedicated: 19 July 1224
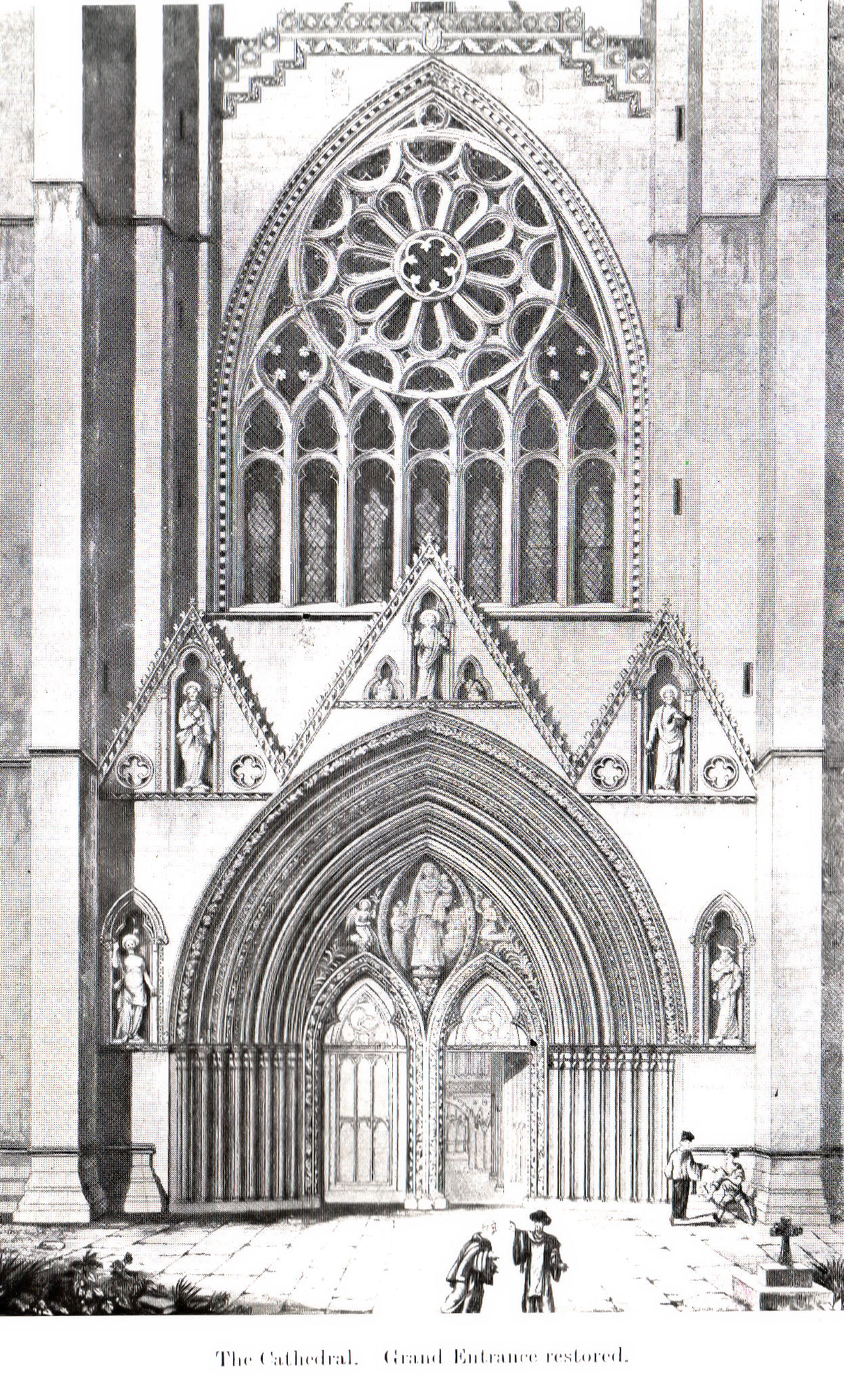
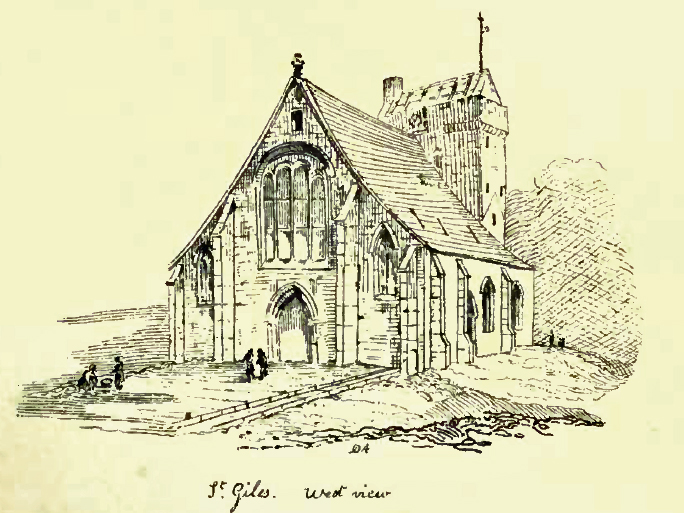
- Events: Pre-Reformation: The main west portal before the Reformation; c. 1114/15 Gregory, the first recorded Bishop of Moray, first appears in charters; 1207 Bishop Brice de Douglas gets approval for the church at Spynie to the fixed location of the cathedral; 1224 Bishop Andrew de Moravia gains approval for the move of the bishopric to Elgin; 1226 Andrew issues new constitution greatly increasing the number of canons; 1270 Destructive fire prompts significant reconstruction and enlargement; provision of new west doorway; 1362 King David II's nomination, Alexander Bur, becomes Bishop; 1390 Alexander Stewart, Earl of Buchan burns the cathedral and chanonry; central tower collapses; Bishop Bur appeals to the King for reparation for the acts of his brother; 1401 Probably late in the year, Rothesay) arrested by Albany; 1402 Alexander, Lord of Lochaber attacks cathedral; c1485 Bishop Andrew Stewart completes chapter house refurbishment; 1560 Parliament abolishes Mass; Bishops now use St Giles Church in Elgin; Post-Reformation: St Giles Kirk; 1561 'popish trappings' removed from cathedral; 1567–1568 Roof lead and bells removed by order of parliament; 1573 Patrick Hepburn, the last Catholic bishop of Moray died; 1637 Roof covering the choir collapses; 1640 The minister of St Giles church dismantled the Rood screen for firewood; 1707 William Hay, the last bishop of Moray died; Union of the Parliaments; 1711 Central tower collapsed destroying nave; 1823 A Pictish cross-slab found near St Giles Church is moved to the Cathedral; 1824 Crown funded the roofing of the chapter house supervised by Robert Reid; 1824–1826 John Shanks, a cobbler of Elgin, shifted '2853 cubic yards of rubbish' from cathedral grounds; 1834 Extensive reinforcement and repairs to walls under supervision of Robert Reid; 1841 John Shanks died and is buried in the cathedral cemetery; 1857 The Pans Port gate refurbished and anachronistically ornamented; c. 1912 The brewery on the east bank of the River Lossie and directly opposite the cathedral is removed; 1938 The Pans Port and an existing section of the original precinct wall taken into public ownership; 1954 The Precenter's Manse taken into public ownership; 1972–1989 chapter house window tracery replaced and glazed and re-roofed; 1998–2000 Restoration of interior of north and south towers completed

Architecture
- Functional status: Ruin
- Architectural type: Cathedral
- Style: Gothic

Administration
- Diocese: Moray (est. x1114–1127x1131)
- Deanery: Elgin; Inverness; Strathspey; Strathbogie

Clergy
- Bishop(s): (Of significance); Brice de Douglas; Andrew de Moravia; Alexander Bur; Patrick Hepburn

Scheduled monument
- Designated: 6 February 1995
- Reference no.: SM90142
- Category: Ecclesiastical

Elgin Cathedral, also known as the Lantern of the North (Scots: Lantern o the North), is a historic ruin in Elgin, Moray, in northeast Scotland. Established in 1224 on land granted by King Alexander II, it was the seat of the bishops of Moray. It replaced the cathedral at Spynie, located 3 kilometres (2 mi) to the north, and was served by a small chapter of eight clerics. By 1226, the expanding cathedral was staffed with 18 canons, a number that increased to 23 by 1242.

Even then, the cathedral was regarded as a fine example of contemporary architecture, described as the "ornament of the realm" and the "glory of the kingdom". It was also the second-largest cathedral in Scotland, after St Andrews. It experienced major building phases. The first followed an extensive fire in 1270 and then again after an incendiary attack in 1390 by Alexander Stewart, Earl of Buchan, later known as the "Wolf of Badenoch". The resulting structure featured a massive west front with twin towers and an impressive choir and presbytery, which also integrated an octagonal chapter house.

By 1560, the year of the Scottish Reformation, the canonry reached its zenith with the number rising to 25. However, this also marked the beginning of the cathedral's decline when its congregation was moved to the parish church of St Giles. In 1567, the Privy Council ordered the removal of the lead that covered the roof to help fund the army. This exposed the interior to the elements. Significant structural failures followed, including the collapse of the choir roof in 1637 and the collapse of the central tower in 1711, destroying most of the nave.

Major conservation and refurbishment work, begun in the early 19th century, continued until the late 20th century and has been followed by ongoing stabilisation work. Today, Elgin Cathedral is a scheduled monument managed by Historic Environment Scotland. Despite its ruined state, much of the 13th-century west front and the 15th-century chapter house remain intact. The site is a major visitor attraction and contains extensive collections of medieval stone carvings and a 9th-century Pictish cross-slab found nearby.

== Early church in Moray ==
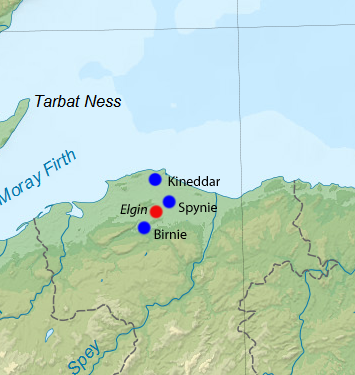
The first cathedrals of Moray

The Diocese of Moray was a regional bishopric, distinct from the pre-eminent see of the Scottish church, St Andrews, which had evolved from a more ancient monastic Celtic tradition and administered dispersed localities. The existence of bishops of Moray before c. 1120 remains uncertain. The earliest known prelate—possibly later translated to Dunkeld—was Gregory (or Giric, in Gaelic) and was probably bishop in name only. Gregory was a signatory to the foundation charter of Scone Priory, issued by Alexander I (Alaxandair mac Maíl Choluim) between December 1123 and April 1124, and again in a subsequent charter defining the legal rights of the same institution. His final recorded appearance occurs as a witness to a charter granted by David I to Dunfermline Abbey in c. 1128. These are the only known details of Gregory, with no basis for later assertions that he was a promoted monk in a 'Pictish Church'.

After the suppression of Óengus of Moray's rebellion in 1130, King David likely regarded the continued existence of a bishopric in Moray as essential to the province's stability. The next bishop, William (1152–1162), was an absentee titular figure, having been David's chaplain since 1136. His tenure appears to have contributed little to diocesan stability before he died in 1162.

Felix was the next bishop and is thought to have been prelate from 1166 to 1171, although precise dates remain uncertain. Little is known about his tenure, with only one instance of him appearing as a witness in a charter of William the Lion at his court held in Elgin.

After Felix's death, Simon de Toeni— a kinsman of King William and former abbot of Coggeshall in Essex—became the next bishop. Bishop Simon was the first of the early bishops to adopt an active role in managing his diocese. It has been asserted that he was buried in Birnie Kirk, near Elgin, after his death on 17 September 1184, although this claim did not emerge until the 18th century.

Simon was succeeded by Richard of Lincoln, another royal clerk, who faced considerable challenges to build up the revenues of the bishopric during and after the insurgency of Domnall mac Uilleim (Donald MacWilliam). Richard is regarded as the first significant resident bishop of Moray.

During this early period, these bishops lacked a permanent cathedral site and were successively located at Birnie, Kinneddar, and Spynie. On 7 April 1206, Pope Innocent III issued an apostolic bull authorising bishop Brice de Douglas to fix his cathedral church at Spynie. The inauguration was held between spring 1207 and summer 1208. A chapter of five dignitaries and three ordinary canons was instituted, modelled on the constitution of Lincoln Cathedral. During the reign of David I, Elgin emerged as the lay provincial centre, likely with the establishment of the first castle. The castle's superior security likely drove Brice's petition to the Pope, before July 1216, to move the seat from Spynie to Elgin.

== Cathedral church at Elgin ==
=== Foundation and development ===
Although Bishop Brice had previously petitioned for the relocation of the episcopal seat to Elgin, it was not until the episcopate of Andrew de Moravia that Pope Honorius III issued a bull on 10 April 1224 authorising an inquiry into the suitability of the move. His appointed legates, Gilbert de Moravia, Bishop of Caithness, Robert, Abbot of Kinloss, and Henry, Dean of Ross, approved the undertaking. The translation ceremony was conducted by the Bishop of Caithness and the Dean of Ross on 19 July 1224. Earlier, on 5 July, King Alexander II (Alaxandair mac Uilliam) had issued a writ consenting to the transference, referencing a previous land grant he had made specifically for this purpose. Although the grant predates the papal mandate and may suggest that construction had begun before Brice's death, this is considered unlikely. It is generally accepted that Bishop Andrew initiated the building works on a previously unoccupied site.

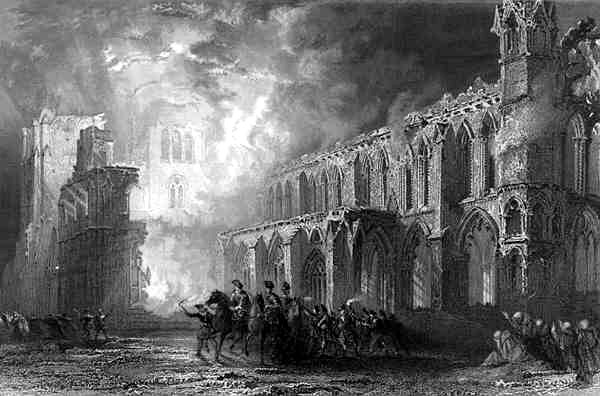
19th-century depiction of the burning of Elgin Cathedral

The initial construction of the cathedral was completed after 1242. Chronicler John of Fordun recorded (without explanation) that in 1270 the cathedral church and the canons' houses were destroyed by fire. The cathedral was rebuilt in a larger and grander style, forming the greater part of the structure that stands today. This work is believed to have been completed by the outbreak of the Wars of Scottish Independence in 1296. Although Edward I of England took his army to Elgin in 1296 and again in 1303, the cathedral remained untouched, as it did during his grandson Edward III during his assault on Moray in 1336.

Soon after his election to the see in 1362–1363, Bishop Alexander Bur requested funds from Pope Urban V to repair the cathedral, citing neglect and hostile attacks. In August 1370 Bur began protection payments to Alexander Stewart, Lord of Badenoch, also known as the Wolf of Badenoch, who became Earl of Buchan in 1380, and who was the son of the future King Robert II. Numerous disputes between Bur and Buchan led to Buchan's excommunication in February 1390. The bishop then turned for protection to Thomas Dunbar, the son of the Earl of Moray. In response, and possibly out of frustration at the reappointment of his brother Robert Stewart, Earl of Fife as guardian of Scotland, Buchan descended from his island castle on Lochindorb and burned the town of Forres in May and Elgin, including the cathedral and its manses, in June. It is believed that he also burned Pluscarden Priory at that time, which was under the bishop's protection. Bur sought reparation from Robert III for his brother's actions in a letter stating:

my church was the particular ornament of the fatherland, the glory of the kingdom, the joy of strangers and incoming guests, the object of praise and exaltation in other kingdoms because of its decoration, by which it is believed that God was properly worshipped; not to mention its high bell towers, its venerable furnishings and uncountable jewels.

Robert III granted Bur an annuity of £20 for his lifetime, and the Pope provided income from the Scottish Church over the following decade. In 1400, Bur complained to the Abbot of Arbroath about prebendary churches in the Moray diocese failing to pay their dues for the cathedral restoration. In the same year, Bur wrote to the rector of Aberchirder church, advising him that he now owed three years' arrears of the subsidy imposed on non-prebendary churches in 1397. Once again, on 3 July 1402, the burgh and cathedral precinct were attacked, this time by Alexander of Lochaber, brother of Domhnall of Islay, Lord of the Isles, sparing the cathedral but burning the manses. For this, Lochaber and his captains were excommunicated, prompting his return in September to make reparations and gain absolution.

In 1408, money saved during an ecclesiastical vacancy was diverted to the rebuilding process, and in 1413, a grant was made from the customs of Inverness. Increasingly, the appropriation of parish church revenues led many churches to become dilapidated and unable to attract educated clergy. By the later Middle Ages, the standard of pastoral care outside the main burghs had declined significantly.

Bishop John Innes (1407–1414) made significant contributions to the cathedral's rebuilding efforts, as evidenced by the inscription on his tomb, which praises his work. Upon his death, the chapter met secretly—"in quadam camera secreta in campanili ecclesie Moraviensis" ("in the same secret chamber in the bell tower of Moray church")—and agreed that if one of its members was to be elected bishop, they would provide one-third of the bishopric income annually until the reconstruction was completed. Major alterations to the west front were completed before 1435 and bear the coat of arms of Bishop Columba de Dunbar (1422–1435). The north and south aisles of the choir were likely completed before 1460, with the south aisle containing the tomb of John de Winchester (1435–1460). The final significant feature to be rebuilt was the chapter house between 1482 and 1501, which displays the arms of Bishop Andrew Stewart.

=== Cathedral offices ===
Large cathedrals needed many clerics to staff daily services across the many chapel altars. Bishop Andrew initially allowed for seventeen vicars—seven priests, five deacons and five sub-deacons—though this number was later increased to twenty-five. In 1350, the stipends of the vicars proved insufficient, prompting Bishop John of Pilmuir to supplement their income from two churches and the patronage of another from Thomas Randolph, 2nd Earl of Moray. By 1489, the stipends varied significantly: one vicar received 12 marks, six received 10, one received 8, three received 7, and six received 5. Each vicar was employed by a canon, who was obligated to provide four months' notice in the event of termination of his service. Vicars were of two kinds: the vicars-choral who served in the choir for the main services and the chantry chaplains who served individual foundation altars, though at times duties overlapped. The chapter followed the constitution of Lincoln, but its liturgical form adhered to the Sarum Rite, as practised at Salisbury Cathedral. Records indicate that disciplinary measures, including fines and even corporal punishment, were imposed on the vicars-choral for any shortcomings. The punishments were administered in the chapter house by the sub-dean and witnessed by the chapter. King Alexander II founded a chaplaincy for the soul of King Duncan I who died in battle with Macbeth near Elgin. The chapel most frequently mentioned in records was St Thomas the Martyr, located in the north transept and supported by five chaplains. Other chaplaincies documented are those of the Holy Rood, St Catherine, St Duthac, St Lawrence, St Mary Magdalene, St Mary the Virgin and St Michael.

By Bishop Bur's episcopate (1362–1397), the cathedral had 15 canons (excluding dignitaries), 22 vicars-choral and a similar number of chaplains. Despite these numbers, not all canons were regularly present. Absences were common when ambitious clerics accepted positions in other cathedrals. Canons were appointed to be either always present or to attend on a part-time basis. At Elgin, the dean was permanently resident, while the precentor, chancellor and treasurer served for half the year. Non-permanent canons were required to attend for three continuous months. Time spent away from the chanonry was regulated. In 1240, the chapter legislated to penalise canons who persistently absented themselves in breach of their agreements by deducting one-seventh of their income. For example, in 1488, many canons failed to adhere to the terms of their leave of absence, resulting in each of them receiving a formal warning and being summoned to appear before the chapter. Despite this, ten canons refused to attend, leading to a deduction of one-seventh of their prebendary income. In the Diocese of Aberdeen, and likely in other bishoprics as well, when important decisions needed to be made by the chapter, an absentee canon had to appoint a procurator to act on their behalf. One of the dignitaries was normally chosen for this role, as he was more likely to be present.

The bishops maintained high standards. They ensured that there was a significant number of graduate clerics among the choir vicars and chaplains who could act as proxies for absentee canons. Consequently, much of the workload fell to vicars and the smaller number of resident canons who celebrated high mass, delivered sermons, and organised feast day processions. Seven services were held daily, mostly for the clergy, and took place behind the rood screen, which separated the high altar and choir from lay worshippers. Only cathedrals, collegiate churches and large burgh churches were resourced to perform the more elaborate services, while services in the humbler parish churches were more basic. In addition to those in holy orders, clerks and lawyers recorded and executed chapter business. Artisans—masons, carpenters, and glaziers—maintained the fabric of the buildings, while domestic staff, such as housekeepers, cooks, husbandry workers and gardeners, sustained the precinct population. At the bishop's residence at Spynie, the household was substantial, with officials administering the bishop's estate, and servants working in the service buildings, such as the kitchen, bakehouse, brewhouse, granary, and stables.

=== Chanonry and burgh ===
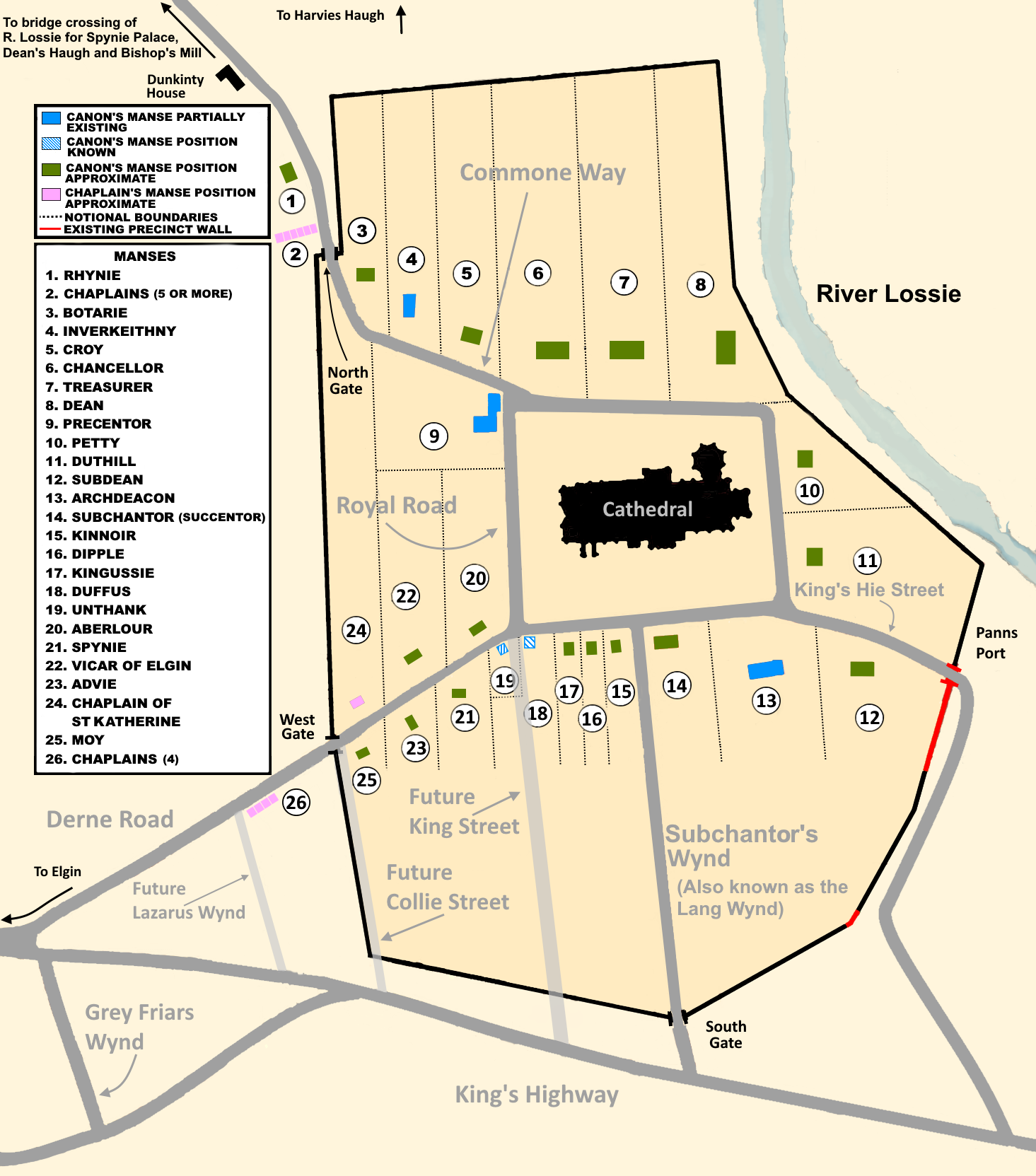
The College of the Chanonry of Elgin

==== Map interpretation ====
The description of the relative positions of the chanonry manses provided by the late 19th- and early 20th‑century antiquarian, the Rev. Stephen Ree, forms the basis for this map. It is constructed using a 19th‑century Ordnance Survey (OS) town map of Elgin as its base layer and preserves the road layout, which has changed little since medieval times. While extraneous detail has been removed, the map otherwise preserves standard cartographic proportions and accuracy. The college boundary walls and Ree's data have been applied.

Although modified over time, three manses still exist: Inverkeithny, the Precentor's, and the Archdeacon's (positions 4, 9 and 13, respectively). Two further manses—Duffus and Unthank (positions 18 and 19)—can be accurately located by juxtaposing the pre‑Reformation and post‑Reformation chanonry layouts. To facilitate this, King Street (established in 1830) is rendered as a transparent overlay to preserve detail. King Street divided the two properties, placing them on opposite corners at its intersection with North College Street (shown on the map as Derne Road). Neither manse was recessed into its garden; rather, each formed part of its respective property boundary. (Note: Young, who described the positions of Duffus and Unthank manses as being at the north corners of King Street, so does Watson, and Mackintosh.)

Mackintosh also includes two images that indicate both manses (positions 18 and 19), but before King Street was established. In the first, Unthank is shown in detail with Duffus partly hidden behind it, and North College Street curving into the Cathedral perimeter road. In the second, the Duffus Manse is shown in equal detail with Unthank Manse, partly obscured, behind it. Again, the road curvature reveals Unthank Manse rotated away, viewed almost side‑on. The images also demonstrate that neither manse was set back from the road and that their frontages formed part of the property boundaries.

These five manses provide fixed reference points, allowing the placement of the others. While the exact positioning, alignment and other characteristics of the missing manse boundaries remain speculative, they correspond exactly with Stephen Ree's description. Similarly, aside from the two existing sections, the precise course of the chanonry wall is uncertain; however, a notable indicator of its original line is a six‑foot‑thick segment reportedly incorporated into a house on Collie Street.

==== College of Elgin and associated locations ====
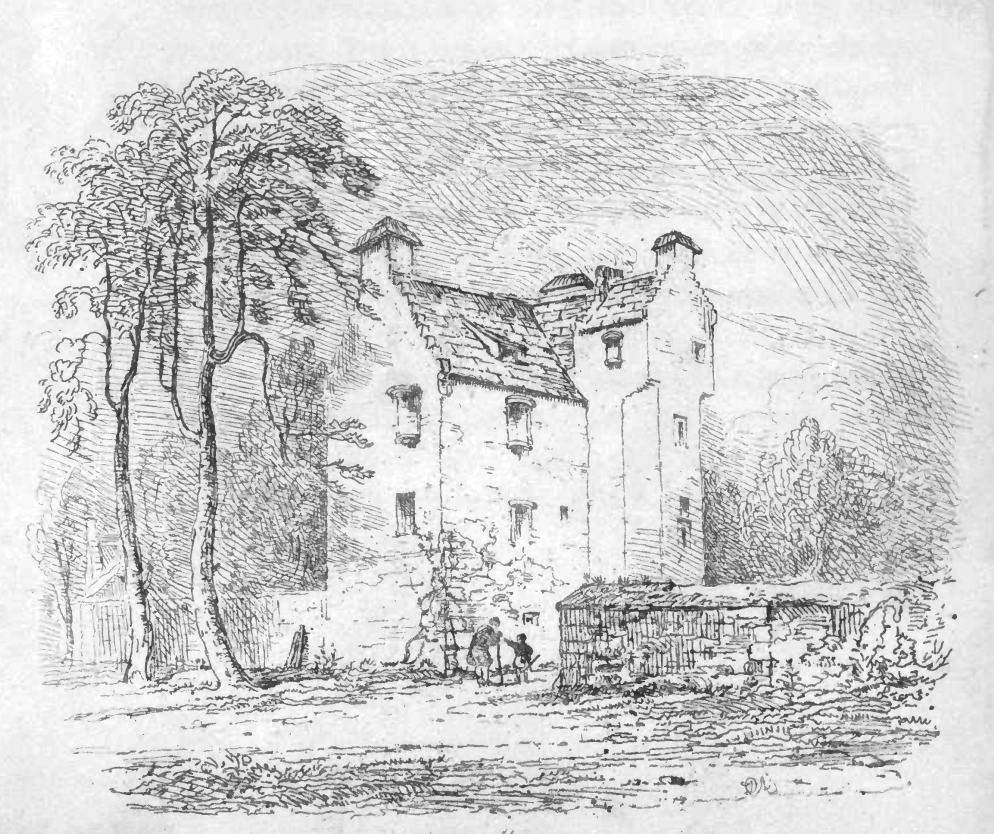
Duffus Manse

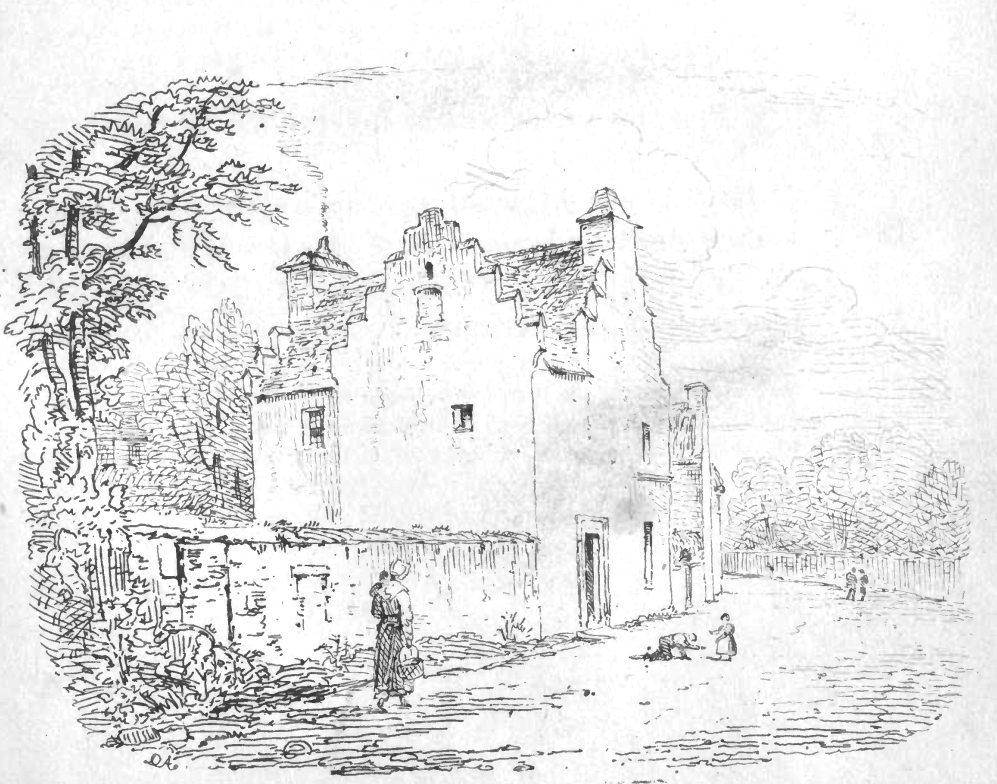
Unthank Manse

The chanonry—referred to in cathedral records as the college of the chanonry (collegio canonicatus), or simply as the college (collegium)—comprised the cathedral and the residences of canons, vicars, and chaplains arranged around it. This precinct was enclosed by a substantial wall, reportedly over 3.5 metres (11 ft) in height, approximately 2 metres (6 ft 7 in) in thickness, and extending to a length of about 820 metres (2,690 ft).

The wall had four gatehouses:

- the west gate, providing access to and from the burgh;
- the south gate, facing the lands of the hospital of Maison Dieu and connecting with the King's Highway;
- the extant east gate, or Panns Port, which led to the meadowland known as Le Pannis and illustrates the portcullis defences typical of the gatehouses (Fig. 1);
- and the north gate, providing a more direct route to the bishop's mill and his Spynie Palace.

Although the manses were typically situated within the precinct walls, there were exceptions. On 14 December 1360, Bishop John Pilmuir (1326–1362) gifted a parcel of land—acquired from a secular clerk—to house four chaplains. The land, feued from the Brothers of St Lazarus, lay outside the west wall, along the road to the burgh of Elgin and between two lanes, one of which may have been the proto‑Lazarus Wynd (position 26). With his death approaching, Pilmuir stipulated that the chaplains should pray for the redemption of his soul and those of his parents. Separately, the manse of Rhynie stood outside the west wall to the north, along with the manses of five or more chaplains (positions 1 and 2).

Bishop Andrew Stewart (1482–1501), the youngest son of James Stewart of Lorne and Joan Beaufort, the widow of James I of Scotland, was a significant figure during the reign of his nephew, James III. Following the death of James in 1488, Bishop Andrew found himself out of favour at James IV's court, allowing him to spend more time in his diocese. In May 1489, he convened a general convocation of his canons to implement long‑overdue repairs to the college buildings and their environs. Among these was the approval of essential maintenance of two gatehouses—the Panns Port and the west gate to the burgh—and the insertion of a new gateway (the North Gate) into the precinct wall beside the manse of Botarie (position 3). Andrew also directed thirteen prebendaries—including the archdeacon and the succentor—under the threat of fines to “erect, construct, build, and duly repair their manses, and the enclosures of their gardens within the college of Moray”. (Note: Bishop Andrew Stewart in his convocation of 1489 was annoyed at the dilapidation of the precinct and that both the Panns Port and the West Gate to the Burgh were non‑functional and in need of repair. That left the South Gate as the only fully working access and egress point for the chanonry. This was unacceptable and may have been the reason for his demand that a new gate be constructed adjacent to the Manse of Botarie. He was also unhappy that some manses, perhaps nonexistent since the burnings of 1390 and 1402, had still not been replaced. Thirteen canons, including some dignitaries, faced large fines if rectification was delayed. The nearness of the new gate would have been a benefit for the Manse of Rhynie and may account for its externality from the precinct following Bishop Andrew's warnings.)

The Manse of Duffus, in its earlier wooden form, hosted two monarchs: Edward I of England on 10 and 11 September 1303, after the castle became unusable, and King James II of Scotland in 1455. As already noted, the manse of the precentor, often mistakenly referred to as the Bishop's House, (Note: The Precentor's manse was granted to Alexander Seton simultaneously with his appointment as lay commendator of Pluscarden Priory. In 1604 he became Chancellor of Scotland and then 1st Earl of Dunfermline in 1606. He renamed the manse to Dunfermline House and became Provost of Elgin (1591–1607) and then Provost of Edinburgh (1598–1608). He died in 1622. See Byatt, Elgin: A History, p. 21) is partly ruined and is dated 1557 (Fig. 2). Traces of the prebendary of Inverkeithny's manse and the Archdeacon's manse (Fig. 3) are now part of private buildings.

There were two friaries in the burgh. The Dominican friary of Black Friars was founded in the western part of the town below the castle to its north, around 1233. The friary of the Franciscan Grey Friars (Friars Minor Conventual) was later founded in the eastern part of the burgh sometime before 1281. It is thought that this foundation did not last long but was followed between 1479 and 1513 by a house of Observantine Grey Friars. The building was transferred into the ownership of the burgh around 1559 and later became the Court of Justice in 1563. In 1489, the chapter founded a school that served not only as a song school for the cathedral but also to provide an education in music and reading for some children of Elgin.

The hospital of Maison Dieu, dedicated to St Mary, was situated near the cathedral precinct and was established by Bishop Andrew de Moravia before 1237 for the aid of the poor. It suffered fire damage in 1390 and again in 1445. Initially, the cathedral clerks received it as a benefice, but it gradually fell into disrepair due to a lack of support. Bishop James Hepburn granted it to the Blackfriars of Elgin on 17 November 1520, possibly to try and ensure its survival. After the Reformation, the Crown took ownership of the property, and in 1595, James VI granted it to the burgh for educational and charitable purposes. In 1624, it was replaced by an almshouse, but in 1750 it was substantially damaged during a storm and lay in ruins until its demolition during a 19th‑century redevelopment of the area.

== Diocese ==
=== Organisation ===
The chapter comprised all dignitaries and canons and had the primary role of assisting the bishop in the governing of the diocese. Following Moray's adoption of the constitution of the Lincoln diocese, the bishop's role within the chapter was limited to that of an ordinary canon. Instead, leadership rested with the dean. This arrangement was also the same for the bishops of Aberdeen, Brechin, Caithness, Orkney and Ross. Each morning, the canons met in the chapter house, where a reading from the Rule of St Benedict preceded the day's business discussion. Bishop Brice's chapter of eight clerics was modest compared with that of his successor. Bishop Andrew de Moravia substantially expanded the chapter by appointing two additional senior positions—the succentor and subdean—and by appointing sixteen additional canons with prebends. By the time Andrew died, the chapter comprised twenty‑three prebendary canons; two more were added before the Reformation. Churches were either situated on ecclesiastic lands or granted to the diocese by lay patrons and were subject to appropriation to canons as prebends. The de Moravia family, to which Bishop Andrew belonged, contributed greatly to the provision of these endowments.

The Dean of Christianity supervised the parish clergy within his deanery and implemented the bishop's directives. The Moray diocese was divided into four deaneries: Elgin, Inverness, Strathspey and Strathbogie. The parish churches within these deaneries provided income not only for the cathedral and chapter but also for other religious houses within and outside the diocese. Most churches were provided to individual canons, with a smaller number held communally. The bishop received mensal and prebendary revenues from parish churches in his separate capacities as prelate and canon.

Governance of the diocese, encompassing both clerical and lay matters, was vested entirely in the bishop. He appointed officials to oversee ecclesiastical, criminal, and civil courts. In collaboration with the chapter, the bishop promulgated diocesan statutes and regulations, which were enforced at diocesan synods either by the bishop himself or, in his absence, by the dean. He appointed officials who adjudicated at consistory courts dealing with matters affecting tithes, marriages, divorces, widows, orphans, wills, and other related legal issues. In Moray, these courts convened in Elgin and Inverness. By 1452, the Bishop of Moray held all his lands in a single regality with Courts of Regality, presided over by bailiffs and deputies who ensured the collection of revenues from his estates.

=== Possessions ===
As well as being the ecclesiastical head of the diocese, the bishops of Moray also possessed significant secular powers as prominent feudal lords. Their landed estates were extensive in significant areas of the Highlands and along the southern reaches of the Moray Firth. The bishops, representing religious and secular authority, played an important role in solidifying royal governance and stability in a historically volatile region. The importance of this relationship was recognised on 8 November 1451 when James II provided Bishop John Winchester with the Barony of Spynie, enabling the consolidation of the disparate church lands and other properties into a single entity. On 15 August 1452, the king elevated the barony into a regality. This provided the bishop with wide‑ranging powers including the convening of courts of law capable of adjudicating crimes that had previously fallen solely under the jurisdiction of the king's legal officer, the Sheriff. While the 1390 fire destroyed many charters that likely contained significant details regarding the attainment of land grants from royalty and the aristocracy, the surviving documents offer valuable insights into this process. However, the Barony of Spynie charter of 1451 named and defined much, but not all, of the diocesan lands.

Some of the unspecified lands only became apparent during their transference into tenancies or, in some cases, litigation against transgressors. Additional records provide information regarding diocesan lands held by notable leaseholders obliged to pay the bishop homage. These actions typically occurred following events such as the appointment of a new bishop or the emergence of a new heir to relevant lands. Although these occasions were largely symbolic as the lands had normally been granted in perpetuity, they did demonstrate the lengths the bishops went to retain their privileges as secular overlords. The records also provide details of the lands that once were held exclusively by the church but had then been transformed into lease holdings. Land transfer had mainly arisen in the turbulent period from the mid‑14th to the early 15th centuries. But even during this time, the bishops strongly defended their rights when secular lords tried encroaching on church lands.

The bishops retained properties that were important to their needs and those of their households. These included elevated areas immediately north of Elgin, considered part of the bishops' demesne, and comprised the lands of Spynie, where the bishop's palace was, and the adjoining barony of Kinneddar. Outside of these areas, church lands were widely dispersed. The lengthy River Spey entered the Moray Firth some 14 kilometres (9 mi) to the east of Elgin. On its east side lay church lands within the upland territories in the Strathbogie including the bishops' mensal barony of Keith (Strathisla). The lands extended southwards into the highland territories on the river's upper reaches of Strathspey and in its catchment area spreading as far south as Logynkenny near the diocesan border with the lordship of Lochaber. West of the Spey, churchlands were present in areas along the fertile coastal plain between Elgin and Inverness and then down both sides of the Great Glen. The highland hinterland also contained church holdings in Glenfiddich, Strathavon, the Findhorn Valley, Strathnairn, and Badenoch.

== Post–Reformation ==
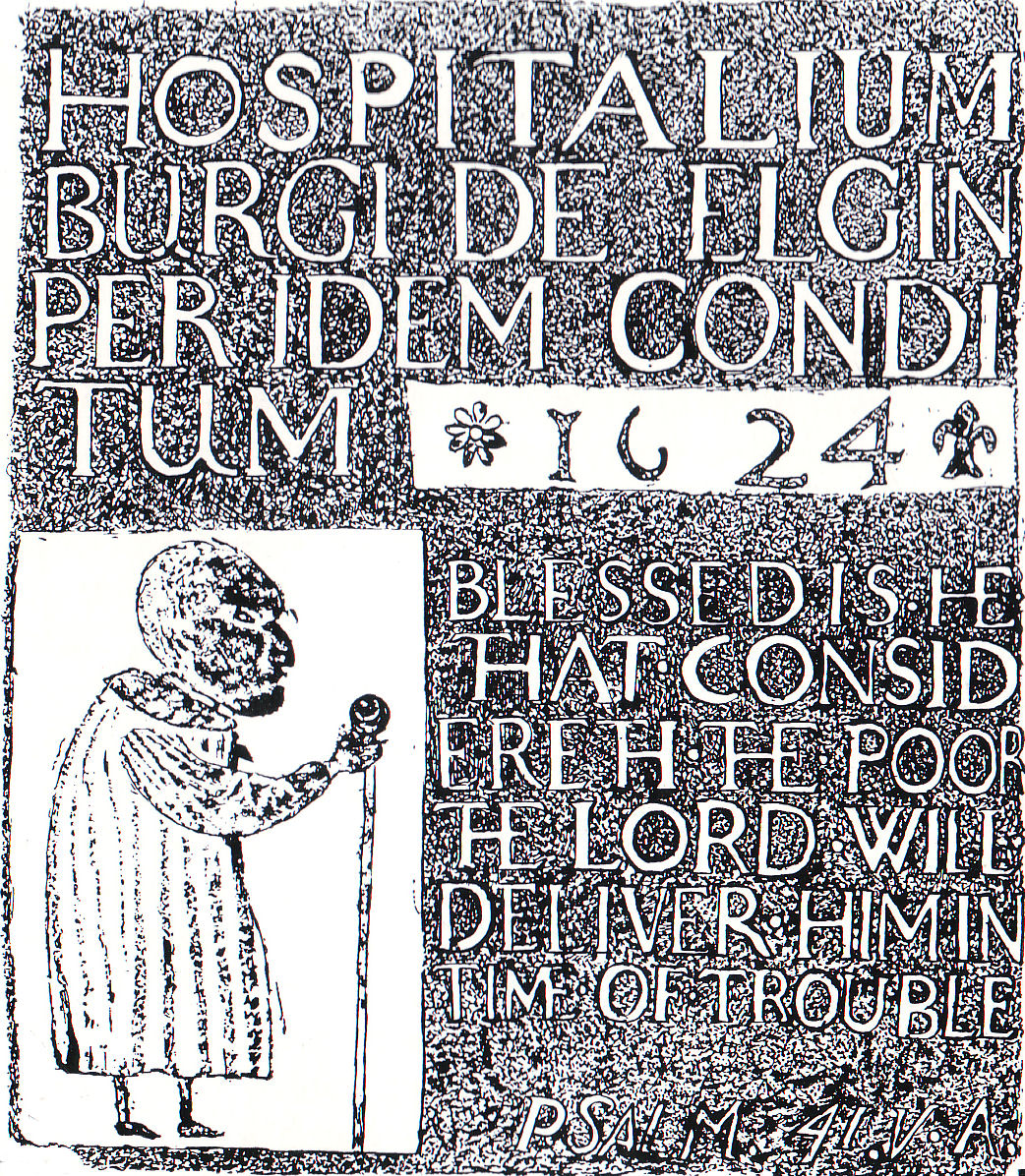
The almshouse date stone

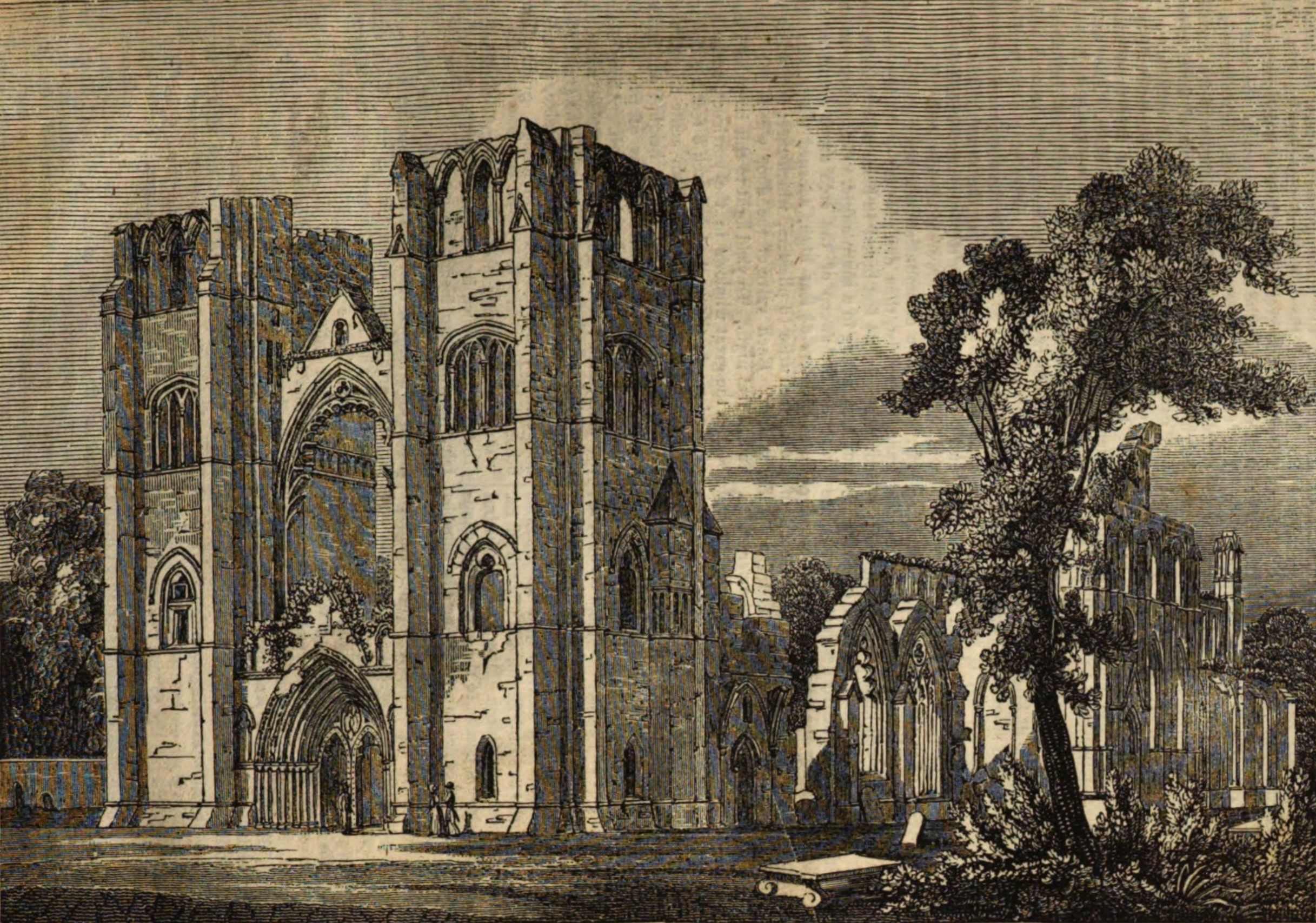
1835 woodcut of the cathedral ruins from The Penny Magazine, a few years after the completion of John Shank's clearing work

In August 1560, Parliament gathered in Edinburgh to enact legislation declaring the Scottish church to be Protestant, removing papal authority, and making the Catholic mass illegal. At that time, the cathedral's canons were supported by thirty‑nine parish churches, with the majority of the canons holding more than one prebendary church. A total of sixty‑two clerics were attached to the cathedral. In addition to the twenty‑four canons—six of whom were pluralists and may therefore have been serving elsewhere—the remaining community comprised twenty‑four vicars and fourteen chaplains. It is estimated that at least eighty clerics, including unbeneficed curates, were employed in the parishes.

Cathedral buildings survived only if used as parish churches and, as Elgin had been fully served by the Kirk of St Giles, its cathedral was abandoned. On 14 February 1567, an act of Parliament authorised Regent Lord James Stewart's Privy Council to remove the lead from the roofs of Elgin and Aberdeen cathedrals to be sold to support the army, but the ship carrying the cargo to Holland capsized in Aberdeen harbour. Regent Moray and Patrick Hepburn, Bishop of Moray ordered repairs in July 1569, appointing Hew Craigy, Parson of Inverkeithing, as master of the work and was to collect contributions from the canons—none were made.

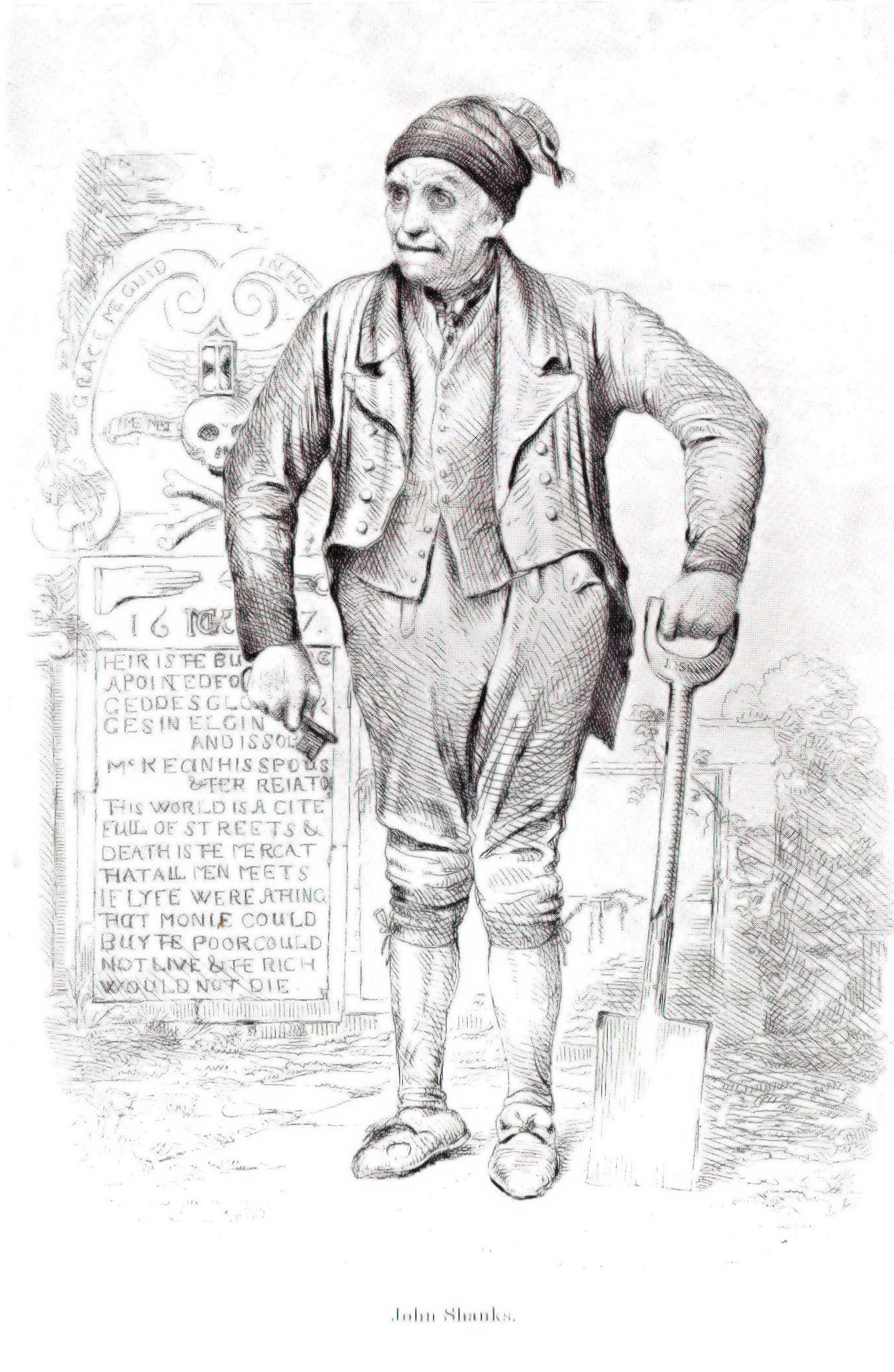
John Shanks

In 1615, John Taylor, the "Water Poet", described Elgin Cathedral as a "fair and beautiful church with three steeples", though its roofs, windows, and many marble monuments and tombs were already broken and defaced. Decay continued: the eastern limb roof collapsed in a storm on 4 December 1637. In 1640, the General Assembly ordered the removal of the rood screen, which divided the choir from the nave, and was chopped up for firewood. The destruction of the great west window was attributed to Oliver Cromwell's soldiers between 1650 and 1660.

The cathedral grounds became Elgin's cemetery; in 1685, the town council repaired the boundary wall but forbade the use of the cathedral stone. Despite the building's increasing instability, the chapter house continued to be used by Incorporated Trades from 1671 to 1676 and again from 1701 to around 1731. No stabilisation was carried out, and on Easter Sunday 1711, the central tower collapsed, demolishing the nave. Stonework was then quarried for local projects. Artists sketched the ruins, capturing the continued ruination. By the closing years of the 18th century, travellers began visiting the site; in 1773 Samuel Johnson recorded having been given a pamphlet outlining the cathedral's history.

After the abolition of bishops in 1689, ownership passed to the crown, but the building's decline continued. Acknowledging this, the Elgin Town Council initiated the reconstruction of the perimeter wall in 1809 and cleared the surrounding debris in about 1815. The Lord Provost petitioned the King's Remembrancer for assistance to build a new roof for the chapter house, and in 1824, £121 was provided to the architect Robert Reid for its construction. Reid later became the first Head of the Scottish Office of Works (SOW). It was probably during his tenure at the SOW that the supporting buttresses to the choir and transept walls were built.

In 1824, John Shanks, an Elgin shoemaker and an important figure in conserving the cathedral, cleared the grounds of centuries of rubbish dumping and rubble. Shanks was officially appointed the site's Keeper and Watchman in 1826. Although his work was highly valued at the time and brought the cathedral back into public focus, his unscientific clearance methods may have resulted in the loss of much valuable evidence of the cathedral's history. He died on 14 April 1841, aged 82.

Minor works continued in the 19th and early 20th century. In the 1930s, a protective roof was installed over the vaulted ceiling of the south choir aisle. From 1960 onwards, decayed sandstone was replaced and new windows fitted in the chapter house, which was re‑roofed to preserve its vaulted ceiling. From 1988 to 2000, significant renovations were carried out on the two western towers, including the establishment of a viewing platform at the top of the north tower.

== Building phases ==
=== Construction 1224–1270 ===
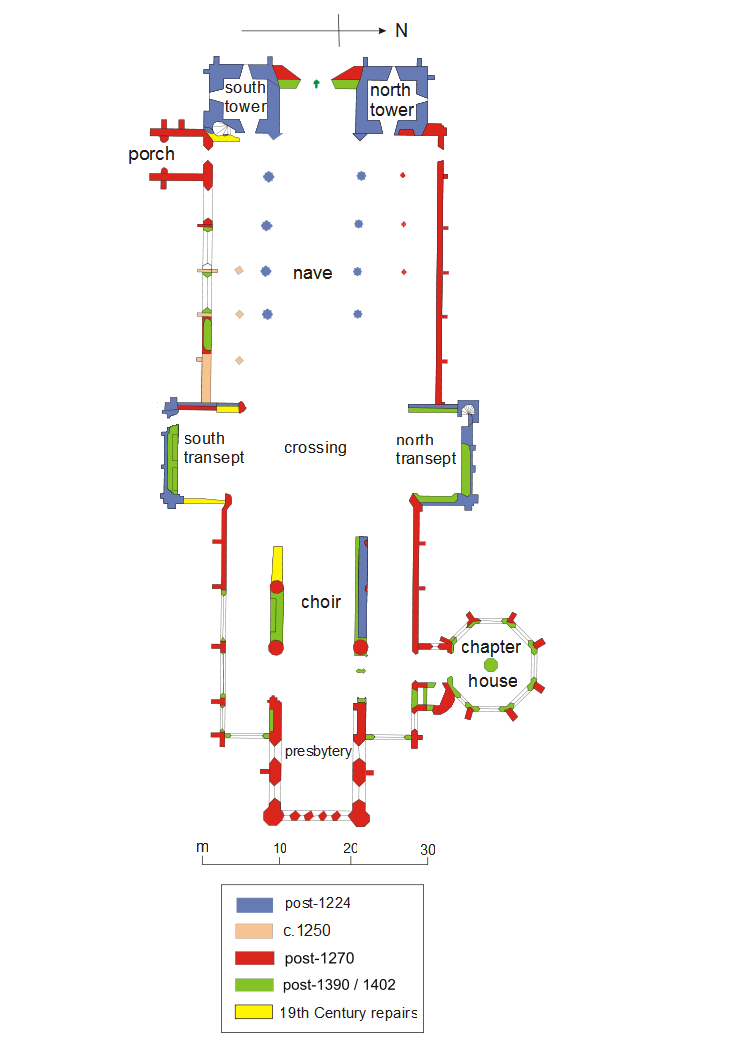
Construction phases

The first church was markedly cruciform and smaller than the present floor plan. This early structure had a choir without aisles and more truncated, and a nave with only a single aisle on its north and south sides (Fig. 4). The central tower rose above the crossing between the north and south transepts and may have held bells in its upper storey. The north wall of the choir is the earliest extant structure, dating to the years immediately after the church's 1224 foundation; the clerestory windows on top of it are from the later post‑1270 reconstruction. This wall has blocked‑up windows extending to a low level above ground, indicating that it was an external wall and proving that the eastern limb then had no aisle (Fig. 5).

The south transept's southern wall is nearly complete, displaying the fine workmanship of the first phase. It shows the Gothic pointed arch style in the windows that first appeared in France in the mid‑12th century and was apparent in England around 1170, but hardly appeared in Scotland until the early 13th century. It also shows the round early Norman window design that continued to be used in Scotland during the entire Gothic period (Fig. 6). The windows and the quoins are of finely cut ashlar sandstone. A doorway in the southwest portion of the wall has large mouldings and has a pointed oval window placed above it. Adjacent to the doorway are two lancet‑arched windows that are topped at the clerestory level with three round‑headed windows. The north transept has much less of its structure preserved, but much of what does remain, taken together with a study by John Slezer in 1693, shows that it was similar to the south transept, except that the north transept had no external door and featured a stone turret containing a staircase.

The west front has two 13th‑century buttressed towers 27.4 metres (90 ft) high that were originally topped with wooden spires covered in protective lead. Although the difference between the construction of the base course and the transepts suggests that the towers were not part of the initial design, it is likely that the building process was not so far advanced that the masons could fully integrate the nave and towers into each other (Fig. 7).

=== Enlargement and reconstruction after 1270 ===
After the fire of 1270, a programme of reconstruction was launched, with repairs and a major enlargement. Outer aisles were added to the nave, the eastern wing comprising the choir and presbytery was doubled in length and had aisles provided on its north and south sides, and the octagonal chapter house was built off the new north choir aisle (Figs. 8 & 9). The new northern and southern aisles ran the length of the choir, past the first bay of the presbytery, and contained recessed and chest tombs. The south aisle of the choir contained the tomb of Bishop John of Winchester, suggesting a completion date for the reconstructed aisle between 1435 and 1460 (Fig. 10). Chapels were added to the new outer aisles of the nave and were partitioned from each other with wooden screens. The first bay at the west end of each of these aisles and adjacent to the western towers did not contain a chapel but instead had an access door for the laity.

In June 1390, Alexander Stewart, Robert III's brother, burned the cathedral, manses and burgh of Elgin. This fire was very destructive, requiring the central tower to be completely rebuilt along with the principal arcades of the nave. The entire western gable between the towers was reconstructed and the main west doorway and chapter house were refashioned. The internal stonework of the entrance is late 14th or early 15th century and is intricately carved with branches, vines, acorns and oak leaves. A large pointed arch opening in the gable immediately above the main door contained a series of windows, the uppermost of which was a circular or rose window dating between 1422 and 1435. Just above it can be seen three coats of arms: on the right is that of the bishopric of Moray, in the middle are the Royal Arms of Scotland, and on the left is the armorial shield of Bishop Columba Dunbar (Fig. 11). The walls of the nave are now very low or even at foundation level, except one section in the south wall which is near its original height. This section has windows that appear to have been built in the 15th century to replace the 13th‑century openings: they may have been constructed following the 1390 attack (Fig. 12). Nothing of the elevated structure of the nave remains, but its appearance can be deduced from the scarring seen where it attached to the eastern walls of the towers. Nothing of the crossing now remains following the collapse of the central tower in 1711. Elgin Cathedral is unique in Scotland in having an English‑style octagonal chapter house and French‑influenced double aisles along each side of the nave; in England, only Chichester Cathedral has similar aisles. The chapter house, which had been attached to the choir through a short vaulted vestry, required substantial modifications and was now provided with a vaulted roof supported by a single pillar (Figs. 13 & 14). The chapter house measures 10.3 metres (34 ft) high at its apex and 11.3 metres (37 ft) from wall to opposite wall; it was substantially rebuilt by Bishop Andrew Stewart (1482–1501), whose coat of arms is placed on the central pillar. Bishop Andrew was the half‑brother of King James II. The delay in the completion of these repairs until this bishop's episcopacy demonstrates the extent of the damage from the 1390 attack.

=== 19th and 20th century stabilisation ===
In 1847–1848 several of the old houses associated with the cathedral on the west side were demolished, and some minor changes were made to the boundary wall. Structural reinforcement of the ruin and some reconstruction work began in the early 20th century, including restoration of the east gable rose window in 1904 and the replacement of the missing form pieces, mullions, and decorative ribs in the window in the north‑east wall of the chapter house (Fig. 15). By 1913, repointing the walls and additional waterproofing of the wall tops were completed. In 1924 the ground level was lowered and the 17th‑century tomb of the Earl of Huntly was repositioned. Further repairs and restoration ensued during the 1930s, including the partial dismantling of some 19th‑century buttressing (Fig. 16), the reconstruction of sections of the nave piers using recovered pieces (Fig. 17), and the addition of external roofing to the vault in the south choir in 1939 (Fig. 18). From 1960 to 2000, masons restored the cathedral's crumbling stonework (Fig. 19) and between 1976 and 1988, the window tracery of the chapter house was gradually replaced, and its re‑roofing was completed (Fig. 20). Floors, glazing, and a new roof were added to the southwest tower between 1988 and 1998 and comparable restoration work was completed on the northwest tower between 1998 and 2000 (Fig. 21).

== Burials ==
- Andrew de Moravia – buried in the south side of the choir under a large blue marble stone
- David de Moravia – buried in the choir
- William de Spynie – buried in the choir
- Andrew Stewart (d. 1501)
- Alexander Gordon, 1st Earl of Huntly
- Columba de Dunbar (c. 1386 – 1435) was Bishop of Moray from 1422 until his death
- George Gordon, 1st Duke of Gordon and his wife Lady Elizabeth Howard

== Referenced figures ==
Remains of chanonry
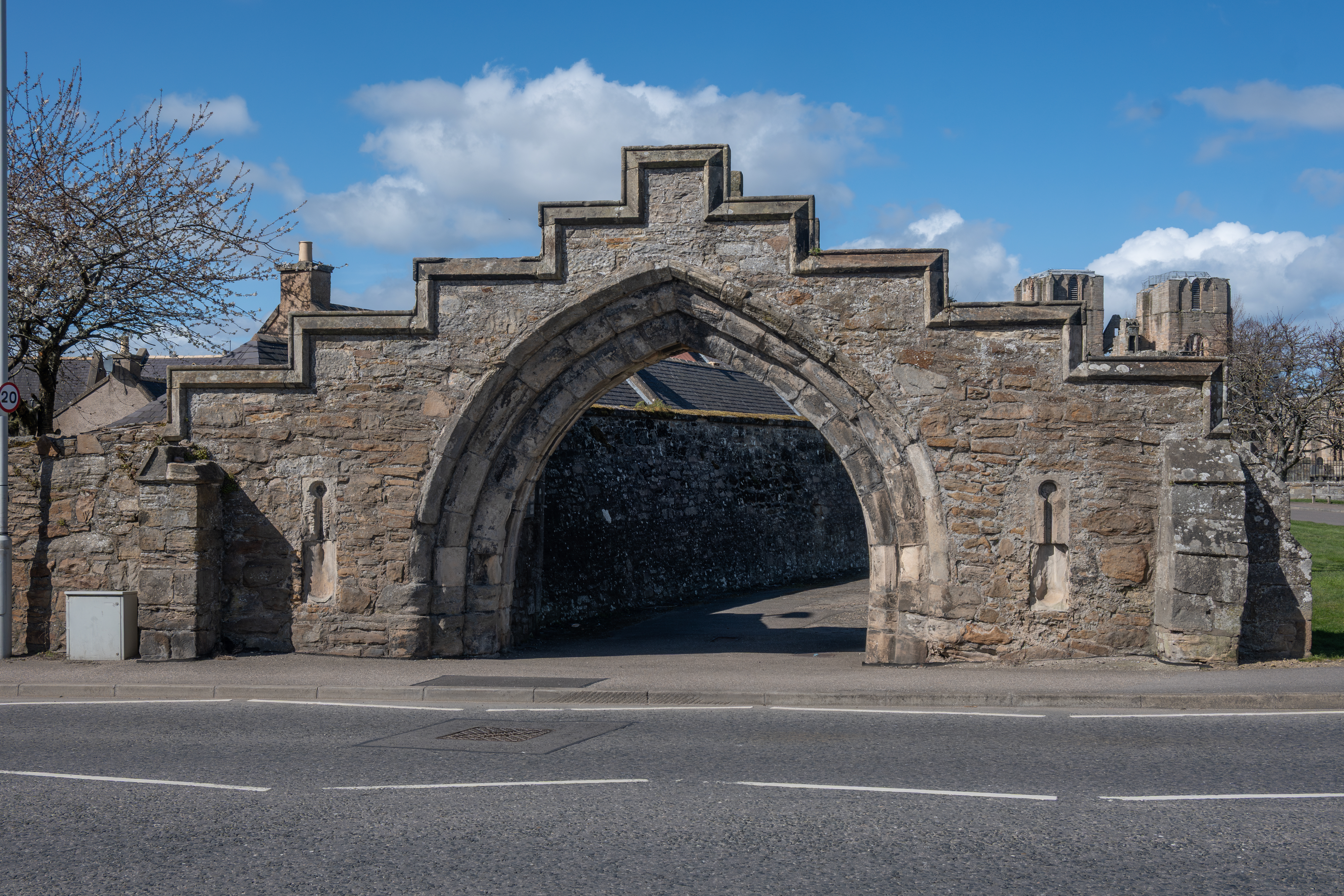
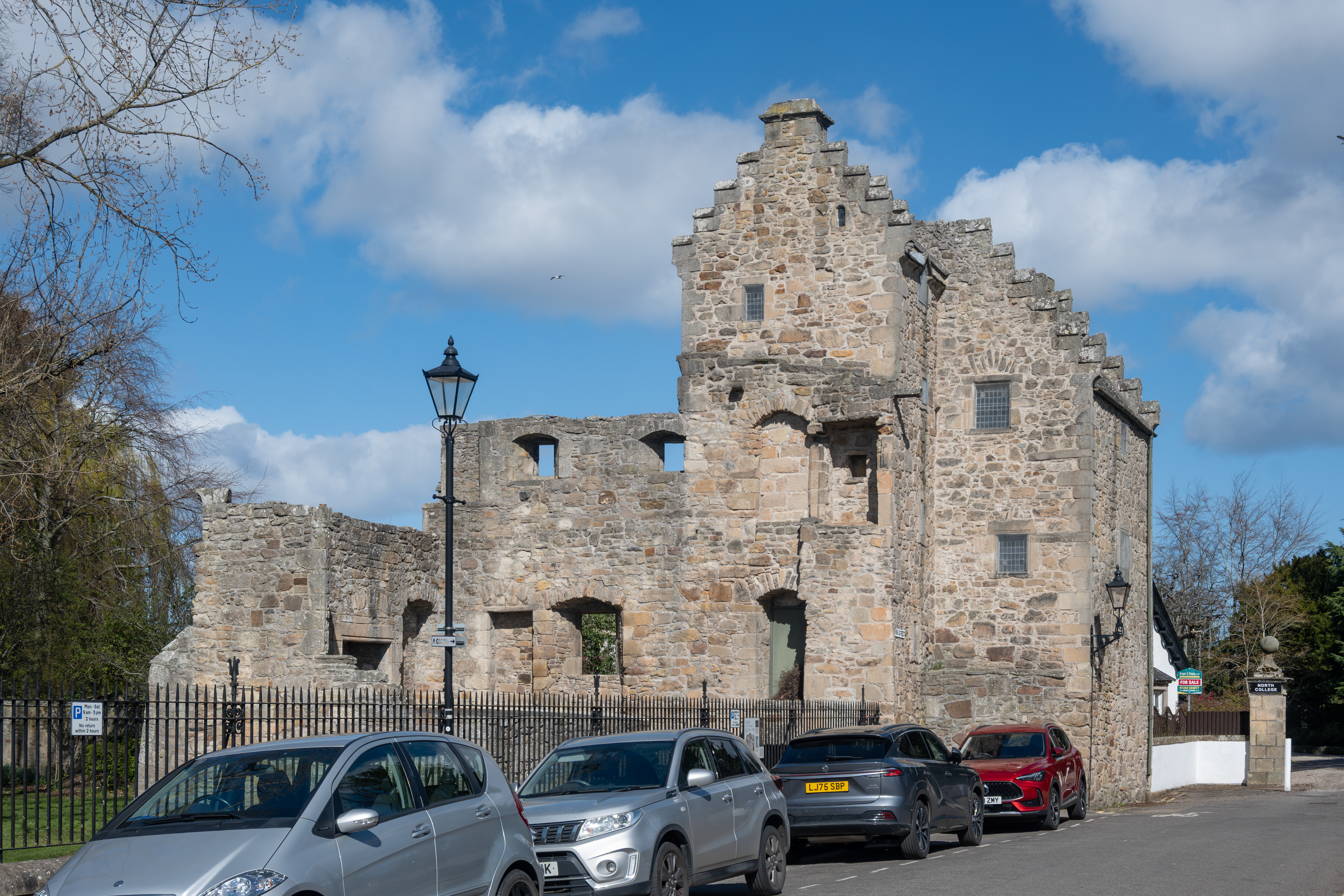
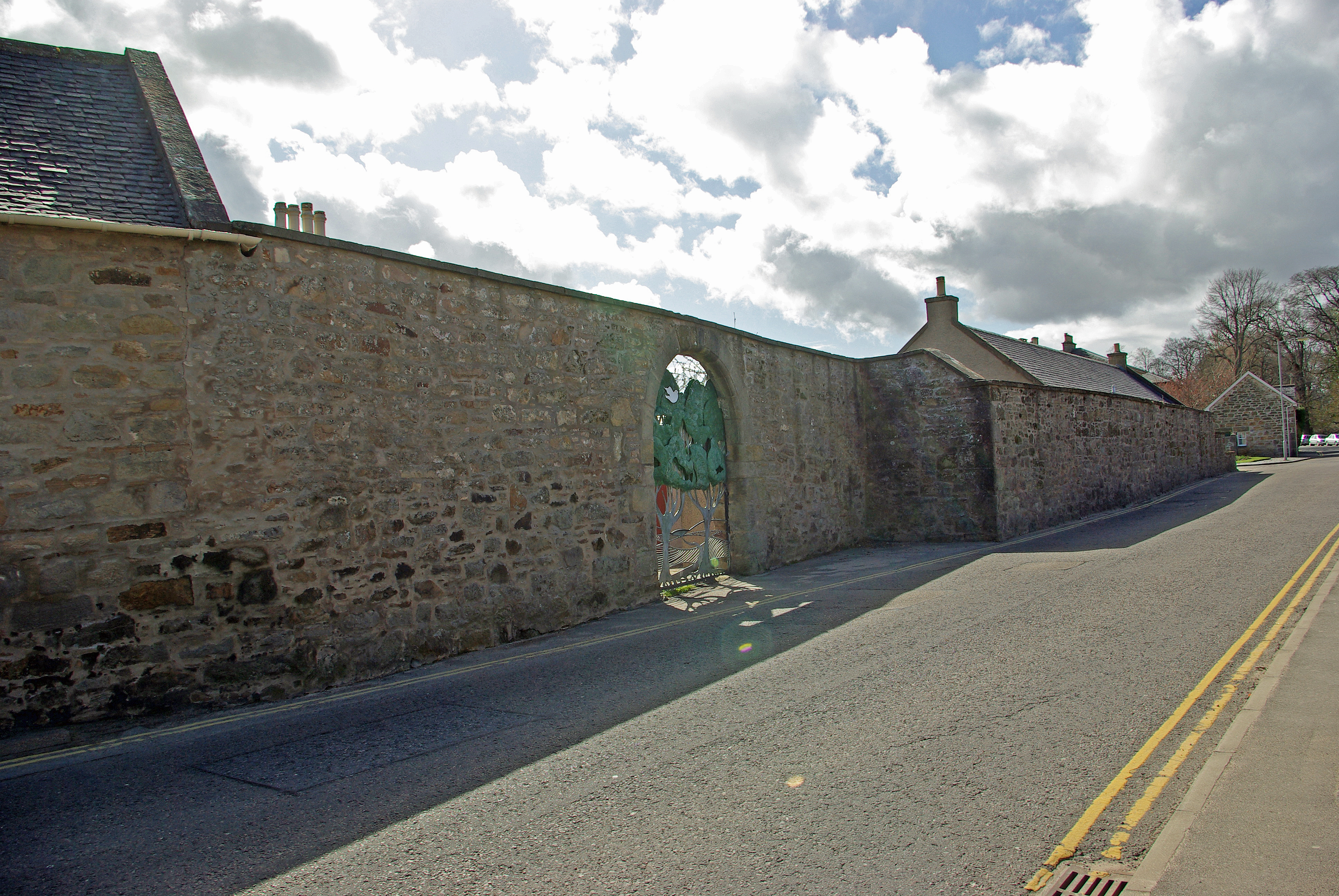
Fig. 1	Fig. 2	Fig. 3
The Pans Port	The Precentor's manse "Bishop's House"	The boundary wall of the Archdeacon's manse with rounded arch gate

Building 1224 – 1270
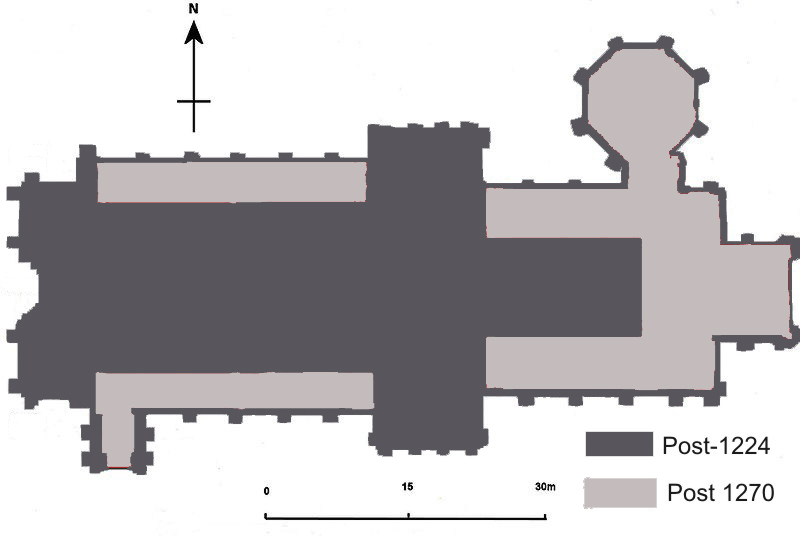
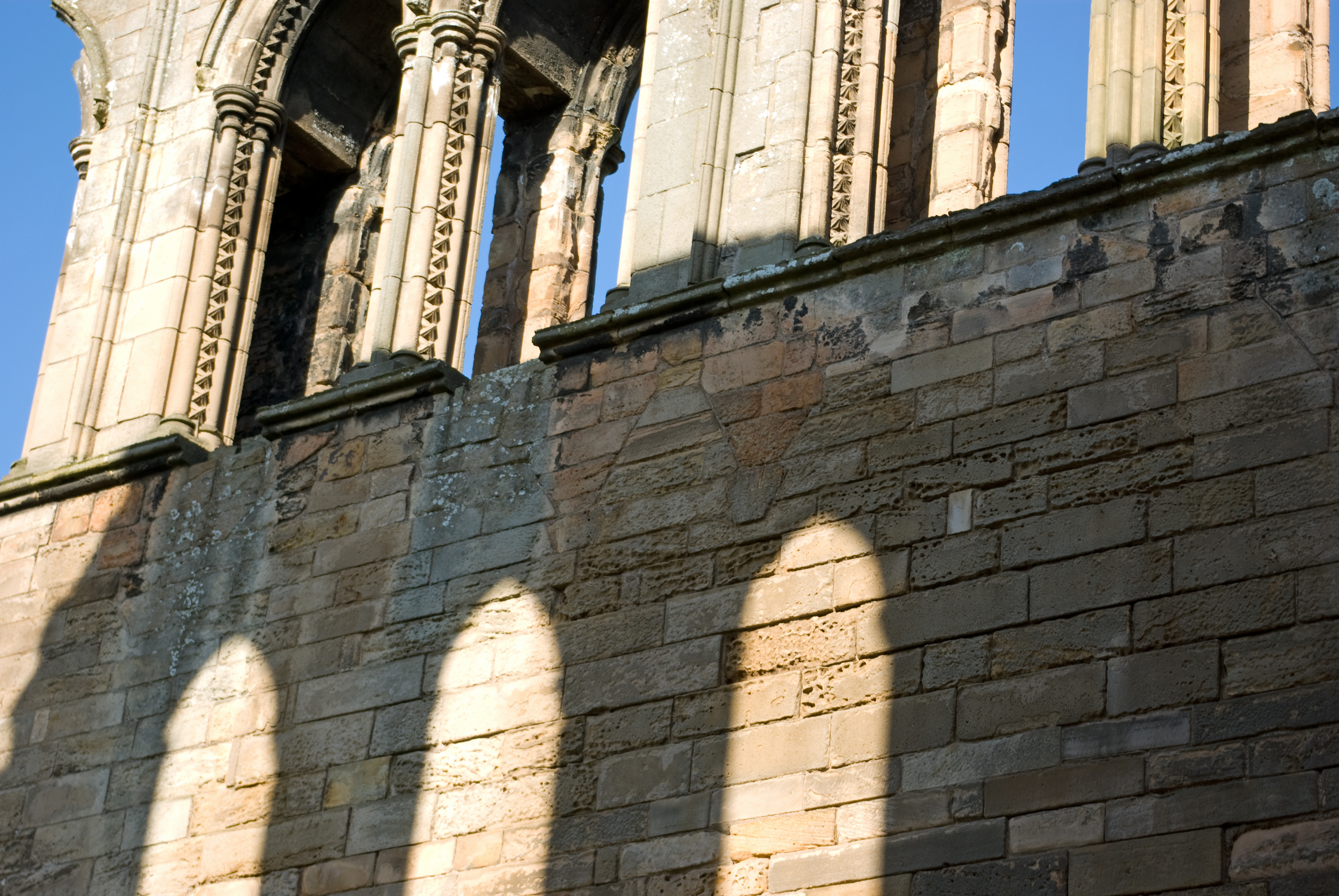
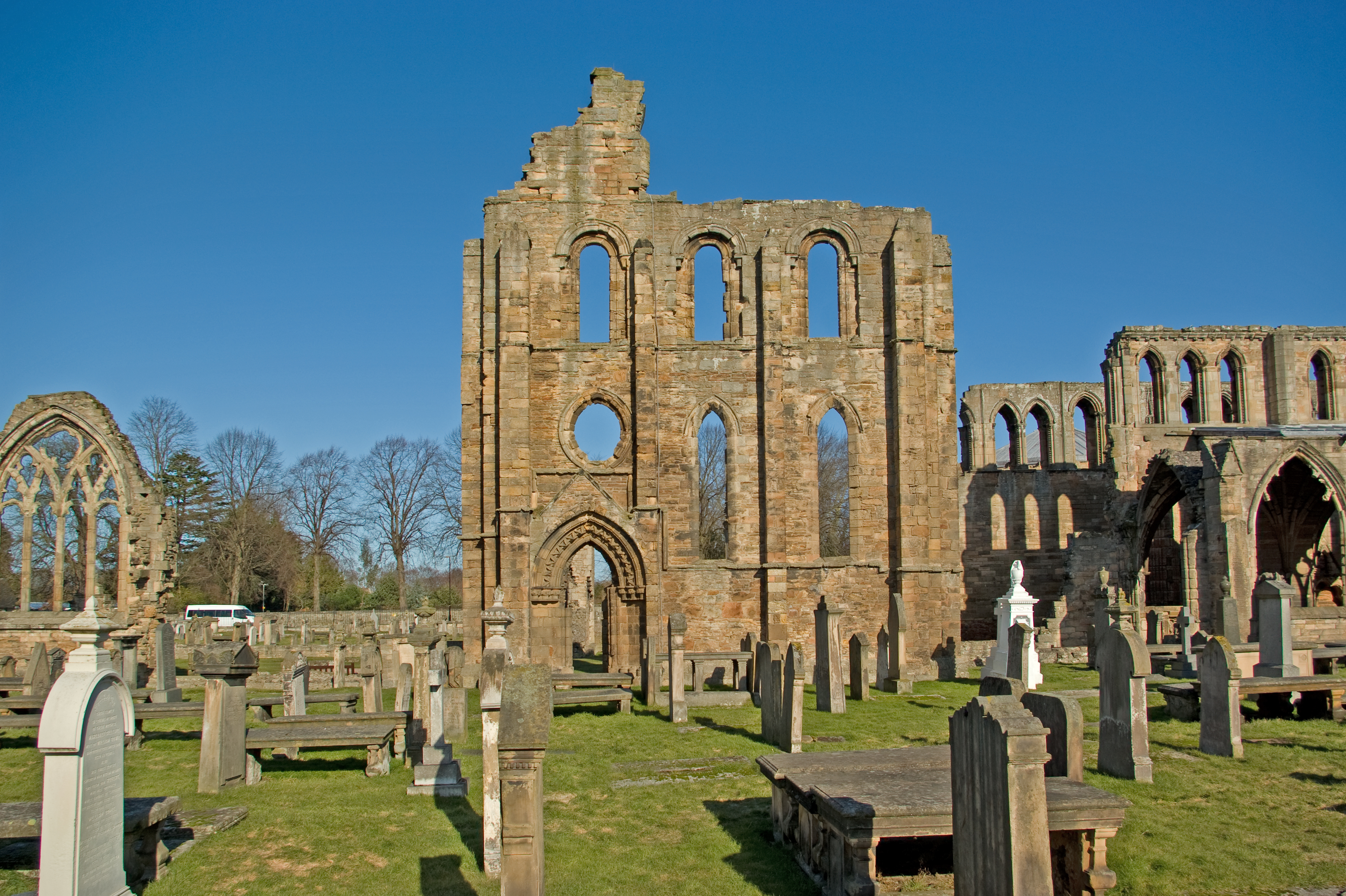
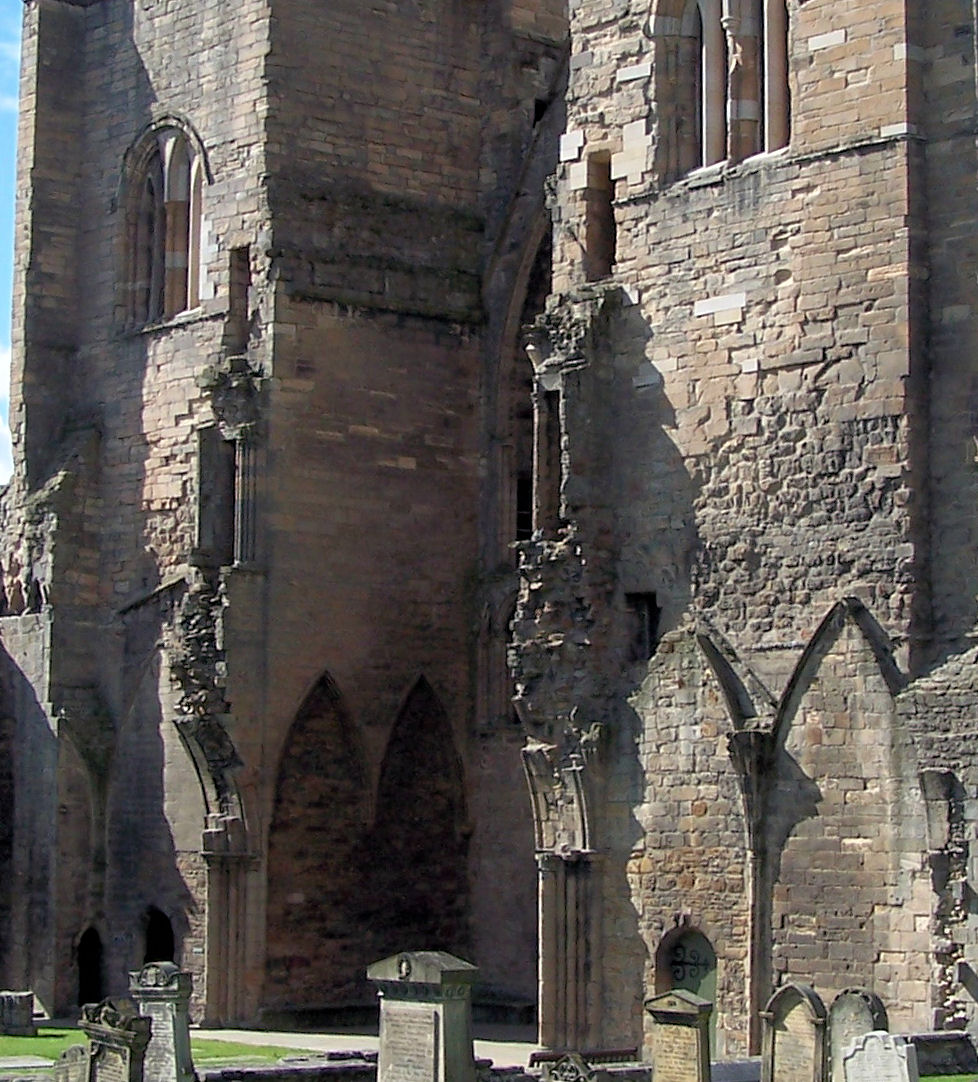
Fig. 4	Fig. 5	Fig. 6	Fig. 7
The 1224 establishment and then the enlargement after 1270	North wall of choir showing traces of blocked-in windows	The south wall of the southern transept	Integrated tower and nave construction

Building 1270 – Reformation
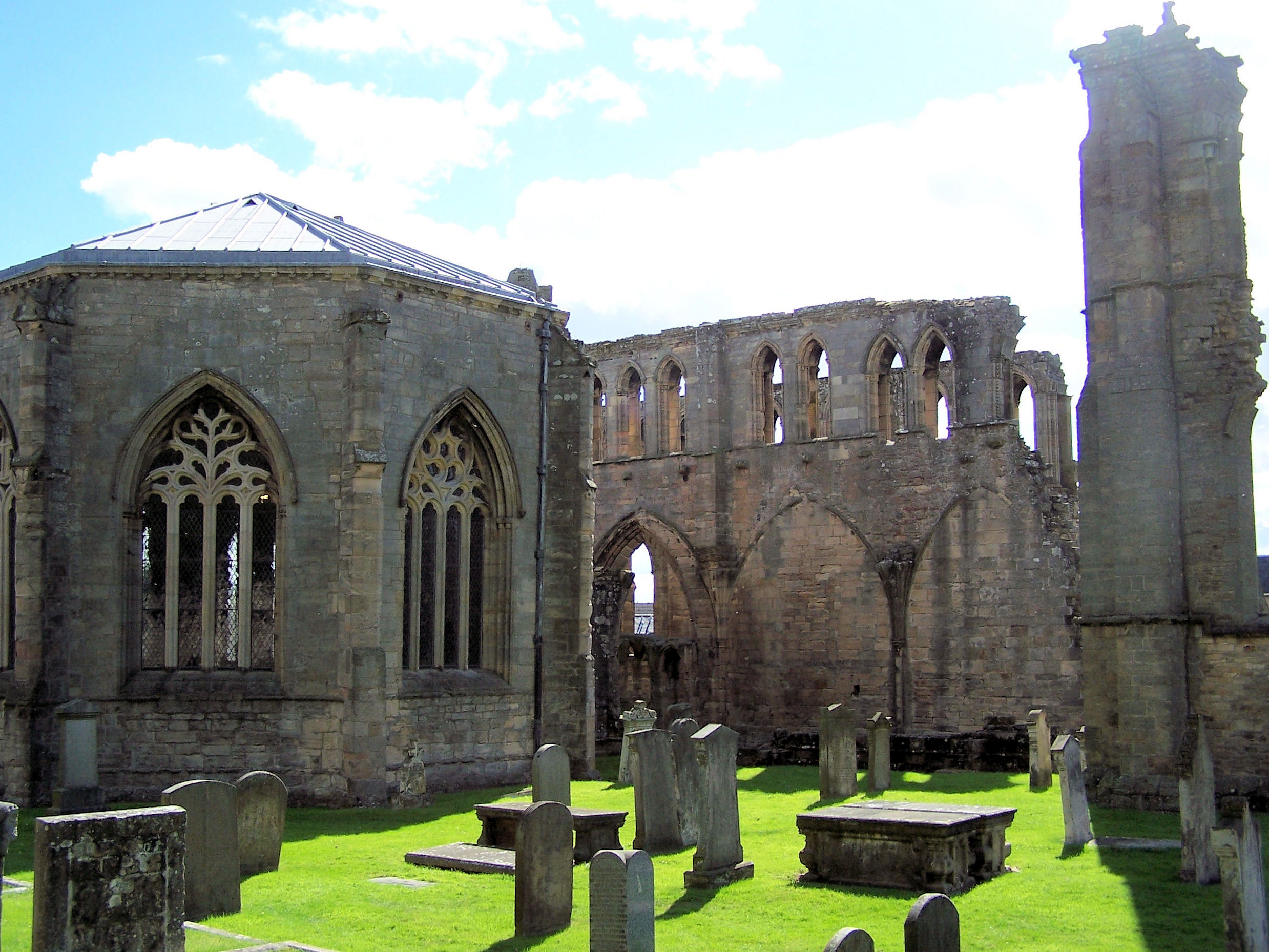
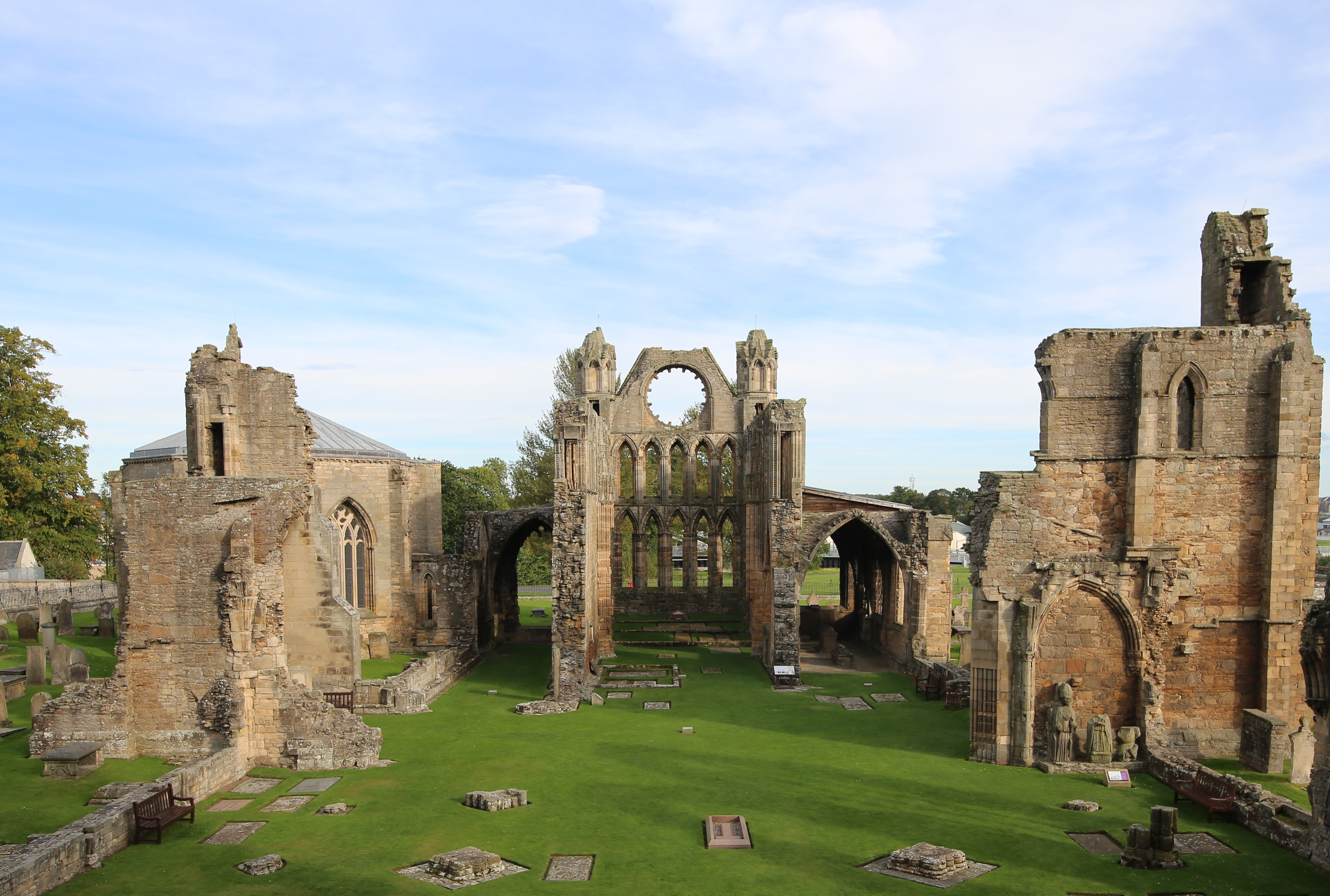
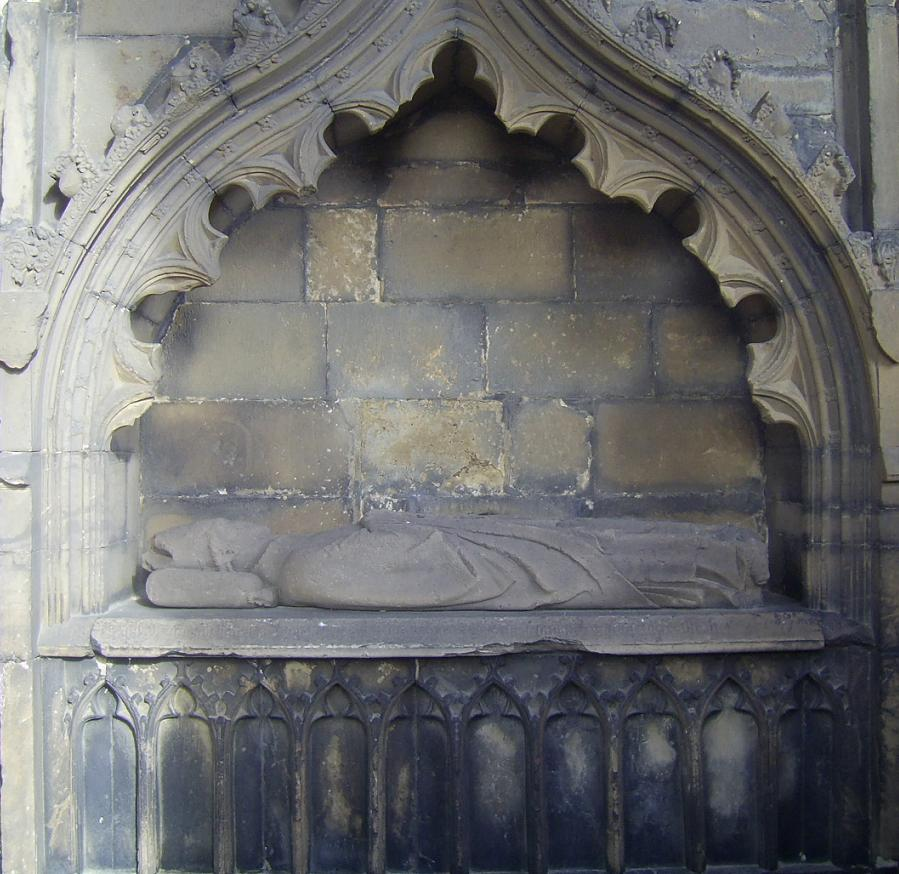
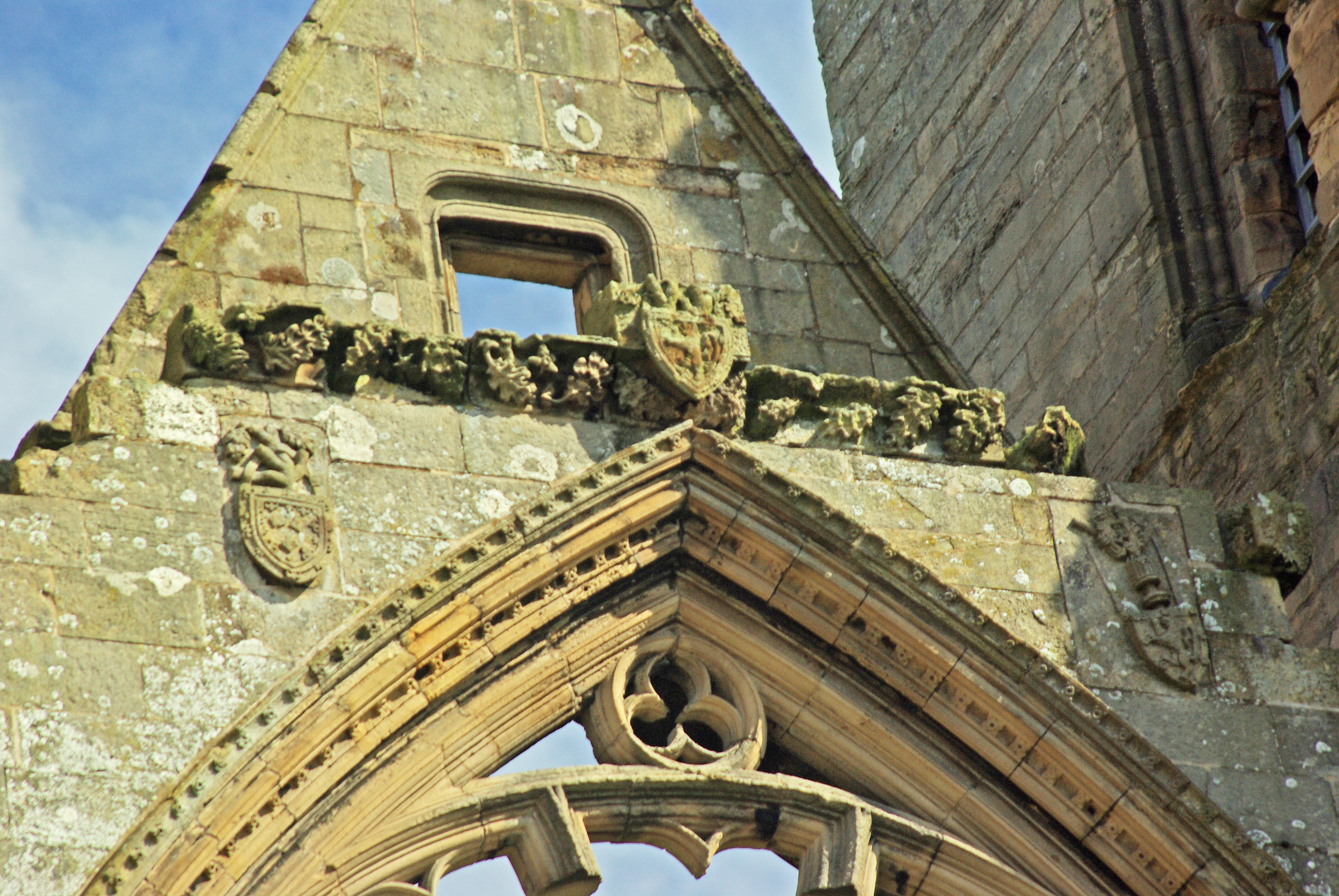
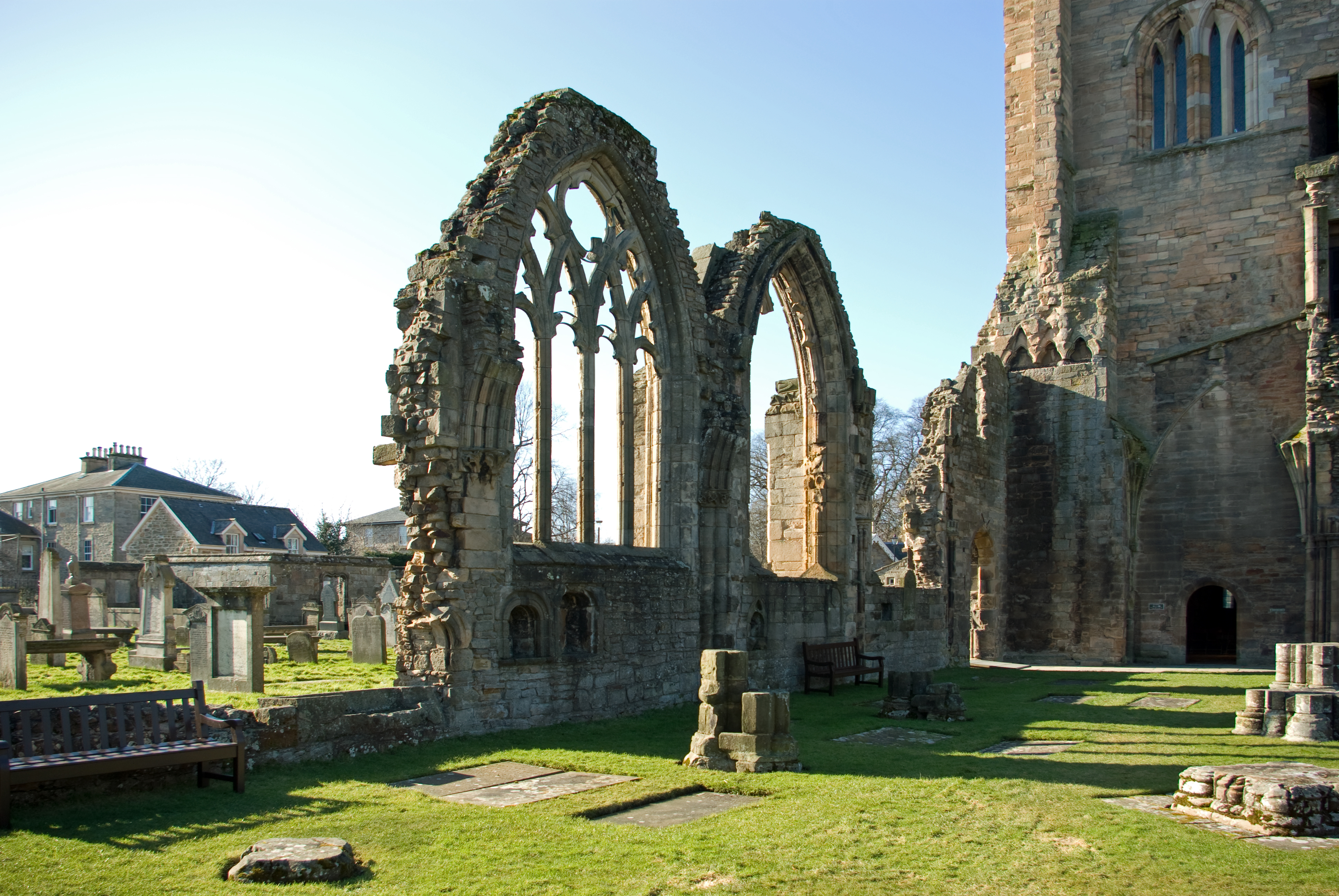
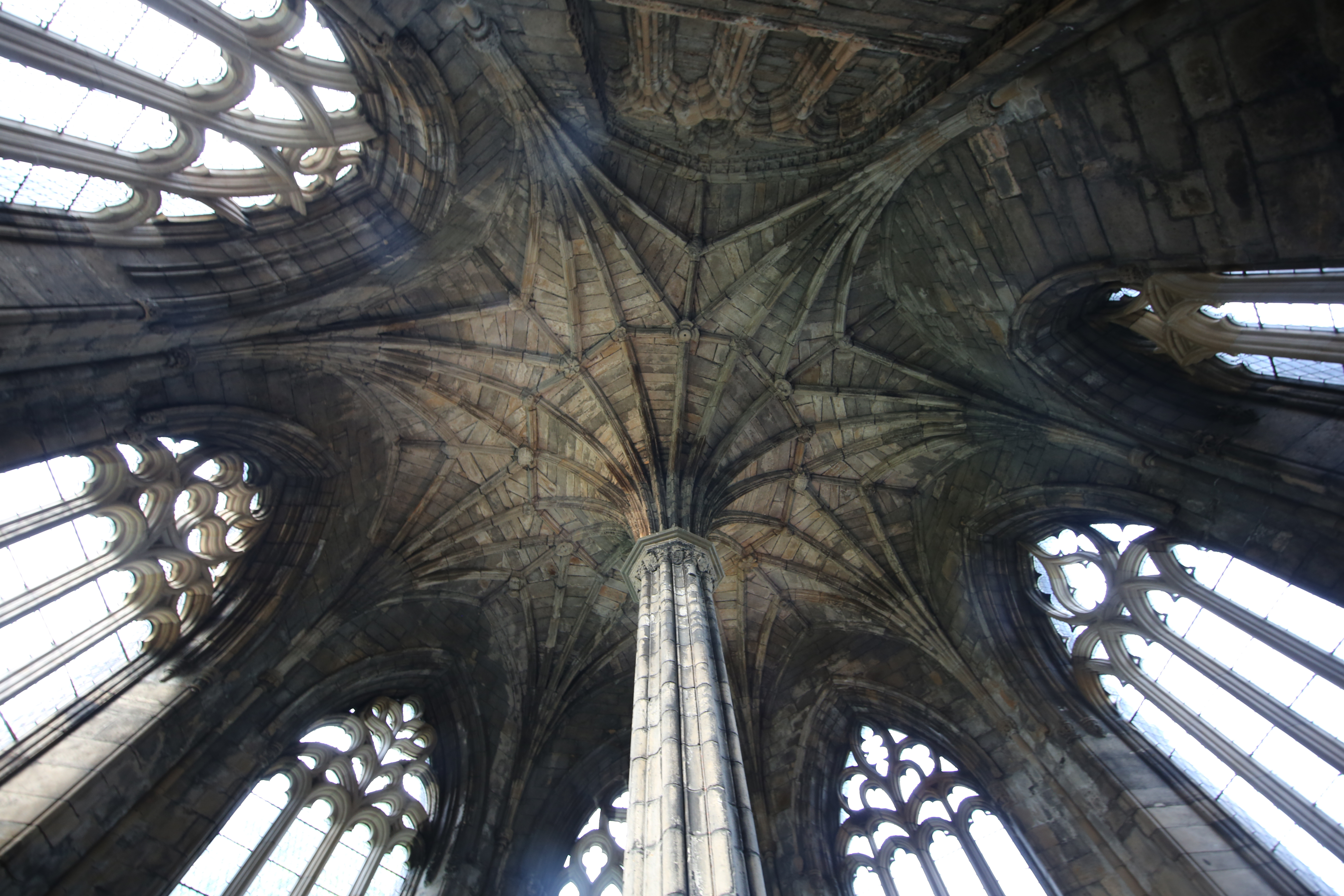
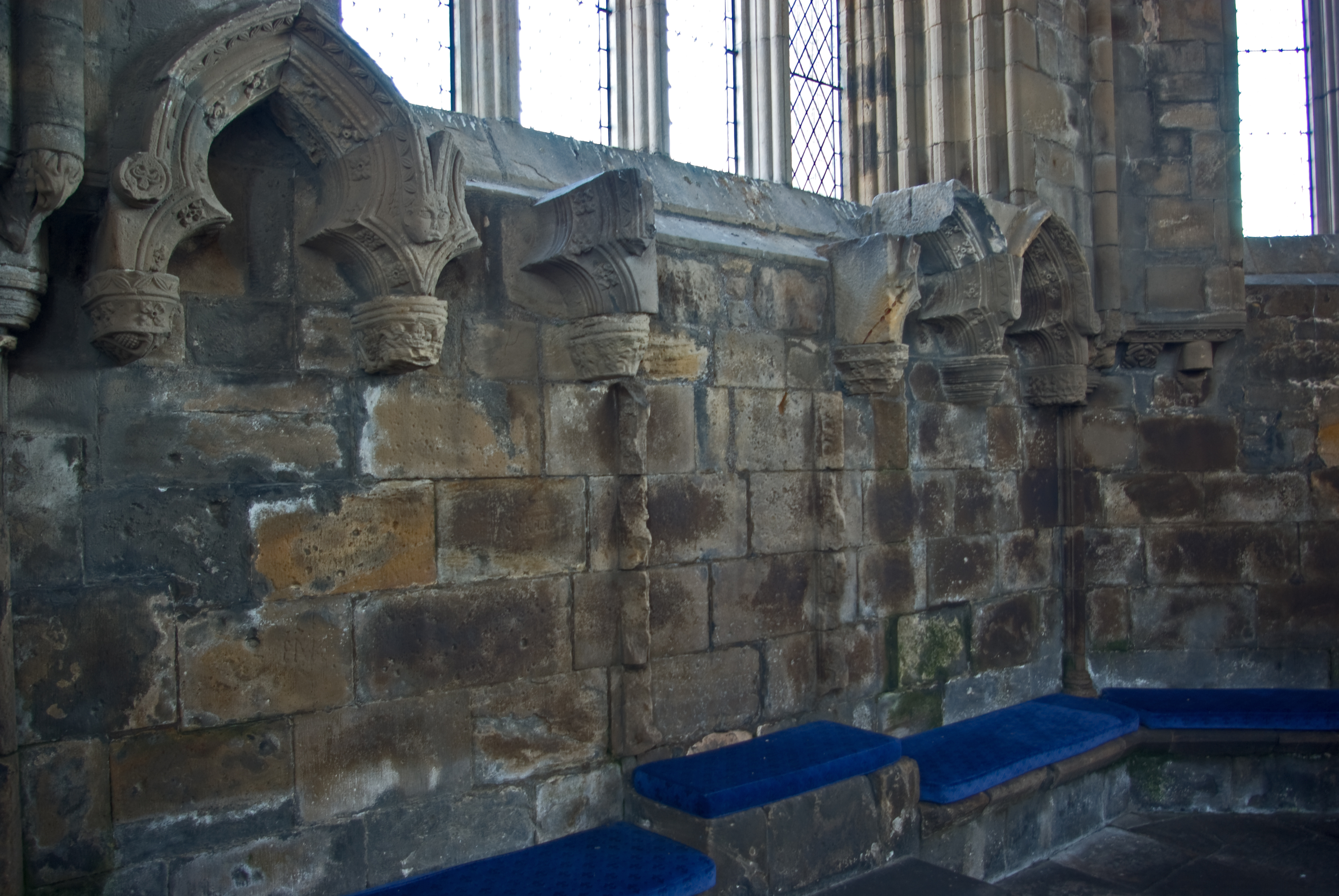
Fig. 8	Fig. 9	Fig. 10	Fig. 11	Fig. 12	Fig. 13	Fig. 14
The octagonal chapter house on the left, and behind it indications of the now missing north choir aisle	The nave in the foreground, the transepts in the middle ground and the choir and choir aisles in the rear ground	Tomb and effigy of Bishop John Winchester (1435–1460) in the south aisle of the choir	West gable apex and arms of Bishopric of Moray (left), Royal arms of Scotland (centre) and Bishop Columba de Dunbar (right)	The 15th century replacement windows in the 13th century openings	Interior of the chapter house showing the central column supporting the vaulted ceiling	The bench reserved for the dean and dignitaries within the chapter house

19th and 20th century stabilisation
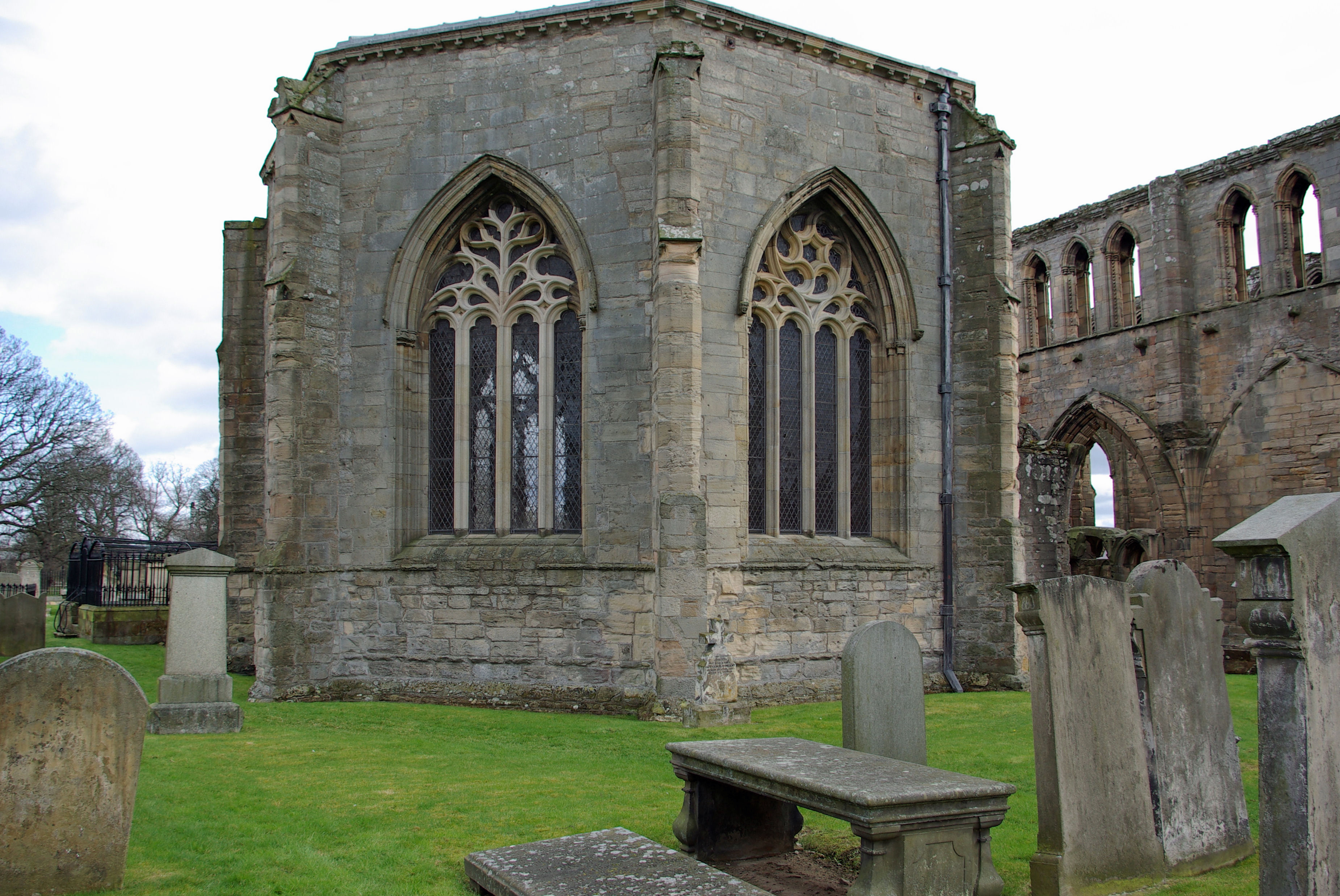
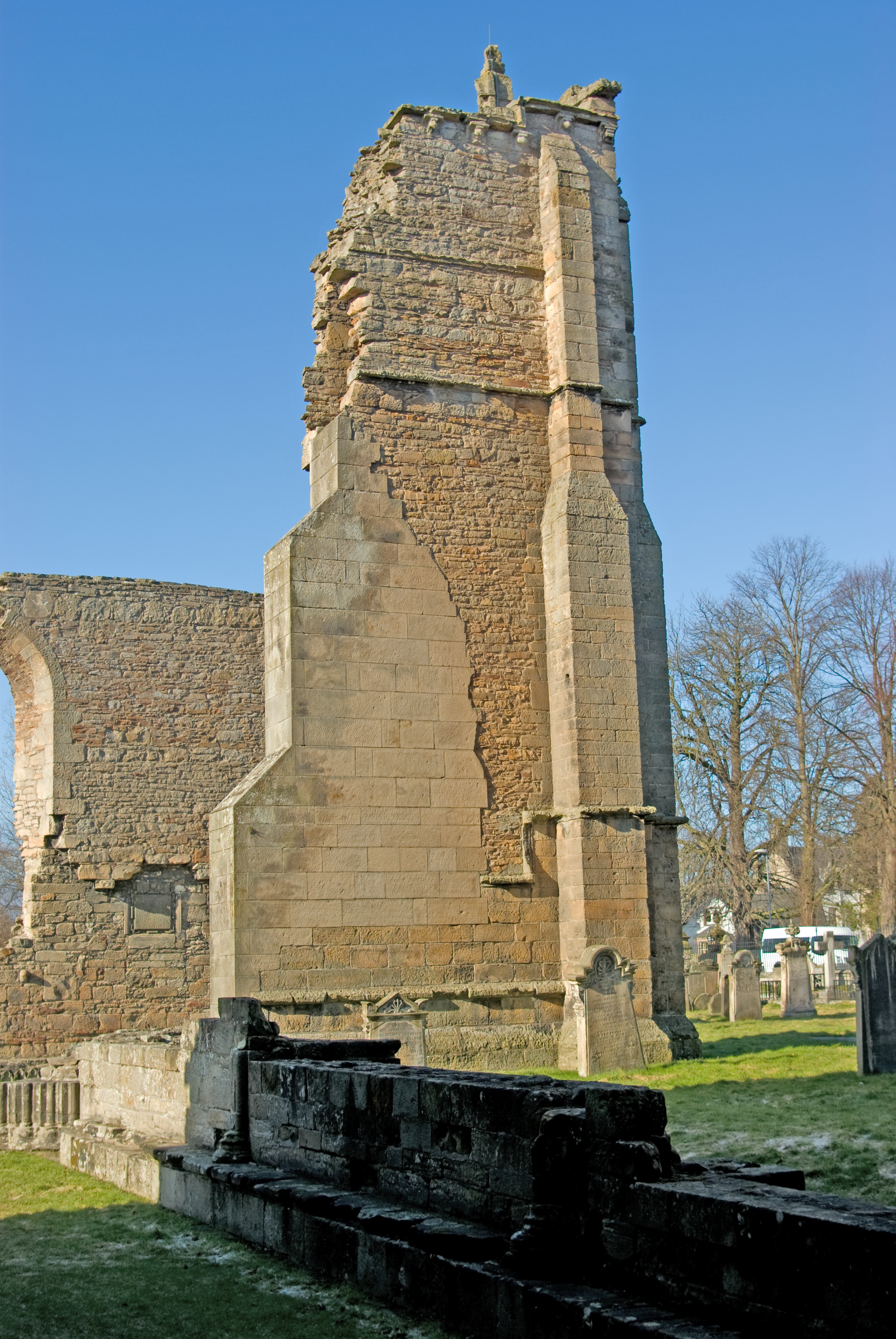
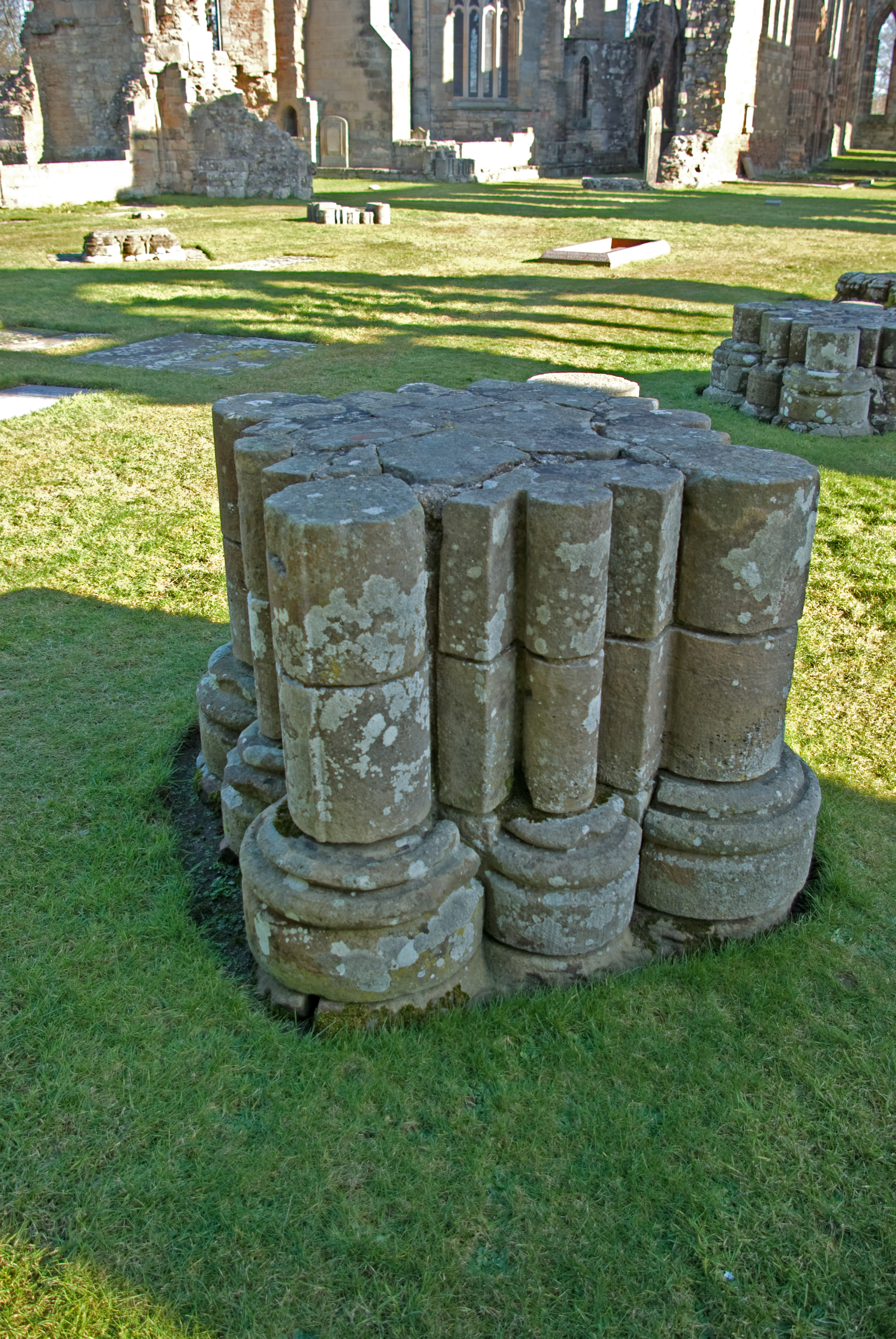
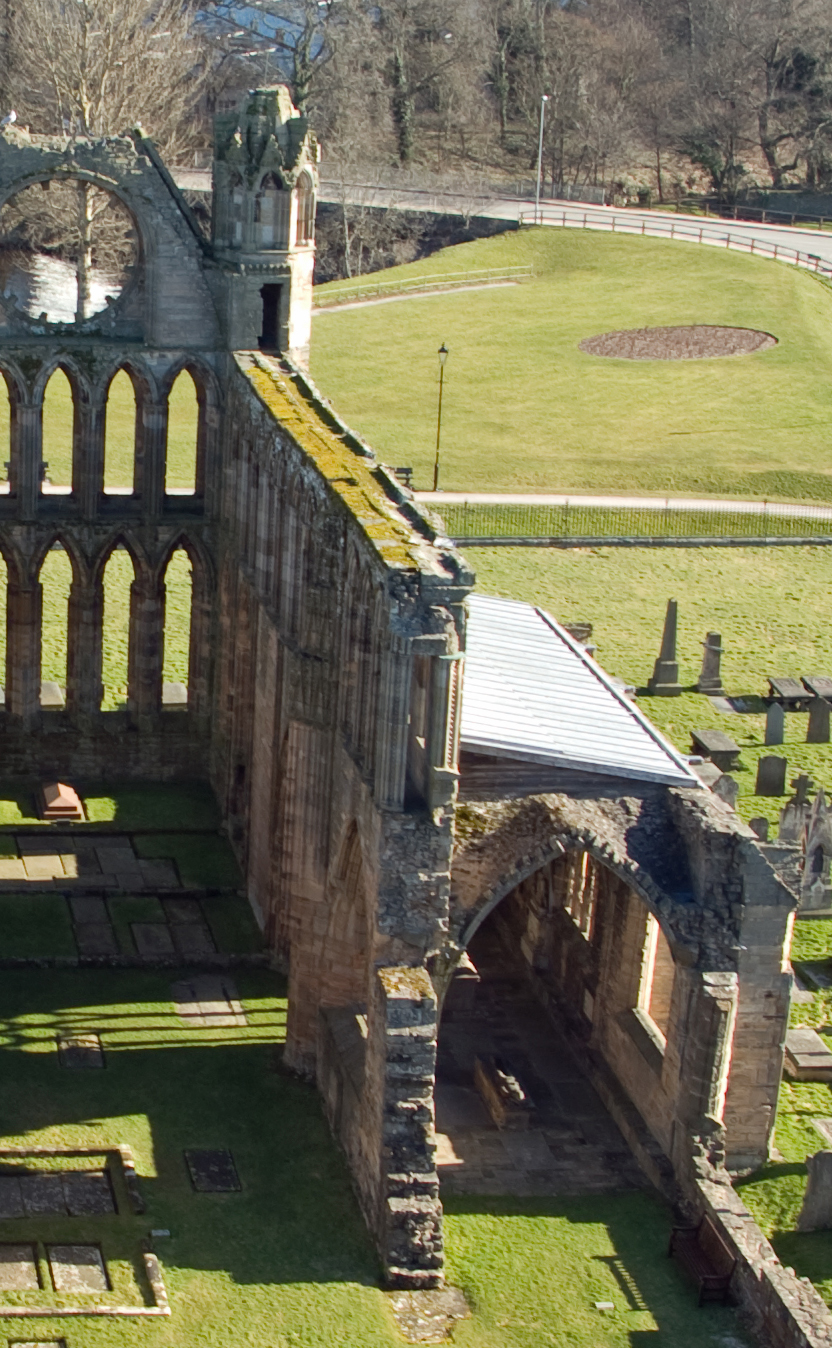
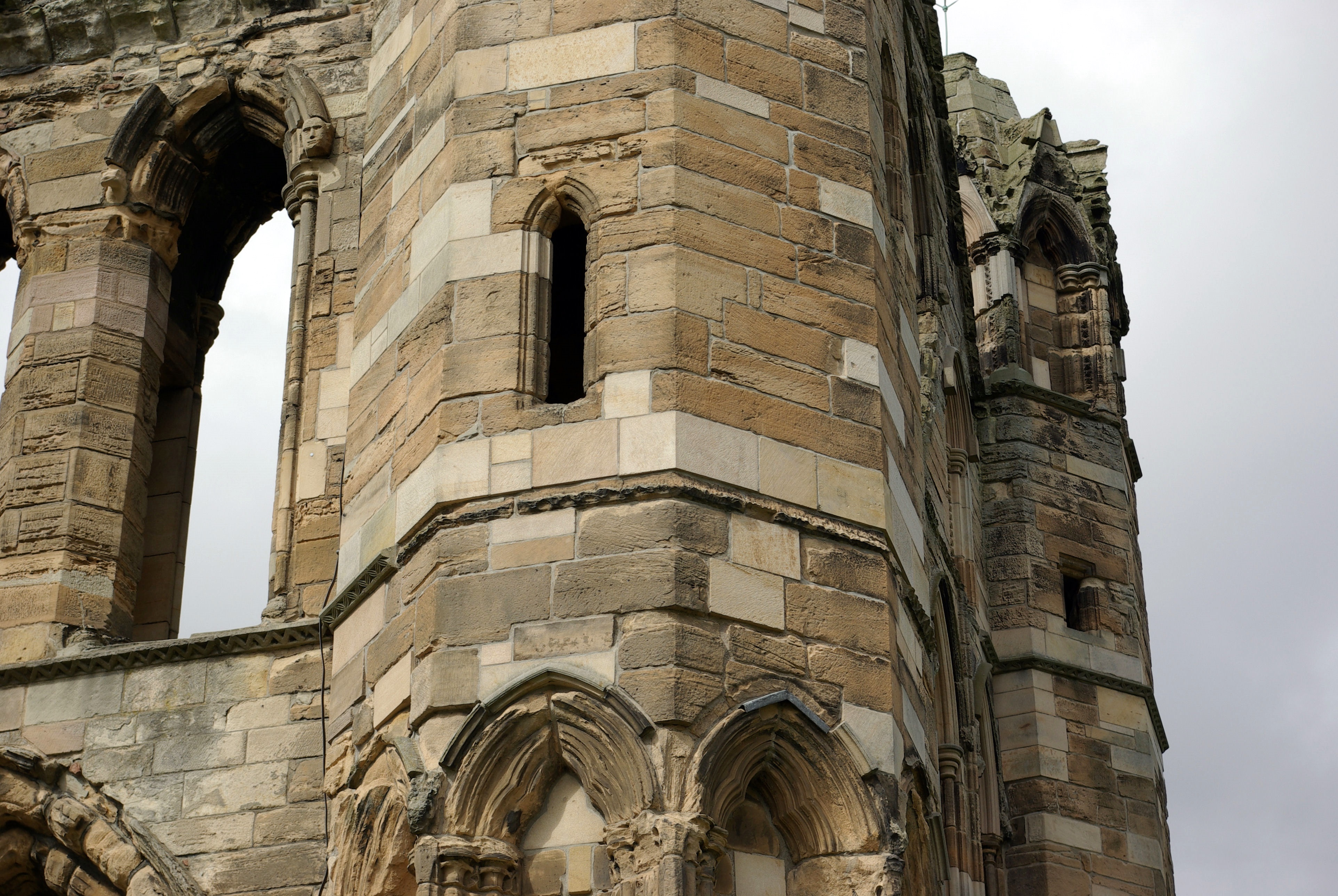
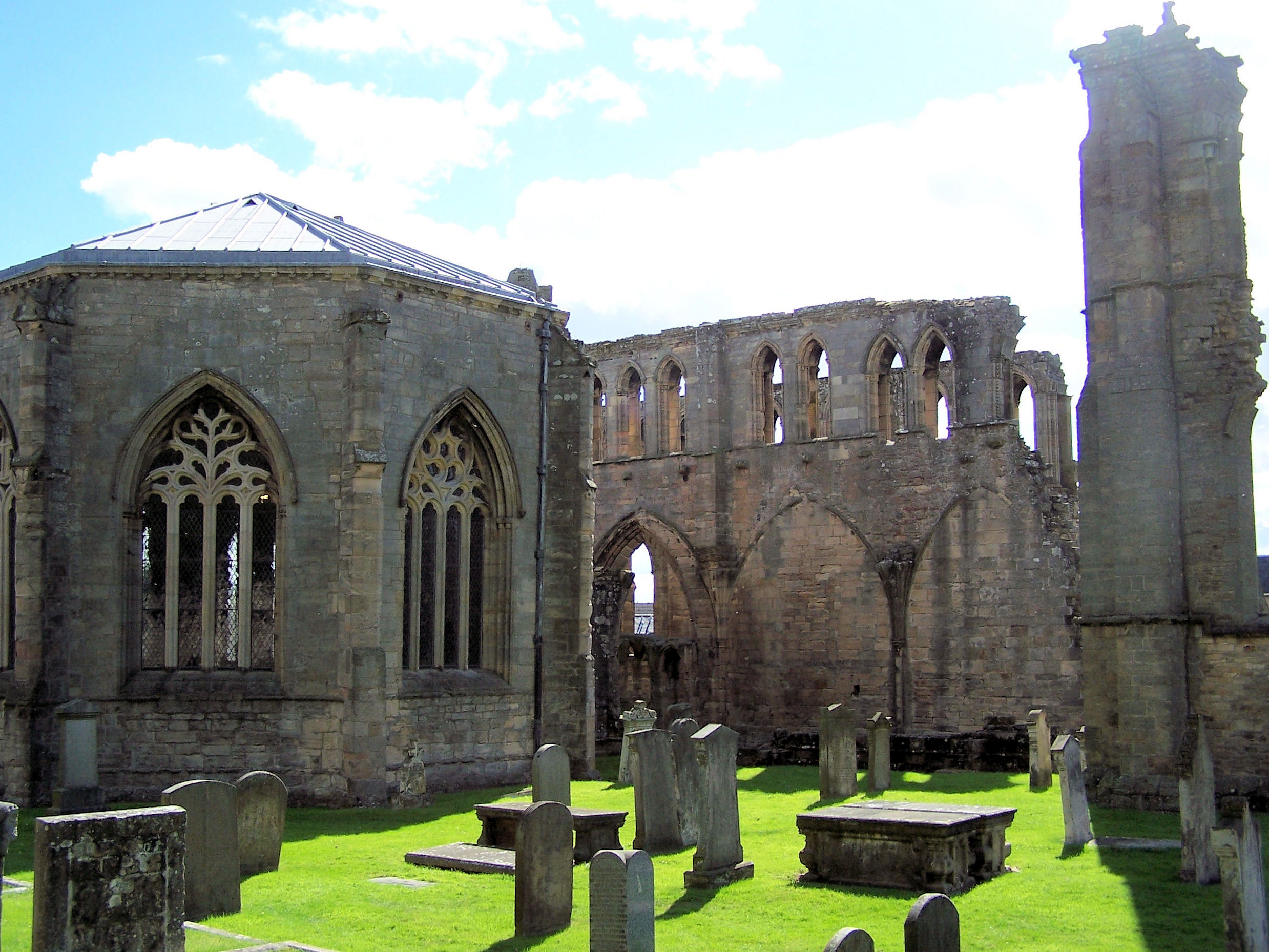
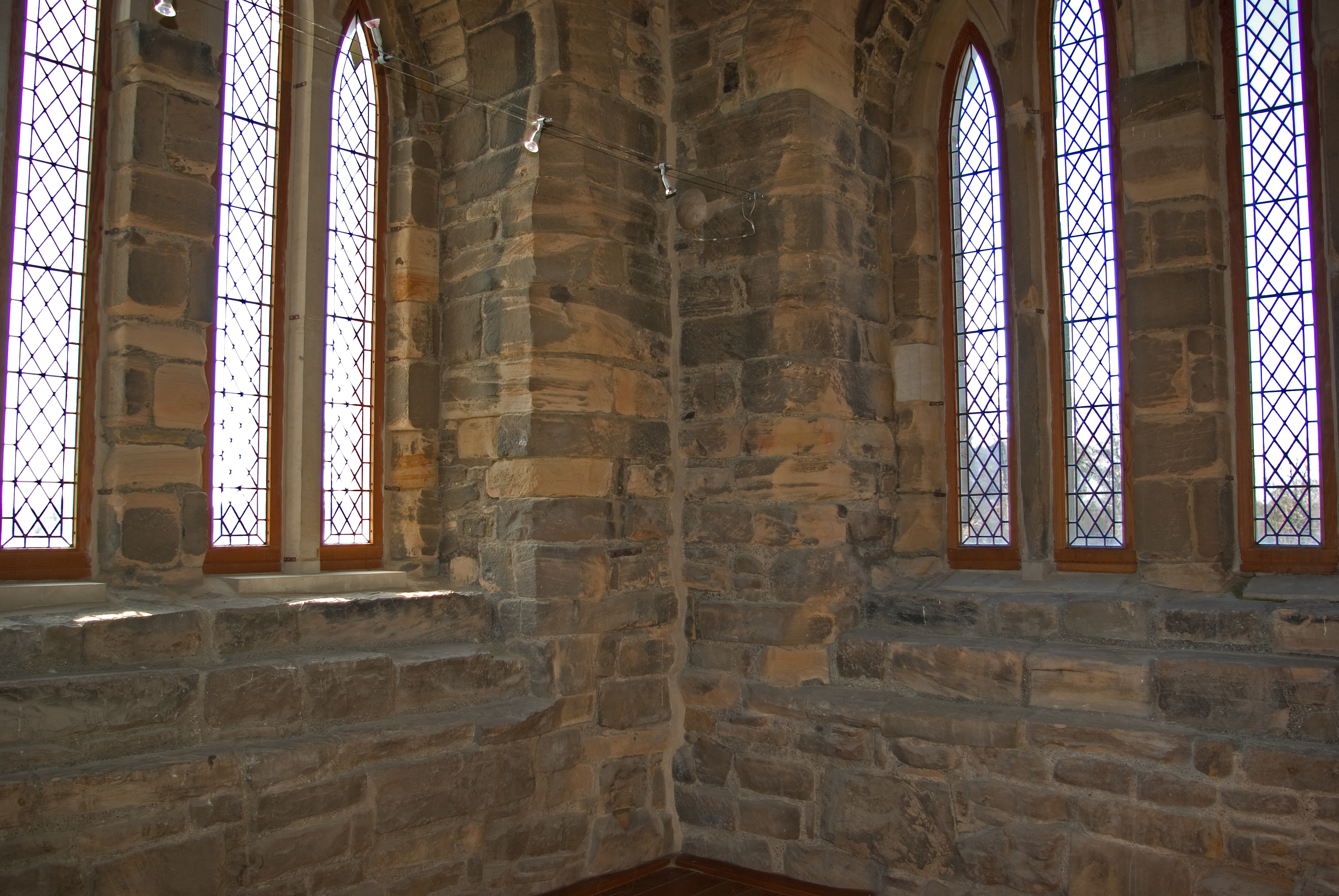
Fig. 15	Fig. 16	Fig. 17	Fig. 18	Fig. 19	Fig. 20	Fig. 21
The replacement of the missing form pieces, mullions, and decorative ribs in the window in the north-east wall of the chapter house	Partial dismantlement of some 19th-century buttressing in the 1930s	The rebuilt sections of the nave piers using recovered pieces	External roofing of the vault in the south choir in 1939	During the last forty years of the 20th century crumbling stonework was restored	Between 1976 and 1988, the chapter house window tracery was gradually replaced and its protective re-roofing completed	Floors, glazing, and new roofs were added to the west towers between 1988 and 2000

== Sources ==
BOOKS

- Barrow, G. W. S. (1989). Kingship and Unity. Edinburgh: Edinburgh University Press. ISBN 978-0-7486-0104-2.
- Boardman, Stephen I. (1996). The Early Stewart Kings: Robert II and Robert III, 1371–1406. John Donald. ISBN 978-1-904607-68-7.
- Brown, Peter Hume (1970). Early Travellers in Scotland. B. Franklin. ISBN 978-1-84567-744-2.
- Butler, Dugald (2007). Scottish Cathedrals and Abbeys. BiblioLife. ISBN 978-1-110-89589-2.
- Byatt, Mary (2005). Elgin: A History and Celebration of the Town. New York: Ottakers. ISBN 978-0-8337-0384-2.
- Cant, Ronald Gordon (1974). Historic Elgin and its Cathedral. Elgin: Elgin Society. ISBN 978-0-9504028-0-2.
- Cowan, Ian Borthwick; Easson, David Edward (1976). Medieval Religious Houses, Scotland: With an Appendix on the Houses in the Isle of Man. London: Longman. ISBN 978-0-582-12069-3.
- Cowan, Ian Borthwick; Kirk, James (1995). The Medieval Church in Scotland. Edinburgh: Scottish Academic Press. ISBN 978-0-7073-0732-9.
- Cowan, Ian B. (1967). The Parishes of Medieval Scotland. Scottish Record Society, vol. 93. Edinburgh: Neill & Co.
- Cramond, William (1908). The Records of Elgin. Aberdeen: New Spalding Club.
- Dalyell, John G. (1826). Records of the Bishopric of Moray. Edinburgh.
- Dowden, John (1910). The Medieval Church in Scotland: Its Constitution, Organisation and Law. Glasgow: J. MacLehose.
- Fawcett, Richard (2001). Elgin Cathedral. Edinburgh: Historic Scotland. ISBN 978-1-903570-24-1.
- Fawcett, Richard (1999). Elgin Cathedral: Official Guide. Edinburgh: Historic Scotland. ISBN 978-1-900168-65-6.
- Fawcett, Richard; Oram, Richard (2014). Elgin Cathedral and the Diocese of Moray. Historic Scotland. ISBN 978-1-84917-173-1.
- Grant, Alexander (1993). The Wolf of Badenoch. Edinburgh: Scottish Society for Northern Studies. ISBN 978-0-9505994-7-2.
- Johnson, Samuel (1996). A Journey to the Western Isles of Scotland. Edinburgh. ISBN 978-1-85715-253-1.
- Innes, Cosmo (1837). Registrum Episcopatus Moraviensis (1 ed.). Edinburgh: The Ballantyne Club.
- Keith, Robert (1824). An Historical Catalogue of the Scottish Bishops, Down to the Year 1688. Edinburgh: Bell & Bradfute.
- Lawrie, Archibald C. (1905). Early Scottish Charters Prior to A.D. 1153. Glasgow: J. MacLehose and Sons.
- Lewis, John; Pringle, Denys (2002). Spynie Palace. Edinburgh: Historic Scotland.
- MacGibbon, David; Ross, Thomas (1896). The Ecclesiastical Architecture of Scotland from the Earliest Christian Times to the Seventeenth Century. Vol. 2. Edinburgh: David Douglas.
- Mackintosh, Herbert B. (1914). Elgin Past and Present. Elgin: J. D. Yeadon.
- McCormack, Finbar (1994). Excavations at Pluscarden Priory, Moray. Vol. 124. Proceedings of the Society of Antiquaries of Scotland.
- Oram, Richard (1996). Moray & Badenoch: A Historical Guide. Edinburgh: Birlinn. ISBN 978-1-874744-46-7.
- Shaw, Lachlan (1882). The History of the Province of Moray. Vol. III (2nd ed.). Glasgow: Hamilton, Adams & Co.
- Taylor, James (1853). Edward I of England in the North of Scotland. Elgin: R. Jeans.
- Watson, William J. (1901). Morayshire Described: Being a Guide to Visitors and a Handbook for Students of the History of the County. Elgin: The Northern Counties Publishing Company.
- Watt, D. E. R. (2003). Fasti Ecclesiae Scoticanae Medii Aevi ad Annum 1638. Edinburgh: Scottish Record Society. ISBN 978-0-902054-19-6.
- Young, Robert (1879). Annals of the Parish and Burgh of Elgin. Elgin.

JOURNALS

- Firth, David (2022). "A New Map of the Chanonry of the Cathedral Church of the Holy and Undivided Trinity at Elgin". The Innes Review. 73 (1). doi:10.3366/inr.2022.0323. S2CID 248851359.
- Haws, Charles H. (1982). "Continuity and Change: The Clergy of the Diocese of Moray, 1560–74". Northern Scotland. 5 (1): 91–98. doi:10.3366/nor.1982.0016.
- MacDonald, W. Rae (1899). "Notes on the Heraldry of Elgin and its Surrounding District". Proceedings of the Society of Antiquaries of Scotland. 34: 344–429.

WEB

- Fanning, William (1908). "Chapter". The Catholic Encyclopedia. New York: Robert Appleton Company.
- "Investigating Elgin Cathedral". Historic Environment Scotland. Archived from the original on 6 August 2017.
- Hall, Derek W.; MacDonald, A. D. S.; Perry, D. R.; Terry, J. (1998). "The Archaeology of Elgin: Excavations on Ladyhill and in the High Street, with an Overview of the Archaeology of the Burgh". Proceedings of the Society of Antiquaries of Scotland. 128: 753–829. doi:10.9750/PSAS.128.753.829.
- "John Shanks". Inverness Courier extract. Electric Scotland.
- Scottish Medieval Charters Project (2007). "Lost Episcopal Acta" (PDF). Scottish Medieval Charters. University of Glasgow.
- "Records of the Parliament of Scotland to 1707". University of St Andrews.
