= Dean of Moray =

The Dean of Moray was the head of the cathedral chapter of the diocese of Moray, north-central Scotland, based at Elgin Cathedral. The diocese of Moray is first known to have had a dean from a document dating between 1207 and 1208, and its first dean known by name from a document dating between 1207 and 1211. The position remained in existence until the 17th century.

== List of deans of Moray ==
The following is a list of known deans of Moray:

DEAN	TENURE	EPISCOPATE	NOTES
Freskin	× 1207 × 1211-1226×1230	Bricius de Douglas, Andreas de Moravia	Probably surnamed de Douglas. He is attested as dean in two documents, one dated 1207 × 1211, and one 19 June 1226.
Hugh	1226×1230-1230	Andreas de Moravia	Probably surnamed de Douglas. He is attested as dean in one document, dated between 19 June 1226 (see above) and 4 September 1230 (see below).
Simon de Gunby	1230×1232-1244	Andreas de Moravia	Surname de Gunby is probable, not certain. He is attested as dean in two documents, dated 4 September 1230 and 26 July 1232. He became Bishop of Moray in 1244.
Archibald	1244×1249-1253	Simon de Gunby	Surname unknown. His identification with the later bishop is very probable, though not certain. He is attested as dean in two documents, dated 4 February and 20 March 1249. Bishop Archibald was consecrated as bishop in 1253.
Nicholas de Hedon	1253-1254 × 1260	Archibald	Nicholas was provided to the deanery by Pope Innocent IV. Thereafter he litigated with the locally elected dean, Andrew de Dunn, and emerged as successful on 19 December 1253. He was confirmed by Pope Innocent IV on 7 January 1254 and then reconfirmed by Pope Alexander IV a year or so later.
Andrew de Dunn	1253	Archibald	Elected locally, but lost out at papal curia to Nicholas de Hedon by end of the year. See above.
William de Dunn	1254 × 1260-1275 × 1296	Archibald	First attested as Dean on 11 April 1260. Attested again as Dean on 10 January 1275. Next known dean is first attested on 28 August 1296.
Walter Herok	1275 × 1296-1329	Archibald, David de Moravia, John de Pilmuir	First attested as Dean on 28 August 1296. He was still in possession of deanery on 15 March 1329, but died later in the year at the papal curia while pursuing his election as Bishop of Aberdeen.
Andrew de Hirdmaniston	1329-1333 × 1349	John de Pilmuir	The pope provided him as Dean on 19 September 1329, following Herok. He was attested again on 10 May 1333 but not thereafter.
John Paniter	1333 ×1345-1345 × 1349	John de Pilmuir	He is not attested during his own lifetime, but is mentioned as the last and recently deceased Dean when sometime before 8 November 1349, but after 25 January 1345, his successor was confirmed in possession by the Pope.
William de Pilmuir	1345 × 1349-1358 × 1368	John de Pilmuir, Alexander Bur	William became Dean sometime between 25 January 1345 and 8 November 1349. He is attested in possession again on 2 May 1358 but had died sometime before 7 December 1368.
Alexander de Kylwos	1368-1371	Alexander Bur	Kylwos was provided to the deanery on 7 December 1368. He had possession by 19 December 1370. Was provided as Bishop of Ross on 9 May 1371.
Thomas de Harcars	1368	Alexander Bur	According to papal documents, Harcars was provided to the deanery on 11 December 1368, despite the apparent provision of Kylwose four days before. He died sometime before 3 May 1370, apparently without ever having possession of the deanery.
Robert Sinclair	1371-1391	Alexander Bur	He was granted papal provision on 28 May 1371. He was provided as Bishop of Orkney on 27 January 1384 but on 10 February was granted dispensation to retain the deanery along with his Orkney bishopric, of which he never had possession (see Western Schism). This dispensation was revoked on 21 March 1391, after he became Bishop of Dunkeld, a bishopric of which he did gain possession.
Walter Trail	1383	Alexander Bur	Trail got provision to the Moray deanery on 28 November 1383 because Sinclair was expected to resign; that did not occur, for which see above.
John de Douglas	1391-1424 × 1428	Alexander Bur, William de Spynie, John de Innes, Henry de Lichton, Columba de Dunbar	Douglas got papal provision after the revocation of Sinclair's provision on 21 March 1391. He was still in possession of the deanery on 13 April 1424. Date of death is not known, but it occurred before 10 March 1428.
John Derling	1424	Columba de Dunbar	Received provision to deanery on 13 April 1424, but died in the following month. It is unclear why Derling got this provision.
Walter Stewart	1428-1433 × 1434	Columba de Dunbar	Stewart was elected to the deanery following the death of Douglas (1424 × 1428) and had possession by 11 August 1428, when he received papal provision. Stewart still had possession on 26 February 1433 but had died sometime before 9 January 1434.
Thomas Archer	1428-1428 × 1429	Columba de Dunbar	Received papal provision on March 1428, presumably without knowing or in opposition to the election of Stewart. Sometime before May 1429 he had resigned his rights to Stewart in exchange for the position of Treasurer of Dunkeld.
William Turnbull	1434-1435	Columba de Dunbar, John de Winchester	Turnbull received provision in the first half of 1434, after Walter Stewart's death. He litigated with James Stewart, and had lost possession to Stewart by 11 November 1435.
James Stewart	1435-1460	John de Winchester	After litigation with Turnbull, Stewart had won papal provision and possession by 11 November 1435. He held the deanery until he was provided as Bishop of Moray on 19 May 1460.
Andrew Stewart	1460-1482	James Stewart, David Stewart, William de Tulloch	Andrew Stewart was provided to deanery on 19 May 1460, upon James Stewart's elevation to the bishopric.
Gavin Vaiche	1482-1486	Andrew Stewart	After elevation of Andrew Stewart to the bishopric, Vaiche, chaplain of the King, was present to the deanery; he received provision to the deanery on 17 May 1483. He was still in possession on 3 September 1486 but had died before 26 December.
James Chisholm	1482-1487	Andrew Stewart	Chisholm claimed to have had papal provision to deanery after elevation to bishopric of Andrew Stewart. Does not seem to have ever had possession. He resigned his right on 1 March 1487 but got new provision on 27 March, despite being provided as Bishop of Dunblane in the previous January.
William Turnbull	1484-1487	Andrew Stewart	Turnbull received papal provision in sometime after 14 August 1484 but resigned his rights on 18 September.
Gavin Dunbar senior	1484/6-1518	Andrew Stewart, Andrew Forman; James Hepburn	Dunbar had some rights to the deanery in 1484, which he resigned in the same year. After the death of Vaiche in 1486, he was elected by the chapter; in the following year, 1487, he was confirmed by both the Bishop of Moray and the Pope. He resigned the running of the deanery to Gavin Dunbar junior in 1517, but retained the rights to the fruits of the benefice. He resigned these to Gavin Dunbar junior after being provided as Bishop of Aberdeen on 5 November 1518.
James Lindsay	1486-1488	Andrew Stewart	Lindsay was provided by the Pope to deanery after Vaiche's death, perhaps in ignorance of the election of Dunbar. He resigned his rights to Dunbar on 28 March 1488, without ever having obtained possession.
John Spens	1487-1488	Andrew Stewart	Spens got provision on 26 April 1486. On 23 August 1487 he agreed to accept a pension from Dunbar, and on this was formally approved by Rome on 29 June 1488. He never obtained possession.
Gavin Dunbar junior	1517-1525	James Hepburn	Dunbar was provided to deanery, without fruits, on 11 September 1517; in the following year the Dean Gavin Dunbar senior resigned these fruits after becoming Bishop of Aberdeen. Dunbar was consecrated as Archbishop of Glasgow on 5 February 1525.
Alexander Dunbar senior	1525-1548/9	Robert Shaw, Alexander Stewart, Patrick Hepburn	First occurs as Dean on 26 March 1525. The deanery was resigned to David Dunbar in 1548, though David was denied the fruits of the office. Alexander Dunbar however was dead by 18 December 1549.
David Dunbar	1548/9-1557	Patrick Hepburn	He was granted provision without fruits on 12 January 1548. Presumably he gained these in the following year when Alexander Dunbar died. David Dunbar died a short time before 28 February 1557.
Alexander Campbell senior	1557-1563	Patrick Hepburn	He received crown presentation to the deanery following David Dunbar's death in 1557. He was instituted as dean in March 1557. He appears to have agreed to renounce his rights in favour of Alexander Dunbar (see below) on 2 February 1560 in exchange for five year tack of the fruits, but Campbell was styled being styled "Dean" (and Dunbar "Succentor") until 1563, when his nephew John Campbell took over.
John Campbell	1563-1566	Patrick Hepburn	He was provost of Kilmun when he succeeded his uncle John. He received crown presentation on 29 April 1563, and then again on 6 July 1564. He resigned his rights to the deanery to Alexander Dunbar on 25 July 1566, in return for a pension, though sources still (accurately or not) style him as such in 1568.
Alexander Dunbar junior	1557/65/66-1590/3	Patrick Hepburn, George Douglas	The son of David Dunbar, and succentor of Moray upon father's death, he was claiming right of succession by right of papal provision. He received crown presentation and permission to seek confirmation from Rome on 30 September 1559 but this did not work out because of the Scottish Reformation. He was still only succentor on 10 December 1565, when the crown recognised his superior right over Campbell, and although he was instituted as Dean on 24 December, it was not until 27 June 1566 that he is first styled "Dean". He resigned on or shortly before 21 June 1590, in order to pave the way for his son Thomas Dunbar, but retained the fruits of the benefice until his death in 1593.
Thomas Dunbar	1590-1620	George Douglas; None (1589-1602); Alexander Douglas	On 24 June 1590 he received crown presentation to the deanery, following the resignation of Alexander Dunbar. He became Presbyter of Forres on 4 March 1591. He was minister of Nairn in 1590, becoming minister of Auldearn from 1591. He died in possession in December 1620.
John Brodie	1621-1655	Alexander Douglas, John Guthrie	Brodie was presented to the benefice by Alexander Lindsay, Lord Spynie; on 31 January 1622, Brodie obtained a decree forcing his parishioners to pay him the fruits of the benefice for the year 1621. He occurs as "Dean" on 23 January 1623 but styled "Minister of Auldearn" thereafter although styled occasionally referred to as "the dean". He died, still in possession of the benefice, on 7 January 1655.
