= John Winchester =

John Winchester may refer to:

- John de Winchester (died 1460), bishop of Moray
- John Winchester (Supernatural), television character
