= Thomas Tulloch =

Thomas Tulloch may refer to:

- Thomas Tulloch (bishop of Ross) (died 1460/1461), Scottish prelate
- Thomas Tulloch (bishop of Orkney) (died after 1461), Scottish prelate
