= James Stewart (bishop) =

Scottish prelate

- Bishop of Moray
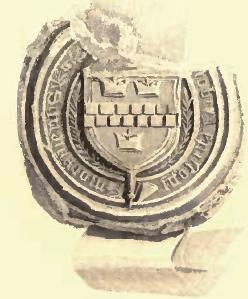
- Church: Roman Catholic Church
- See: Diocese of Moray
- In office: 1460–1462
- Predecessor: John de Winchester
- Successor: David Stewart
- Previous post: Dean of Moray

Orders
- Consecration: 1460

Personal details
- Born: Early 15th century Probably Lorne, Argyll and Bute
- Died: 1466 Moray

James Stewart (Scottish Gaelic: Seumas Stiùbhart) (died 1466) was a prelate from 15th century Scotland. Stewart was a member of the Stewart kindred of Lorne. He was Dean of Moray from 1435 until 19 May 1460, when he was provided to the bishopric. He was consecrated as Bishop of Moray sometime towards the end of the year. He resigned the see two years later in the papal curia in favour of his brother, David Stewart. He died on 5 August 1466.

Religious titles
| Preceded by William Turnbull | Dean of Moray; 1460–1462 | Succeeded by Andrew Stewart |
| Preceded by John de Winchester | Bishop of Moray; 1460–1462 | Succeeded by David Stewart |
