= Columba de Dunbar =

- Bishop of Moray
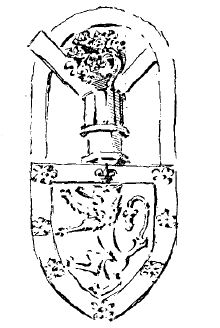
- Archdiocese: →
- See: Diocese of Moray
- In office: 1422–1435
- Predecessor: Henry de Lichton
- Successor: John de Winchester
- Previous post(s): Archdeacon of Lothian (1419–1422)

Orders
- Ordination: Unknown
- Consecration: Unknown

Personal details
- Born: c.1386
- Died: November 1435; Spynie Palace

Columba de Dunbar (c. 1386 – 1435) was Bishop of Moray from 1422 until his death at Spynie Palace near Elgin sometime before 7 November 1435.

Columba was "of Royal race", the third "lawful son of George de Dunbar, 10th Earl of March" and his spouse Christian née Seton.

His father, who supported the so-called English Party in Scotland, later changed his allegiance and went over to King Henry IV of England. Along with his elder brothers, Columba moved to England in 1400. On 28 June 1401 Columba collected £100 given by King Henry to his father the Earl "for his special favour" and on 3 October 1401 Columba collected a further sum of £25/9s/7d for him. "Cristiana countess of Dunbarre" was also awarded £40/19s/3d "for her charges and expenses coming from the North" &c., and Columba collected this at the same time.

On 26 February 1403 (1402/3), while studying at Oxford, "Columba son of George de Dunbarre earl of March of Scotland" was granted "the Deanery of the free chapel of St. Mary Magdalene of Bridgnorth" in Shropshire. This was thought to be a reward for the help provided by his father to King Henry in the battle of Homildon Hill in 1402. More scandalously, in 1410, when a Commission into his activities as Dean was convened, it was found he had stripped lead from the roof of his churches, including that at nearby Quatford, and sold it.

Columba had returned to Scotland, thus evading justice from England, in 1409 and by 1412 he was Dean of Dunbar collegiate church when he witnessed the foundation charter of St Andrews University. In addition, he was the Deacon of the chapel of Ruthven, St. Andrews. On 1 May 1419, by Papal Dispensation, he was given the additional rectory of the parish church of Locherworth or Borthwick (£30 per annum), from which he was promoted to the post of Archdeacon of Lothian. He Supplicated the Pope to be able to retain his former combined annual incomes which were in excess of £100 in addition to £120 for the Archdeaconry. Not only were these allowed but he continued to petition for other positions to be "annexed" to his Archdeaconry for further large sums. His request to retain the Deanery of Dunbar for another year, in April 1422, was contested.

His appointment as Archdeacon was contested by another priest, Edward de Lawedre, who believed the appointment had been promised to him. The litigation continued until Columba's promotion to the See of Moray.

Columba became Bishop of Moray on 3 April 1422 but no record of his consecration exists although it must have taken place between 12 February 1423 and 10 October when he witnesses a charter officially as bishop of Moray. On 1 December 1433, a Safe-conduct was issued by the young King Henry VI for Columba and his entourage of 30 servants "to pass through England on his way to the Roman Court" (Keith says as envoy of King James I of Scotland).

He died before November 1435 and is thought, according to Keith, to have been buried in the aisle of St Thomas the Martyr (Becket) in Elgin Cathedral.

== Notes ==
Religious titles
Preceded by Henry de Lichton	Bishop of Moray; 1422–1435	Succeeded by John de Winchester
