= Thomas Tulloch (bishop of Orkney) =

Thomas de Tulloch was a 15th-century Scottish prelate. A native of Angus, of the Tullochs of Bonington near Forfar, he was presbyter of the diocese of Brechin until on 19 August 1418, he was provided as Bishop of Orkney by Pope Martin V. On 17 June 1420, he tendered his oath of fealty to Eric, King of Norway, in the church of Vestenkov in Laland, and was given a commission by the king to administer Orkney on behalf of the Norwegian crown.

A payment of 50 gold florins was made by Bishop Tulloch at Rome on 23 March 1433. The reason for this payment is not known. He obtained a safe-conduct from King Henry VI of England in November 1441 for himself and eight followers, in order to go from Flanders to Scotland, thence through England to Rome. He resigned his see on or before 11 December 1461 for his cousin William de Tulloch, and died in 1463.

== See also ==
Religious titles
Preceded by William Stephen	Bishop of Orkney; 1418–1461	Succeeded by William Tulloch
