= Andrew Stewart (bishop of Moray) =

Scottish prelate and administrator

- Bishop of Moray
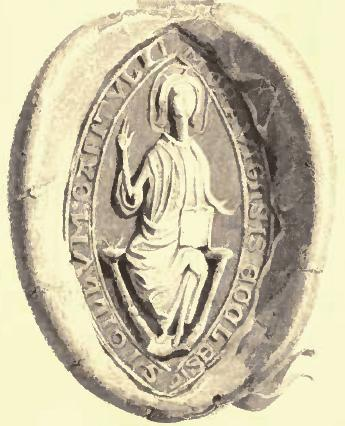
- Church: Roman Catholic Church
- See: Diocese of Moray
- In office: 1482–1501
- Predecessor: William Tulloch
- Successor: Andrew Forman
- Previous post: Dean of Moray

Orders
- Consecration: 1485 x 1487

Personal details
- Born: 1442 x 1445 Scotland
- Died: 29 September 1501 Moray

Andrew Stewart (died 1501) was a 15th-century Scottish prelate and administrator.

== Biography ==
Born between 1442 and 1444, he was the son of Joan Beaufort (d. 1445), widow of King James I of Scotland and former Queen-consort, and her second husband, James Stewart, the Black Knight of Lorne. Being a third son, an ecclesiastical career was a natural course, and as early as 1455 Andrew held the positions of Sub-Dean of the diocese of Glasgow and, briefly, Dean of the diocese of Aberdeen. This was because on 7 May 1455, Pope Calixtus III conferred the deanery of Aberdeen, the Glasgow prebendary of Kirkandris and well as canonry of Lincluden and the vicarage of Kilpatrick, both also in the diocese of Glasgow, after the promotion of Andrew de Durisdeer as Bishop of Glasgow. He was unable to retain the Aberdeen deanery, assumed by Richard Forbes in the following year.

These positions were ideal for funding a university education. Andrew was incorporated at the University of Glasgow in 1456, and he is found as a determinant, i.e. having completed his bachelor's degree, at the University of St Andrews in 1462 x 1463. He appears to have entered the University of Paris ad eundem in 1465. By 1460, he had become Dean of Moray, while retaining the Glasgow sub-deanery. In 1470, he may have been given the position of Provost of the Collegiate church of Lincluden, a position he certainly did hold in 1477.

Andrew's career reached its height when, after the death of Bishop William Tulloch in 1482, he was elected to become the new Bishop of Moray. He received papal provision on 12 August 1482, but was not consecrated until sometime between 22 December 1485 and 24 October 1487. Andrew obtained a papal bull incorporating the provostry of Lincluden into the Moravian episcopal mensa for his lifetime, although this was cancelled in 1488. He was the Keeper of the Privy Seal of Scotland, a position he resigned in early 1483.

For a period he had hopes of becoming Archbishop of St Andrews in the place of William Scheves, but this never transpired. In 1482 he and his two brothers promised 6000 ducats of gold to the city of Edinburgh, "in or the cais of prmocion of the saif reverend fadir [Andrew] to the Archbishoprik of Sanctandrois or quhatsomeuer vther benefice, dignitie, or privilegis". Probably in pursuit of his ambition for St Andrews, he became the most prominent supporter of Alexander Stewart, Duke of Albany, who was attempting to seize the throne of Scotland in this period; this alliance had ended by 1485, when Albany had been defeated, and then killed in a joust in France.

Despite incurring the enmity of King James III of Scotland and the censure of Pope Sixtus IV, Bishop Andrew survived, and was probably reconciled by 1487 when he received consecration. His episcopate is not particularly well documented, but he presided over a general convocation of the canons of Moray late in the year 1487. Andrew is known to have issued a number of episcopal statutes. Among other activities, he was in receipt of a safe-conduct from the English government in May 1497 and was at the Edinburgh parliament of 23 June 1496. King Henry VII of England requested on 5 July 1497 that Bishop Andrew be sent as an emissary to England concerning Perkin Warbeck.

On 13 August 1501 Pope Alexander VI, at the instance of King Louis XII of France, made a reservation of the bishopric of Moray, showing that the Pope believed the see would soon become vacant, and perhaps indicating that Bishop Andrew had contracted some kind of mortal illness. Bishop Andrew did die, on 29 September 1501. He was buried in Elgin Cathedral.

== Ancestry ==
Ancestors of Andrew Stewart (bishop of Moray)

16. Sir James Stewart
8. Sir Robert Stewart
4. Sir John Stewart, Lord of Lorn
2. James Stewart, the Black Knight of Lorn
10. John of Lorn MacDougall
5. Isabel de Ergadia
22. Thomas Isaac
11. Joan Isaac
23. Maud Bruce
1. Andrew Stewart
24. Edward III of England
12. John of Gaunt, 1st Duke of Lancaster
25. Philippa of Hainault
6. John Beaufort, 1st Earl of Somerset
26. Paen de Roet
13. Katherine Roet
3. Joan Beaufort, Queen of Scots
28. Thomas Holland, 2nd Earl of Kent
14. Thomas Holland, 2nd Earl of Kent
29. Joan of Kent
7. Margaret Holland
30. Richard FitzAlan, 10th Earl of Arundel
15. Alice FitzAlan
31. Eleanor of Lancaster

== Notes ==
Political offices
Preceded by William Tulloch; Bishop of Orkney	Keeper of the Privy Seal of Scotland; 1482–1483	Succeeded by David Livingston
Catholic Church titles
Preceded by Andrew de Durisdeer	Sub-Dean of Glasgow; 1455–1482	Succeeded by Archibald Whitelaw
Preceded by Andrew de Durisdeer	Dean of Aberdeen; 1455–1456	Succeeded by Richard Forbes
Preceded by James Stewart	Dean of Moray; 1460–1482	Succeeded by Gavin Vaiche
Preceded by James Crichton	Provost of Lincluden; 1470–1488	Succeeded by David Livingston
Preceded by William Tulloch	Bishop of Moray; 1482–1501	Succeeded by Andrew Forman
