= Gavin Dunbar (archbishop of Glasgow) =

Scottish prelate

- Archbishop of Glasgow
- Church: Roman Catholic Church
- Archdiocese: Glasgow
- Appointed: 8 July 1524
- In office: 1524–1547
- Predecessor: James Beaton
- Successor: Alexander Gordon
- Previous post: Dean of Moray (1517–25) Prior of Whithorn (1518–24)

Orders
- Consecration: 5 February 1525

Personal details
- Born: c. 1490
- Died: 30 April 1547 (aged c. 57)

Gavin Dunbar (c. 1490 – 30 April 1547) was a 16th-century archbishop of Glasgow. He was the third son of John Dunbar of Mochrum and Janet Stewart.

== Biography ==
Gavin Dunbar, his uncle, resigned as Dean of Moray on 5 November 1518 to take up the post of bishop of Aberdeen but managed to secure his former position for his nephew. By 1517 he was preceptor to king James V, and was in charge of the refurbishment of the king's schoolroom in Edinburgh Castle.

In 1518 he was recommended to Pope Leo X by the Duke of Albany for provision to the Priory of Whithorn. This appointment was sought by others and it wasn't until August 1520 that it was confirmed. Dunbar was to hold the positions of Prior of Whithorn and Dean of Moray in commendam.

== Archbishop ==
On 8 July 1524 he was provided to the archbishopric of Glasgow by Pope Clement VII, granting at the same time exemption from the primatial and legatine jurisdiction of the Archbishopric of St Andrews, Primate of All Scotland. Nevertheless, Dunbar's rule would see a good deal of conflict with his fellow archbishop, including in 1543 physical attacks by Dunbar on the person of Cardinal and Archbishop David Beaton. Dunbar was made Chancellor of Scotland on 8 July 1528, a position he held until 1543.

== Persecution of Protestants ==
Dunbar's archiepiscopate coincided with one of the first tides of Protestantism to enter Scotland. Dunbar played a proactive role persecuting the perceived heretics. In 1539 alone he ordered the burning of seven people, including a youth named Alexander Kennedy and a Franciscan friar named Jerome Russell. On 29 February 1528, Dunbar attended the trial and signed the sentence of Patrick Hamilton, who was burned alive for six hours before dying (the faggots were wet), a death which made him one of the Scottish Reformation's most famous martyrs.

== Cursing ==
Dunbar also is known for his "Monition of Cursing" against the Border Reivers of the Anglo-Scottish Border region. George MacDonald Fraser, in his history of the Reivers, The Steel Bonnets, admiringly calls it a "remarkable burst of invective," and says that it places Dunbar "among the great cursers of all time." Priests in all of the parishes of the border lands were required to read out the curse (written in Scots) to their congregations. A short extract gives the flavour:

I curse thair heid and all the haris of thair heid; I curse thair face, thair ene [eyes], thair mouth, thair neise, thair toung, thair teith, thair crag [neck], thair schulderis, thair breist, thair hert, thair stomok, thair bak, thair wame [womb], thair armes, thair leggis, thair handis, thair feit, and everilk part of thair body, frae the top of thair heid to the soill of thair feit, befoir and behind, within and without. I curse them gangand [going], and I curse them rydand [riding], I curse thaim standand, and I curse thaim sittand; I curse them etand [eating], I curse thaim drinkand, I curse thaim walkland, I curse thaim sleepand, I curse thaim rysand, I curse thaim lyand; I curse thaim at hame, I curse thaim [..away..] fra hame, I curse them within the house, I curse thaim without the house, I curse thair wiffis, thair barnis [children], and thair servandis participand with thaim in thair deides. I wary [curse] thair cornys, thair catales, thair woll, thair scheip, thair horse, thair swyne, thair geise [geese], thair hennys, and all thair quyk gude [livestock]. I wary thair hallis, thair chalmeris [rooms], thair kechingis, thair stanillis [stables], thair barnys, thair biris [byres], thair bernyardis, thair cailyardis [vegetable-patches], thair plewis [ploughs], thair harrowis, and the gudis and housis that is necessair for their sustentatioun and weilfair.

The Monition not only curses the Reivers themselves, but their horses, their clothing, their crops, and all who aid them in any way. Gavin issued the curse in October 1525 during efforts for Anglo-Scottish peace at the instance of Cardinal Wolsey and Dr. Thomas Magnus.

== Death and legacy ==
Gavin Dunbar died on 30 April 1547.

He left a legacy of £800 for repairing Glasgow Cathedral. After the Scottish Reformation, on 22 April 1581, James VI gifted the income from a number of church lands bought with the money to Glasgow town for the church's upkeep.

== Footnotes ==
Religious titles
Preceded by James Beaton	Archbishop of Glasgow; 1524/5–47	Succeeded by Alexander Gordon
Political offices
Preceded by Archibald Douglas	Lord Chancellor of Scotland; 1528–43	Succeeded by David Beaton
