= William Tulloch =

William de Tulloch
- Bishop of Moray
- Church: Roman Catholic Church
- See: Diocese of Moray
- In office: 1477–1482
- Predecessor: David Stewart
- Successor: Andrew Stewart
- Previous post(s): Bishop of Orkney (1461–1477)

Orders
- Consecration: By 21 July 1462 (for Bishopric of Orkney)

Personal details
- Born: Early to mid-1400s Angus, Scotland
- Died: 14 April 1482; Moray, Scotland

William de Tulloch (died 1482) was a 15th-century Scottish prelate. A native of Angus, he became a canon of Orkney, almost certainly brought there by his relative Thomas de Tulloch, Bishop of Orkney. He was provided to the bishopric upon the resignation of his cousin by Pope Pius II at the Apostolic see on 11 December 1461. He had been consecrated by 21 July 1462, when he rendered an oath of fealty at Copenhagen to Christian I, King of Denmark, Norway and Sweden.

In 1468 he was one of the ambassadors responsible for organising the marriage between King James III of Scotland and Margaret of Denmark, the daughter of King Christian. The marriage resulted in the formal transfer of Orkney and Shetland to the sovereignty of the Scottish crown. He was Keeper of the Privy Seal of Scotland from 25 June 1470 onwards. He was sent to England in 1471 as an ambassador. He became tacksman, holding the administration of Orkney and Shetland from 27 August 1472 until 28 July 1478, continuing the role entrusted to him earlier by King Christian.

On 12 February 1477, following the death of David Stewart, he was rewarded for his extensive services by attaining translation to the Bishopric of Moray. On 21 March, his proctors at Rome, William and John of Paris, paid 642 gold florins and 43 shillings, presumably as payment for the new bishopric. He retained his position as Keeper of the Privy Seal until at least 1481. Tulloch remained Bishop of Moray until his death on 14 April 1482.

Political offices
Preceded by Thomas Spens; Bishop of Aberdeen	Keeper of the Privy Seal of Scotland; 1470–1482	Succeeded by Andrew Stewart
Religious titles
Preceded by Thomas Tulloch	Bishop of Orkney; 1461–1477	Succeeded by Andrew Pictoris
Preceded by David Stewart	Bishop of Moray; 1477–1482	Succeeded by Andrew Stewart
