= John de Winchester =

English cleric

- Bishop of Moray
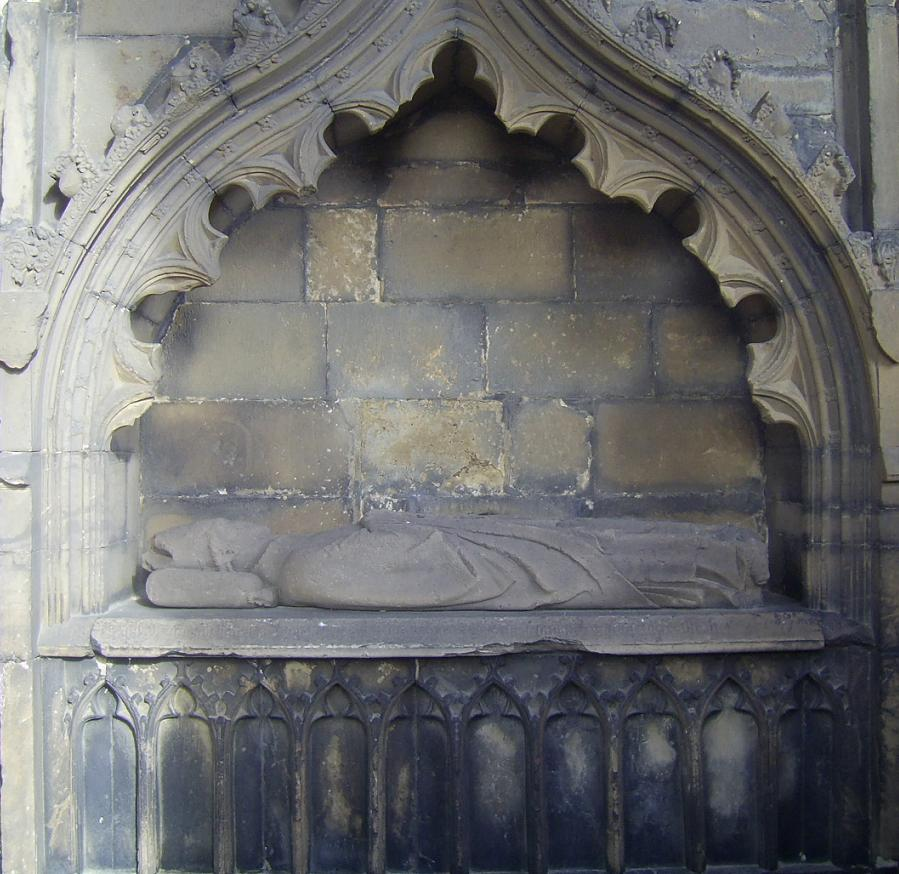
- Church: Roman Catholic Church
- See: Diocese of Moray
- In office: 1435–1460
- Predecessor: Columba de Dunbar
- Successor: James Stewart
- Previous post(s): Chancellor of Dunkeld

Orders
- Consecration: 9 May 1347, at Cambuskenneth Abbey

Personal details
- Born: Unknown; Probably Hampshire, England
- Died: 1 April 1460; Probably Spynie Castle

John de Winchester (died 1460) was a 15th-century English cleric who distinguished himself as an administrator and bishop in Scotland. Winchester was a student of canon law from 1418, graduating with a bachelorate in 1421.

He appears to have entered Scotland in 1424 after King James I of Scotland returned from his eighteen-year period as a hostage in England; it is notable and certainly relevant that James' queen, Joan Beaufort, was the niece of Henry Beaufort, Bishop of Winchester.

After entering Scotland, James was chaplain and secretary to the king, who bestowed on Winchester Alyth in Angus and helped him become Chancellor of Dunkeld. Winchester was out of Scotland in 1432, attending the Council of Basel on behalf of King James; he was also Clerk of the Register in this year.

He was Dean of Aberdeen in 1431, and was provided as Treasurer of the diocese of Glasgow sometime in 1431, but was not able to take up this position. However, he did become Provost of the Collegiate Church of Lincluden between 1434 and 1436.

Winchester's services to the king were rewarded further in November 1435 when, after the death of Columba de Dunbar, he was elected as Bishop of Moray. He was not, however, consecrated until 9 May 1437, a few months after the death of King James; his consecration took place at Cambuskenneth Abbey.

After becoming bishop, Winchester continued in the service of Queen Joan through the minority of James II of Scotland. James II later rewarded Winchester by creating Spynie as a burgh of Barony on 24 July 1451; after James II murdered the ex-regent William Douglas, 8th Earl of Douglas in 1452, Spynie's status was raised to that of burgh of regality.

Bishop Winchester died April, 1460, probably at Spynie Castle and was buried in St Mary's Aisle within Elgin Cathedral.

== Notes ==
Religious titles
Preceded by Columba de Dunbar	Bishop of Moray; 1435–1460	Succeeded by James Stewart
