= David Stewart (bishop) =

- Bishop of Moray
- Church: Roman Catholic Church
- See: Diocese of Moray
- In office: 1462–1476
- Predecessor: James Stewart
- Successor: William Tulloch
- Previous post(s): Archdeacon of Caithness, Dean of Ross, Treasurer of Moray, Treasurer of Caithness, Archdeacon of Brechin, Dean of Ross

Orders
- Consecration: 1463

Personal details
- Born: Early 15th century Probably Lorne, Argyll and Bute
- Died: 1476; Moray

David Stewart (Scottish Gaelic: Dàibhidh Stiùbhart) (died 1476) was a prelate from 15th century Scotland. A member of the Stewart kindred of Lorne, he is known to have held a succession of senior ecclesiastical positions in northern Scotland before eventually succeeding his brother James Stewart as Bishop of Moray.

David was provided to the bishopric before 30 June 1462 by Pope Pius II, and was consecrated sometime after 25 June 1463. David was a frequent attendee at parliament and was in the presence of King James III of Scotland on 5 August 1464, at Inverness. He built the great tower of Spynie Castle known as "David's Tower". He found himself in conflict with the Alexander, Earl of Huntly, who was at one point excommunicated until the differences were overcome by mediators.

Bishop David died in 1476. He was buried in the St Peter and St Paul aisle in the north of Elgin Cathedral, beside his brother. He was succeeded by William Tulloch.

Religious titles
Preceded by David Reid	Archdeacon of Caithness (?); 1440 (?)	Succeeded by James de Innes
Preceded by James de Innes	Dean of Ross; 1445	Succeeded by Alan Cant
Preceded by James de Innes	Treasurer of Moray; 1445–1446 x 1447	Succeeded by William de Wincester
Preceded by William Leuchars	Treasurer of Caithness; 1447–1448	Succeeded by Thomas de Dingwall
Preceded by David Hedewe	Archdeacon of Brechin; 1448	Succeeded by Richard Wylie
Preceded by John Cawdor	Dean of Ross; 1457	Succeeded by William Ogilvie
Preceded by James Stewart	Bishop of Moray; 1462–1476	Succeeded by William Tulloch
