= Bishop of Aberdeen =

List article of bishops of the Scottish church

The Bishop of Aberdeen (originally Bishop of Mortlach, in Latin Murthlacum) was the ecclesiastical head of the Diocese of Aberdeen, one of Scotland's 13 medieval bishoprics, whose first recorded bishop is an early 12th-century cleric named Nechtan. It appears that the episcopal seat had previously been at Mortlach (Mòrthlach), but was moved to Aberdeen during the reign of King David I of Scotland. The names of three bishops of Mortlach are known, the latter two of whom, "Donercius" and "Cormauch" (Cormac), by name only. The Bishop of Aberdeen broke communion with the Catholic Church after the Scottish Reformation. Following the Revolution of 1688, the office was abolished in the Church of Scotland, but continued in the Scottish Episcopal Church. A Roman Catholic Diocese of Aberdeen was recreated in 1878.

== Pre-Reformation bishops ==
=== List of bishops of Mortlach ===
Bishops of Mortlach
Tenure	Incumbent	Notes
fl. 1012	Beóán of Mortlach	One of the four known bishops of Mortlach. Known from other sources.
c. 1000s (decade)	"Donercius"	One of the four known bishops of Mortlach. Nothing more is known.
c. 1000s (decade)	Cormac of Mortlach	One of the four known bishops of Mortlach. Nothing more is known.
fl. 1131/2	Nechtan of Aberdeen	Became the first Bishop of Aberdeen in April 1132

=== List of known bishops of Aberdeen ===
The Bishopric of Aberdeen, as the Bishopric of Aberdeen, appears to date from the 1130s, as does the list of known bishops.

Pre-Reformation Bishops of Aberdeen
From	Until	Incumbent	Notes
fl. 1131/2		Nechtan of Aberdeen	Previously Bishop of Mortlach, moved to Aberdeen April 1132.
fl. 1147/51-1171		Edward of Aberdeen	
1172	1199	Matthew	
1199	1207	John of Kelso	
1207	1228	Adam de Kald	
1228	1229	Matthew the Scot (bishop-elect)	Matthew or Mata had been the chancellor of William the Lion, King of Scots. He was postulated to the see of Aberdeen, before in turn being postulated to the higher-ranking see of Dunkeld. At any rate, he died before consecration. His name indicates that he was a Gael, but we do not know anything else about his background.
1228	1239	Gilbert de Stirling	
1239	1247	Radulf de Lamley	
1247	1256	Peter de Ramsay	
1256	1270/2	Richard de Potton	
1272	1281/2	Hugh de Benin	
1282	1328	Henry le Chen	
1329		Walter Herok (bishop-elect)	He died at Avignon, perhaps before being consecrated.
1329	1343/4	Alexander de Kininmund (I.)	
1344	1350	William de Deyn	
1350	1354/5	John de Rait	
1355	1380	Alexander de Kininmund (II.)	
1380		Simon de Ketenis (bishop-elect)	Elected by chapter sometime after 31 August, but was provided instead as Dean of Aberdeen on 18 November 1380.
1380	1389	Adam de Tyninghame	
1389	1421	Gilbert de Greenlaw	
1422	1440	Henry de Lichton	Translated from Moray.
1441	1458	Ingram Lindsay	
1458	1480	Thomas Spens	Translated from Galloway.
1480	1483	Robert Blackadder (bishop-elect)	Translated to Galloway.
1483	1514	William Elphinstone	Translated from Ross; he is one of the greatest of all medieval Scottish bishops, and is remembered today for, among other things, founding the University of Aberdeen.
1514/5	1518	Alexander Gordon	
bef. 1515	1516	Robert Forman	Provided by Pope, but resigned without ever possessing.
1518	1532	Gavin Dunbar	
1529	1531	George Learmond (coadjutor bishop only)	Learmond had been appointed Dunbar's successor in 1529, but he died before Dunbar did.
1532	1545	William Stewart	
1545	1577	William Gordon	Because of the Scottish Reformation of 1560, he was the last bishop owing allegiance to Rome.

== Post-Reformation bishops ==
=== Church of Scotland succession ===
Church of Scotland Bishops of Aberdeen
From	Until	Incumbent	Notes
1577	1600	David Cunningham	
1600	1616	Peter Blackburn	
1616	1617	Alexander Forbes	Translated from Caithness.
1618	1635	Patrick Forbes	
1635	1638	Adam Bellenden	Translated from Dunblane; died in 1648.
1638	1662	Bishops were abolished in Scotland during the Interregnum.	
1662	1663	David Mitchel	
1663	1664	Alexander Burnet	Translated to Glasgow.
1664	1682	Patrick Scougal	
1682	1689	George Haliburton	Deprived of the temporalities when episcopacy was permanently abolished in the Church of Scotland in 1689. Continued as a nonjuring bishop in the Scottish Episcopal Church.

=== Scottish Episcopal Church succession ===
Scottish Episcopal Church Bishops of Aberdeen
From	Until	Incumbent	Notes
1689	1715	George Haliburton	After the Glorious Revolution, he continued as a nonjuring bishop
1715	1721	See vacant	
1721	1724	Archibald Campbell	Resigned.
1724	1733	James Gadderar	
1733	1746	William Dunbar	Translated from Moray.
1747	1767	Andrew Gerard	
1768	1786	Robert Kilgour	Also Primus (1778–1788); resigned.
1786	1816	John Skinner	Also Primus (1788–1816).
1816	1857	William Skinner	Also Primus (1841–1857); son of the preceding.
1857	1864	Thomas Suther	Became Bishop of Aberdeen and Orkney
Bishops of Aberdeen and Orkney
From	Until	Incumbent	Notes
1865	1883	Thomas Suther	Died in office.
1883	1905	Arthur Douglas	Died in office.
1906	1911	Rowland Ellis	Died in office.
1912	1917	Anthony Mitchell	Died in office.
1917	1943	Frederic Deane	
1943	1955	Herbert Hall	Died in office.
1956	1972	Frederick Easson	
1973	1976	Ian Begg	
1976	1991	Frederick Darwent	
1991	2006	Bruce Cameron	Installed 1992, Primus 2000–2006.
2006	2016	Robert (Bob) Gillies	
2018	Incumbent	Anne Dyer	First female bishop in the SEC

=== Restored Roman Catholic succession ===
(Any dates appearing in italics indicate de facto continuation of office. The start date of tenure below is the date of appointment or succession. Where known, the date of installation and ordination as bishop are listed in the notes together with the post held prior to appointment.)

The modern Bishop of Aberdeen is the Ordinary of the Roman Catholic Diocese of Aberdeen in the Province of Saint Andrews and Edinburgh. The diocese covers 29,068 km^{2}. The see is in the City of Aberdeen where the seat is located at the Cathedral Church of Saint Mary of the Assumption. The Apostolic Vicariate of the Northern District (formerly the Apostolic Vicariate of the Highland District) was elevated to diocese status on 4 March 1878. The current bishop is the Right Reverend Hugh Gilbert, 11th Bishop of Aberdeen.

Vicars Apostolic of the Highland District
From	Until	Incumbent	Notes
16 September 1727	19 September 1727	Father Alexander John Grant	Died in office.
12 February 1731	12 March 1773	Bishop Hugh MacDonald	Priest; died in office.
12 March 1773	9 May 1779	Bishop John MacDonald	Previously coadjutor Vicar Apostolic; died in office.
30 September 1779	9 September 1791	Bishop Alexander MacDonald	Priest; died in office.
8 November 1791	8 July 1814	Bishop John Chisholm	Priest; died in office.
8 July 1814	31 July 1818	Bishop Aeneas Chisholm	Previously coadjutor Vicar Apostolic; died in office.
27 August 1819	13 February 1827	Bishop Ranald MacDonald	Became Vicar Apostolic of the Western District.
Vicars Apostolic of the Northern District
From	Until	Incumbent	Notes
13 February 1827	23 February 1869	Bishop James Kyle	Priest; died in office
23 February 1869	15 March 1878	Bishop John MacDonald	Previously coadjutor Vicar Apostolic; became Bishop of Aberdeen.
Roman Catholic Bishops of Aberdeen
From	Until	Incumbent	Notes
15 March 1878	4 February 1889	John MacDonald	Previously Vicar Apostolic of the Northern District; died in office.
16 July 1889	26 September 1889	Colin Grant	Priest; ordained 13 August 1889; died in office.
14 August 1890	29 May 1898	Hugh MacDonald CSSR	Priest of the Congregation of the Most Holy Redeemer; ordained 23 October 1890; died in office.
7 January 1899	13 January 1918	Aeneas Chisholm	Priest; ordained 24 February 1899; died in office.
18 June 1918	25 December 1946	George Bennett	Priest; ordained 1 August 1918; died in office.
2 August 1947	5 July 1950	John Matheson	Priest; ordained 24 September 1947; died in office.
20 June 1951	22 July 1963	Francis Walsh MAfr	Priest of the Missionaries of Africa (White Fathers); ordained 12 September 1951; resigned.
8 December 1964	28 May 1976	Michael Foylan	Priest; ordained 25 March 1965; died in office.
28 February 1977	15 January 2002	Mario Conti	Priest of Aberdeen; ordained 3 May 1977; translated to Glasgow.
13 October 2003	4 June 2011	Peter Moran	Priest of Aberdeen; ordained 1 December 2003; resigned 4 June 2011.
4 June 2011	present	Hugh Gilbert OSB	Abbot of Pluscarden (1992-2011); appointed 4 June 2011; ordained 15 August 2011.

== See also ==
- Bishops in the Church of Scotland

== Bibliography ==
- Dowden, John (1912). Thomson, J. Maitland (ed.). The Bishops of Scotland. Glasgow: James Maclehose and Son.
- Fryde, E. B.; Greenway, D. E.; Porter, S.; Roy, I., eds. (1986). Handbook of British Chronology (3rd, reprinted 2003 ed.). Cambridge: Cambridge University Press. ISBN 0-521-56350-X.
- Scott, Hew (1928). Fasti Ecclesiae Scoticanae. Vol. 7 (New ed.). Edinburgh: Oliver and Boyd.
