= St. Lesmo of Glen Tanar =

Scottish hermit

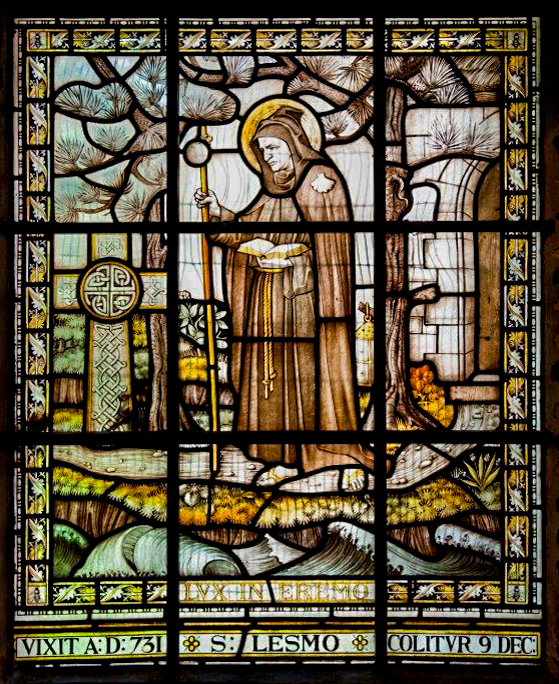
St Lesmo - Chapel on Glen Tanar Estate, Scotland - Glen Tanar Ranger Service

St. Lesmo of Glen Tanar (c. 700 – c. 780) is the name given to a holy hermit who it is believed lived in Glen Tanar Aberdeenshire Scotland in the eighth century. He is recorded by Thomas Dempster as a "saint" in the seventeenth century. His claimed Saints’ Day is 9 December.

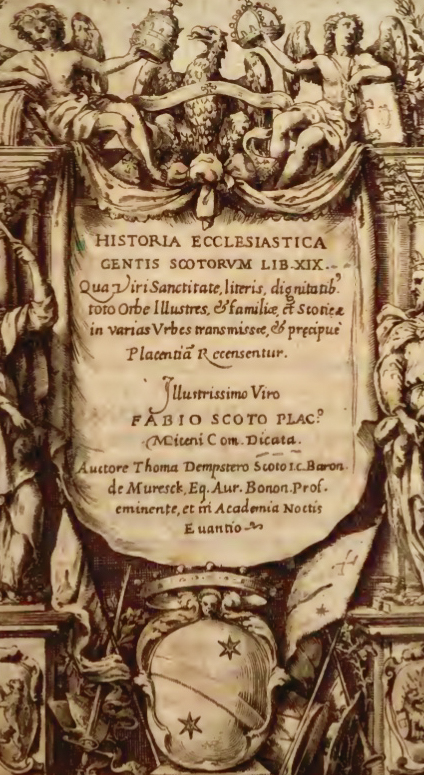
Thomas Dempster's Historia Ecclesiastica

There is no reference to a Lesmo in the Aberdeen Breviary (1507). This omission raises doubts regarding Lesmo and claims for his Sainthood. Sixteen saints are recorded as being active during a period from c. 500 AD to c. 800 AD along the River Dee, Aberdeenshire. The Aberdeen Breviary lists 81 saints, including twelve associated with Deeside. Nevertheless, he is recorded by many Scottish writers in the late nineteenth and early twentieth centuries. In 1871, a private Scottish Episcopal Church chapel was dedicated to Lesmo by Bishop Thomas Suther, Bishop of Diocese of Aberdeen and Orkney. The chapel was part of a grand building scheme by William Cunliffe Brooks on his new estate. The chapel has a fine stained-glass window commemorating Lesmo. Lesmo stands in front of what looks like the South side of the church. Below is the aphorism, "LUX IN EREMO"; translated as "Light in the Wilderness". It has been suggested that "LUX IN EREMO", might be code for "LUX IN ER(S)MO". A second text along the bottom of the window reads “VIXIT AD 731 COLITUR 9 DEC” “He lived in AD 731 – Commemorate him on the 9th. December”. Almost certainly the face of St Lesmo in this panel is based on a photograph or cartoon of Cunliffe Brooks. The designer of the window gave Lesmo a staff with a scallop shell on his left shoulder suggesting a pilgrim saint. The scallop shell refers to Saint James who is the patron saint of pilgrims and of the Camino de Santiago. It is unknown where the stained-glass was originally located as its current position, in the north wall, was the location of the original entrance into the chapel. Looking at the Lesmo window from the outside, the lintel contains an inscription “VENITE ADOREMUS” - “Come Ye, Let us Adore”.

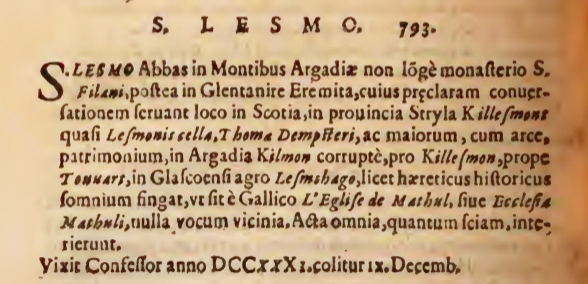
Thomas Dempster's record for a St Lesmo

== Lesmo as a Saint ==
It is claimed that he "ministered" to travellers on the Firmounth path. If there had been a "holy hermit" in the eighth century, it is likely that places would have been named after him. There are no examples of the name "Lesmo" in Aberdeenshire. There are some claims for a Hermit’s Cave or Hermit’s Well in Glen Tanar. A Hermit’s Well was recorded near Porphyry Bridge on a 1955 UK Ordnance Survey map. This location, near the Water of Tanar, is about 4 km. to the SW of St Lesmo’s Chapel and Glen Tanar House. This site is not marked on the latest Ordnance Survey map.

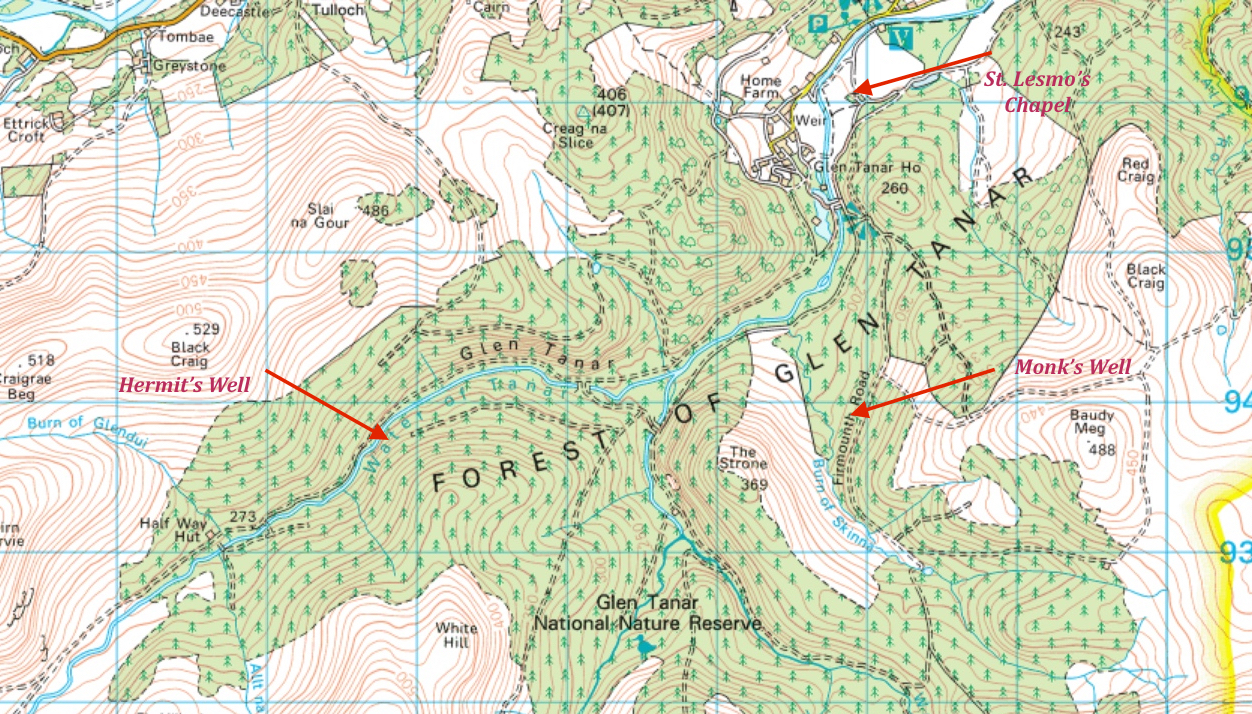
Location of Wells associated with St Lesmo of Glen Tanar

The exact location of this well is unknown. There is a Monk's Well marked on some maps adjacent to the Firmounth Road. It is probable that Monk's Well might have been applied to this spring by William Cunliffe Brooks.

== The Name Lesmo ==
Scots Gaelic gives no clues to the possible derivation of the name "Lesmo". Reversing some of the letters of the name might provide a possibility. For example, there is evidence for an E l m o known as ELMO or Erasmus in Fife. The place-name Lesmahagow refers to a community near Lanark. No connection between Lesmahagow, Erasmus, Elmo or Lesmo is found in this part of Scotland.

== St. Lesmo's Chapel in Glen Tanar ==
In the early 1600s a family named Garden, acquired property in Glen Tanar. In c.1639 they took up residence in what was called the House of Braeloine. In 1869 Sir William Cunliffe Brooks became tenant of the Glen Tanar estate. Braeloine House was in ruins and Cunliffe Brooks undertook an extensive building programme. He built a chapel from the ruined walls of the old Braeloine House, incorporating into it, as the entrance, a yett or arched iron gateway.

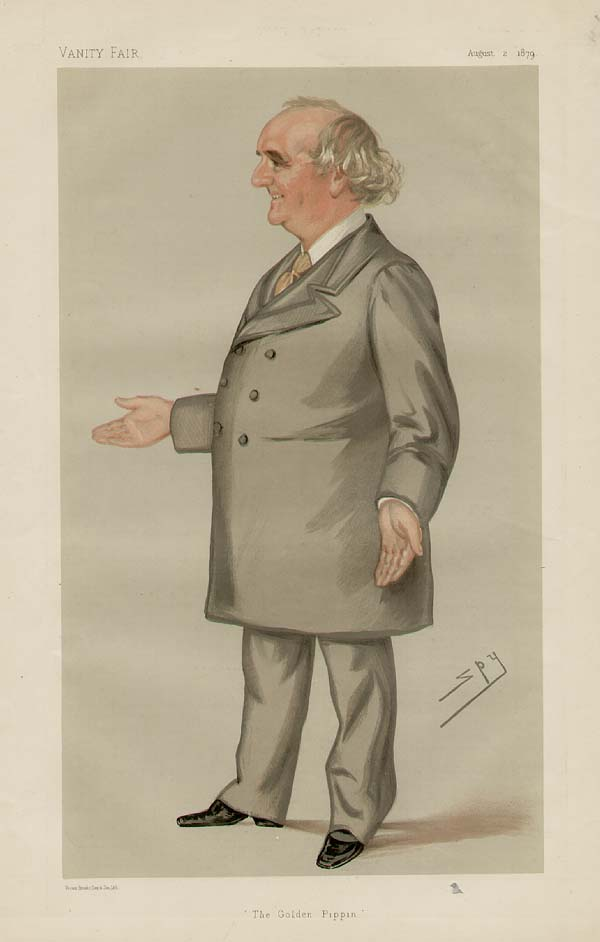
William Cunliffe Brooks, Vanity Fair, 1879-08-02

The chapel was built with a thatched roof and stained-glass windows. The spaces between the stones of the walls are dotted with small pebbles. A technique called locally cherry-cocking. In the chapel, the rafters were whole trees minus the bark; and the joists were twisted branches of locally grown Scotch Fir (Pinus sylvestris). The pulpit and seats were in the same style, coated with stainless varnish. The ceiling was emblazoned with gilded stars with convex centres of silvered glass. The altar piece was covered with rich purple and surmounted by an oil painting of the Virgin and Child. The altar steps were of local granite. At a later stage, deer skulls with antlers were hung from the roof with the year they had been shot and the initials of the marksman imprinted on them. An organ was placed at the west end of the Chapel. Outside a bell was hung which was cast to order and bears the inscription "St Lesmo". The Chapel was consecrated on 15 November 1871.

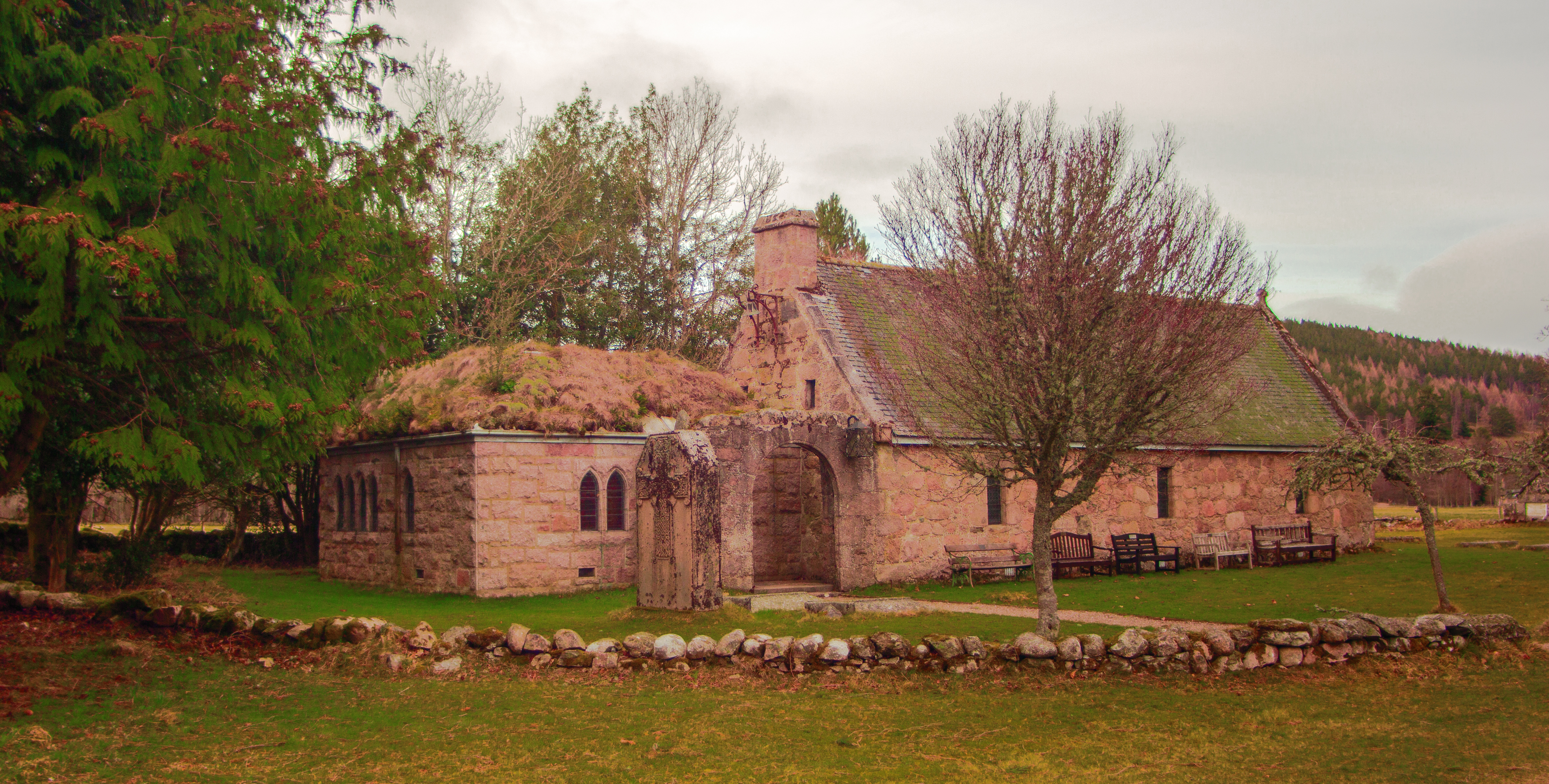
St Lesmo's Chapel, Glen Tanar

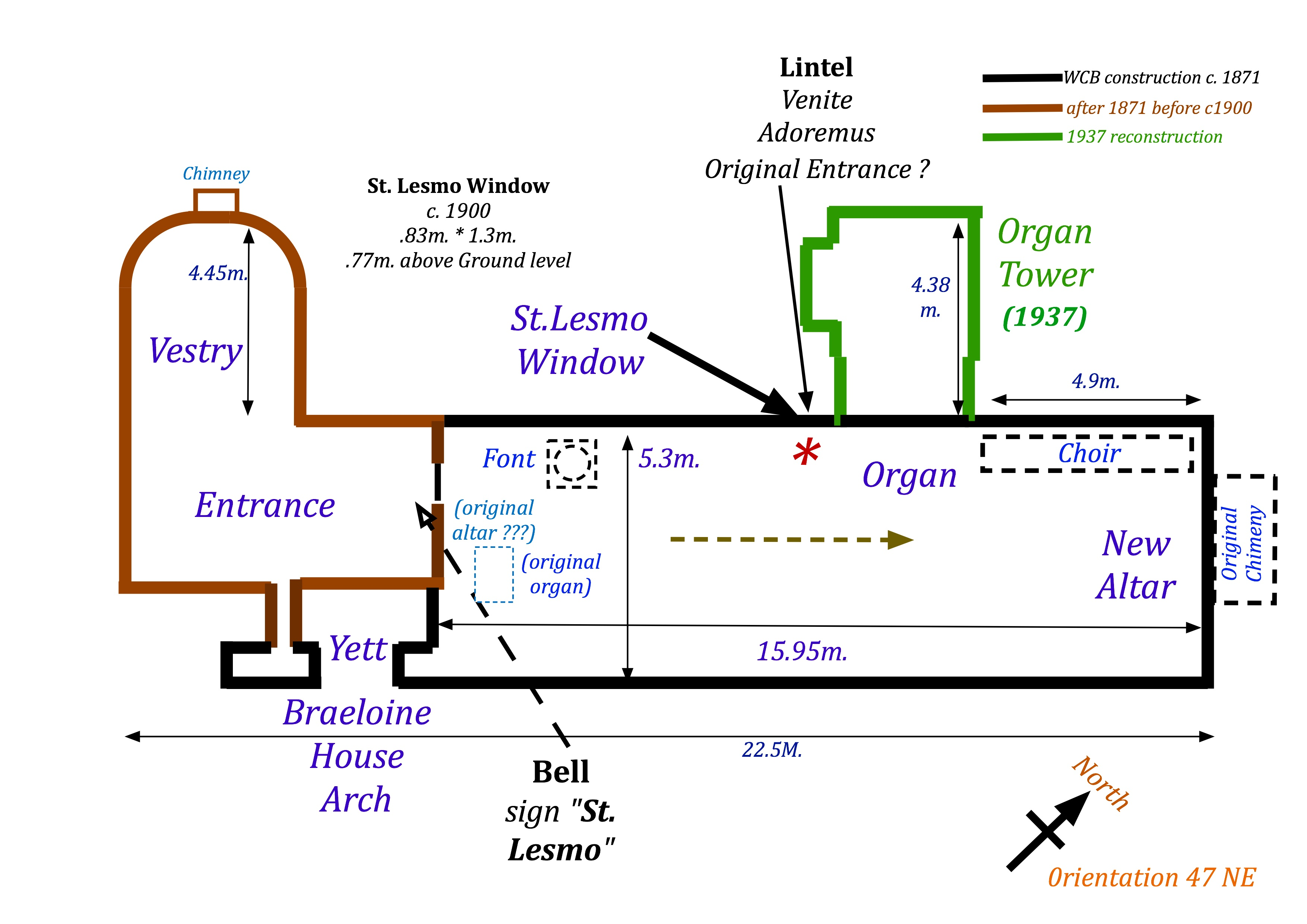
Outline of St Lesmo's Chapel 2019

The Bishop, at the consecration said, "….. we dedicate and consecrate it as a chapel to the sacred name of God, to His service and worship … and in pious memory of the holy hermit St. Lesmo …." In 1871 the Marquess of Huntly owned the ground on which the chapel was built. However, in 1872 this ground was feued to the Bishop of Aberdeen and Orkney and his successors as Trustees of the Scottish Episcopal Church solely for use as an interdenominational private chapel. The chapel is used for private weddings.

The figure to the right marks the location of the "St. Lesmo" stained-glass window. [*]

Contemporary sketch by the architect George Truefitt of the chapel of St Lesmo, c 1879.

Contemporary Sketch by George Truefitt showing the rear of the Chapel before reconstruction

It appears that the original entrance to the building was at the rear of the current entrance. Truefitt enhanced the ruins and inserted an entrance through the ruined archway.

== The Status of St. Lesmo ==
The lack of evidence for a saint called Lesmo does not mean that there is no oral history. Lesmo is recorded by many authors in guide books and descriptions of the Glen Tanar Estate. The nineteenth century "The Records of Aberdeen" or any of the various Spalding Club publications make no reference of s saint with the name Lesmo. The status of sainthood is generally a matter for the Western Christian Church. The Catholic Church does not officially recognise him. He has not been awarded a Saint’s Day. The Church of Scotland and other Reformed Churches do not recognise the beatification or canonisation of individuals. The Scottish Episcopal Church allows a dedication to an individual, for example to a Church, if there is community support. It is probable that during the eight century, many anchorite or hermits would have been found along the River Dee, Aberdeenshire. A likely location to the west of the Cairn O’Mount path would be the Firmounth path. As a hermit he would have been one of the early Christian evangelists, e.g. St Ternan (Banchory), or St Erchard (Kincardine O’Neil) may have lived on or near the Firmounth path. "Lesmo" could have been such a hermit. St. Lesmo's name lives on in the dedication given by William Cunliffe Brooks to his chapel, the bell he had cast for it, and in the stained-glass window set into its wall.

== Additional Reading ==
1. "The Chapel of Lesmo: Glen Tanar." n.d. Episcopal Church in Scotland. Aberdeen: Episcopal Church in Scotland.

2. Boardman, Steve and Williamson, Eila (Eds). 2010. The Cult of Saints and the Virgin Mary in Medieval Scotland (Boydell Press: Woodbridge).

3. Butler, Hubert. 1972. Ten thousand saints : a study in Irish & European origins (Wellbrook Press: Kilkenny, Ireland).

4. Cooper, Patrick, and Aberdeen Ecclesiological Society. 1893. Calendar of Scottish saints (Aberdeen Ecclesiological Soc.: Aberdeen).

5. Fouin, Francois Louis Pierre, and Steve Robertson. 2005. The early life and times of a Glen Tanar exile : memoirs of an Anglo-French Scot (Librario Publishing Ltd.: Kinloss).

6. Fouin, Francois Louis Pierre. 2009. Glen Tanar : valley of echoes and hidden treasures (Leopard Press: Inverurie).

7. Historic Scotland, GLEN TANAR ESTATE, ST LESMO'S CHAPEL, INCLUDING BOUNDARY WALL LB44, http://portal.historicenvironment.scot/designation/LB44; (accessed 10/3/19).

8. St Lesmo’s Episcopal Chapel, http://www.scottishchurches.org.uk/sites/site/id/3874/name/St+Lesmo%27s+Episcopal+Chapel+Aboyne+and+Glen Tanar+Grampian (accessed 10/3/19).

9. McConnochie, Alexander Inkson. 1895. Deeside (Smith: Aberdeen), pp 86–91.

10. Turpie, Tom. 2016. "North-East Saints in the Aberdeen Breviary and the Histori Gentis Scotorum of Hector Boece; Liturgy, History and religious Practice in Late Medieval Scotland". In, Jane Geddes (ed.), Medieval Art, Architecture and Archaeology in the Dioceses of Aberdeen and Moray (Routledge & British Archaeological Association: London).

11. Wyness, Fenton 1968. Royal Valley : the story of the Aberdeenshire Dee (Alex P. Reid: G.B.).

12. Wyness, Fenton, and Deeside Field Club. 1950. Royal Deeside (Mearns: Aberdeen).

13. Wyness, Fenton. 1942. Book of legends : tales of the north-east of Scotland told to children (W. & W. Lindsay: Aberdeen).
