= James Wiseman (priest) =

Scottish Anglican priest (??–1955)

James Wiseman (died 20 November 1955) was an Anglican priest of the Scottish Episcopal Church. He was Dean of Aberdeen and Orkney from 1910 to 1922.

He was educated at the University of Aberdeen, graduating with an undergraduate Master of Arts (MA Hons) and was later awarded an honorary Doctor of Divinity (DD) degree.

He was ordained in the Scottish Episcopal Church in 1870. He served his curacy in Alford, Aberdeenshire. He was Rector of St Machar's Church, Bucksburn from 1874 until 1922. He was additionally Dean of Aberdeen and Orkney from 1910 to 1922.

He died on 20 November 1925.

Religious titles
Preceded by James Myers Danson	Dean of Aberdeen and Orkney; 1910–1922	Succeeded by Robert Mackay
