= James Wiseman (disambiguation) =

James Wiseman (born 2001) is an American basketball player.

James Wiseman may also refer to:

- James Wiseman (cricketer) (1816–1839), English first-class cricketer and British Army officer
- James Wiseman (priest) (before 1870 – 1955), dean of Aberdeen and Orkney
- Jim Wiseman (born 1949), Canadian politician
