= Alexander Adamson =

Scottish Episcopal provost (1921–1983)

Alexander Adamson (21 June 1921 – 3 September 1983) was Provost of St Andrew's Cathedral, Aberdeen from 1978 to 1983.

Adamson went to school in Springburn and was the Glasgow Welfare Department until he enlisted in the RAF in 1941. When peace returned he worked for the National Assistance Board. He studied for the priesthood at Lichfield Theological College and was ordained in 1959. After a curacy in Pontefract he was Vicar of Honley with Brockholes from 1962 to 1969; Rector of St John the Evangelist, Aberdeen from 1969 to 1978.

Anglican Communion titles
Preceded by Frederick Darwent	Dean of Aberdeen and Orkney; 1983–1988	Succeeded by Denis Bovey
