= Henry Cheyne =

Henry Cheyne may refer to:

- Henry Cheyne, 1st Baron Cheyne (1540–1587), English politician
- Henry le Chen or Cheyne, late 13th-century and early 14th-century Scoto-Norman bishop
