= John Comper =

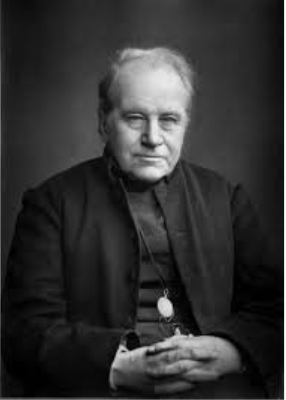
Photo of John Comper

Reverend John Comper (1823–1903) was a priest of the Scottish Episcopal Church who dedicated his life to helping the street children and prostitutes of Victorian Aberdeen. In 2003 Father Comper was declared a 'Hero of the Faith' by the Scottish Episcopal Church – the equivalent of a saint and the greatest honour the Church can bestow. In the Calendar of the Scottish Episcopal Church he is remembered on 27 July, the day of his death.

== Origins ==
John Comper was born in Nutbourne, Pulborough in Sussex, on 1 October 1823, where his father farmed a smallholding. John was the youngest of a family of seven.

The family name "Comper" is a French surname possibly from Brittany; the Comper forebears being probably sixteenth-century Huguenot refugees though this is disputed by Anthony Symondson who argues the family is more likely of Norman origin.

From his earliest years he was very interested in matters spiritual, and fascinated by the liturgy, which he studied throughout his life. At the age of 24 he completed training as a student teacher at a college in Chichester. He was aware that without a university degree he would not be accepted for the priesthood in England, and therefore he turned his attention to Scotland, where the Scottish Episcopal Church was in need of clergy.

== Career ==
Already an adherent to the principles of the Oxford Movement, he began ecclesiastical life as a lay reader at a church school in Kirriemuir. He moved from Kirriemuir to Crieff to take part in the educational work at St Margaret's College which had been started by the Revd Alexander Lendrum, embarking on a special course of study in preparation for Holy Orders. St Ninian's Cathedral, Perth was consecrated on Tuesday 10 December 1850, and the following day, Comper was ordained deacon in the Cathedral by Bishop Alexander Penrose Forbes on behalf of the aged Diocesan Patrick Torry, then in his 43rd year of his prelacy. The preacher at that service was the Rev. J. M. Neale, the hymn-writer, with whom the young Comper kept up a warm friendship.

He was ordained priest at Crieff prior to his appointment at Nairn. In Nairn he was to take charge of a new Mission raised to mitigate the effects of a schism that had arisen within the newly formed congregation of St Ninian's Church built in 1845. This congregation in refusing to accept the authority of the bishop became an "English" episcopal chapel. Comper also opened a school in Nairn and his success soon drew the attention of the Episcopal authorities.

Bishop Robert Eden, newly consecrated in Edinburgh on 9 March 1851, recruited Comper to take services in an upper room in Nairn, before appointing him as Diocesan Mission Priest for the Moray Diocese and as Bishop's Chaplain. Whilst based in Inverness Comper opened another day school and a chapel, now represented by St Andrew's Cathedral. Comper was also put in charge of the newly created Mission at Cromarty before returning to the Brechin Diocese to fill the vacancy at Stonehaven in 1857.

He took charge of the ancient congregation that originally met at the Stonehaven Tolbooth, but had removed long since the Jacobite rising of 1745 and Duke of Cumberland's occupation of the chapel as a stable for his horses, to the Stonehaven High Street site. This meeting house was demolished on Cumberland's orders in 1746. Services were then held clandestinely for some years in a house in the High Street. Later a "Qualified Chapel" was built in Cameron Street, the two congregations as yet existing as separate entities. The Qualified Congregation joined the Scottish Episcopal Church in 1803, but it took a further twelve years for them to amalgamate in a union whereupon they moved back into the old Qualified Chapel, this time as a full-fledged congregation of the Episcopal Church. It was in this building that Comper ministered from 1857 to 1861.

In Aberdeen, the Patrons of St John's Episcopal Church, Dr George Grub and Dr George Ogilvie beseeched Comper to come to the parish. The Rev. Frederick G. Lee had absconded from St John's and his predecessor Patrick Cheyne, had been prosecuted by Bishop Thomas Suther for his Tractarian "Six Sermons". In Comper's own diocese, Bishop Alexander Forbes was then under prosecution from the Episcopal College of Bishops. Comper only left the Brechin Diocese when his Diocesan was out of trouble, and did not make further waves by leaving his charge vacant.

Suther began a tirade against Comper. His biographer, "LTA", gives a risible account of the situation thus: "Comper's first act was to initiate the partial use of the Scottish Communion Office — the date being shortly before the General Synod of 1863, and an appeal against Bishop Suther's attempted objections was successful. Here and in another question of ceremonial Dr Grub's unrivalled historical knowledge and genuine Churchmanship were of greatest value". Grub's genial humour came out in the account he gave of the Bishop who bade his presbyter, like a naughty boy, "take off his vestments and put out his lights." In the end the lights were saved, but the vestments surrendered.

Two significant events took place during the first years of Comper's incumbency at St John's. Firstly, a day school was built and dedicated to Revd Patrick Cheyne's forty years association with St John's. Secondly, in the year 1863 the first sister arrived from the Society of Saint Margaret, the foundress of St Margaret's Convent, 17 Spital, Aberdeen (closed in 2003).

== The Gallowgate mission ==
Comper was more interested in the welfare of the poor and resigned the charge at St John's in 1870 to spend more time in the mission he had founded in the Gallowgate slums of Aberdeen in 1867. Wright describes the scene as follows; "The whole area enjoyed an evil reputation. No one ventured out after dark. It was bad enough making your way to church through wet washings, but you also had to hold your nose to prevent smelling the fish barrows parked along one side of the Gallowgate. Often rats were scavenging in the barrows." From this mission, St Margaret's, Gallowgate, emanated the subsequent mission at St Clement's-on-the-Quay, which eventually became an independent congregation erecting a church on the quayside with money bequeathed by Sir George Reid's widow, Margaret Best, one of Comper's ardent admirers.

He became the chief motivator in the organisation, eventually raising the Episcopal charge in 1870 dedicated to St Margaret of Scotland. Comper was the first clergyman in Aberdeen to organise a congregation social meeting, which he called a "Refection". His other memorable project, apart from St Margaret's and its Convent, was his work for foreign aid which banded together many of the Church's Women's Organisations in common cause.

A kenspeckle figure in Aberdeen city and a veteran clergyman of the Aberdeen Diocese, he enjoyed meritorious respect from all classes of the population.

== Death ==
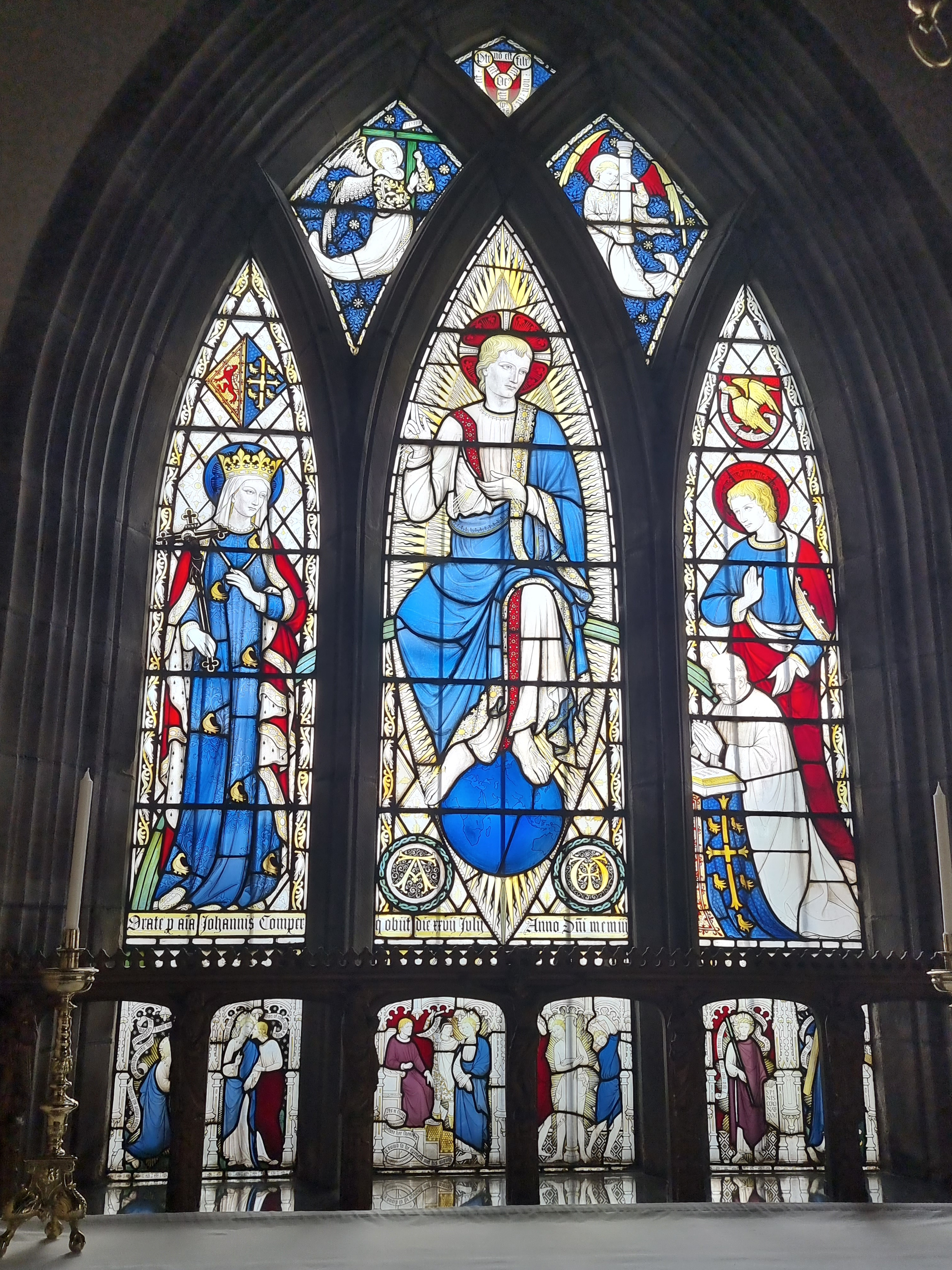
John Comper is depicted in this window by his son in St Margaret of Scotland, Aberdeen

The Revd John Comper died suddenly in the Duthie Park on Monday 27 July 1903, where he had gone with his wife. Coincidentally, it was the first visit he had made to the park as he had been tempted to enjoy the fine weather Aberdeen was experiencing at that time. The Press & Journal wrote, "He sat in the park and expressed his admiration for all that he saw, saying how surprised he was that the vicinity of Aberdeen contained a place of such varied beauty. He then went to the refreshment room to get some strawberries for his wife and on his return to the bench where she was seated he was observed to stagger and fall. In a short time he was found to be dead. During the morning we understand he had been in his usual health but complained of drowsiness; otherwise his condition had excited no remark. He was never very strong in health, but was able by an annual tour on the Continent to maintain himself in comparative vigour."

== Family ==
Anthony Symondson tells that thereafter his eldest son, Ninian Comper, signed all his painted glass windows with a wild strawberry, the leaves and stems entwining the date of execution. The first window to be so signed was his father's own memorial in St Margaret of Scotland, Aberdeen in 1908.

John Comper married Ellen Taylor of Hull in 1853; they had five children. Mrs Ellen Comper died on 10 June 1908. Ninian Comper, born in 1864, was to become one of the greatest church architects of the twentieth century, being knighted in 1950 at the age of 84. Ninian's son, Nicholas Comper, became an aeronautical engineer who designed the Comper Swift.
