= John Kelso =

John Kelso may refer to:

- John R. Kelso, American politician, author, lecturer and school principal
- J. J. Kelso (John Joseph Kelso), newspaper reporter and social crusader
- John of Kelso, Tironensian monk and bishop
