= John Wattie =

John Wattie was Dean of Aberdeen and Orkney from 1948 to 1953.

He was educated at King's College London and ordained in 1909. After curacies in Clapton Park and Aberdeen he held incumbencies in Kirkwall, Cambuslang, Dundee and Aboyne until his appointment as Dean.

== Notes ==
Religious titles
Preceded by George Bartlet	Dean of Aberdeen and Orkney; 1948–1953	Succeeded by Frederick Easson
