= Alexander de Kininmund (bishop, died 1344) =

Scottish churchman

Alexander de Kininmund (died 1344) was a 14th-century Scottish churchman. The first mention of Alexander occurs when, as a canon of Dunkeld he is one of three ambassadors sent by King Robert I of Scotland to Avignon in 1320. The purpose of this embassy was to present a letter to Pope John XXII known as the Declaration of Arbroath. As a papal chaplain and lawyer, he was well qualified to argue the Scottish cause, and Barrow makes a strong case that he was, in fact the author of the document.

== Biography ==
He became Archdeacon of Lothian in 1327, and by 1329 held a prebend in the diocese of Brechin; he is also a papal chaplain and an auditor of the papal palace at Avignon.

In that year, after the death of Henry le Chen, Walter Herok was elected Bishop of Aberdeen and travelled to Avignon to receive consecration from Pope John XXII. However, Walter died there, apparently before receiving consecration, and Alexander, a papal servant from Scotland, was provided to the now vacant see without any consultation of the chapter of Aberdeen.

Alexander was back in Scotland by 29 March 1330, when he attended a parliament of King David II of Scotland. Four years later, on 12 February 1334, he was present at the parliament of the usurper-king Edward Balliol. In 1335 he was one of the envoys sent to make peace with England. According to Hector Boece, Alexander was a distinguished scholar and began work on building four new episcopal residences, at Mortlach, Aberdeen, Fetternear and Rayne; Aberdeen and Fetterneir were said to have been completed. He died sometime before 13 September 1344.

== Notes ==
Religious titles
Preceded by William de Eaglesham	Archdeacon of Lothian; 1327–1329	Succeeded by William Comyn
Preceded by Walter Herok	Bishop of Aberdeen; 1329–1343 x 1344	Succeeded by William de Deyn
