= Ormskirk Grammar School =

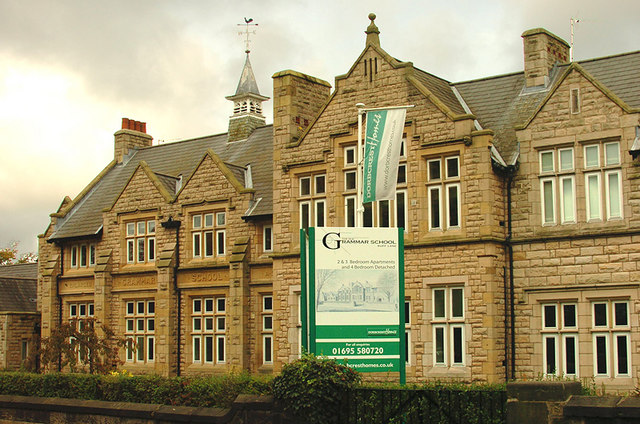
- The school building seen in 2009 while being converted to flats

Location
- Ruff Lane; Ormskirk, Lancashire, L39 4QY; England; 53.5650°N 2.8795°W

Information
- Type: Grammar school, later comprehensive
- Established: 1610
- Closed: 2001
- Local authority: Lancashire
- Gender: Mixed
- Age: 11 to 18

Ormskirk Grammar School was a school in Ormskirk, West Lancashire, England.

== History ==
It was founded circa 1610 and moved from the original school house at Barkhouse Hill to Ruff Lane in 1850. The architect Sydney Smirke designed the original school room and school masters' house which is to the west of the main school building. The school was consistently extended for the next 150 years to extend either side of Mill Street. It was situated in the east of the town, towards the hospital.

In the 1960s it had 750 boys and girls, and 850 in the early 1970s.

=== Comprehensive ===
The final intake of pupils who sat the 11 plus examination was in 1975. The following year Ormskirk Grammar School became a comprehensive school with around 1,000 boys and girls.

== Closure ==
Ormskirk Grammar School closed when the school amalgamated with Cross Hall High School, resulting in the formation of Ormskirk School in 2001 and was largely demolished to make way for housing in 2005 leaving only the original building on Ruff Lane which has now been converted into flats.

== Archives ==
The school's archives are held at Lancashire Archives.

== Notable former pupils ==
- Julie Conalty, Bishop of Birkenhead
- John P. Marshall, British businessman
- Lee Cain, former journalist and Downing Street Director of Communications, 2019–2020
- Ray Connolly, novelist
- Frederick Charles Darwent, Bishop of Aberdeen and Orkney, 1978–92
- Vickey Dixon, hockey player
- Arthur Greer, 1st Baron Fairfield, Lord Justice of Appeal, 1927–38
- Tom Middlehurst, Welsh Assembly Member from 1999 to 2003 for Alyn and Deeside
- Helen Hayes, Labour Member of Parliament since 2015 for Dulwich and West Norwood
- Alyson Rudd, sports journalist with The Times
- Professor Edward Peck, academic and Vice-Chancellor Nottingham Trent University
- Alan Cocks, professional footballer
