= Kerrin =

Kerrin is both a given name and a surname. Notable people with the name include:

== Given name ==
- Kerrin Harrison (born 1964), New Zealand badminton player
- Kerrin Hayes (born 1951), Australian rules footballer
- Kerrin Lee-Gartner (born 1966), Canadian alpine skier
- Kerrin Leoni (born 1979 or 1980), New Zealand politician
- Kerrin McEvoy (born 1980), Australian jockey
- Kerrin Petty (born 1970), American-Swedish cross-country skier
- Kerrin Vautier, New Zealand economist

== Surname ==
- Jessica Scott Kerrin, Canadian writer
- Richard Kerrin (1898–1988), Scottish Anglican dean

== See also ==
- Kerrins
