= Richard Kerrin =

Scottish Episcopal Dean (1898–1988)

Richard Elual Kerrin (4 July 1898 – 4 November 1988) was Dean of Aberdeen and Orkney from 1956 to 1969.

== Biography ==
The son of a clergyman, he was educated at Robert Gordon's College and the University of Aberdeen. After wartime service with the Artists' Rifles he was ordained in 1923. Following a curacy at Old Saint Paul's, Edinburgh he held Incumbencies at Inverurie, Stirling and Fraserburgh. He then served as Rector of St John's Aberdeen from 1954 to 1969 during which he was appointed as Dean of the Diocese between 1954 and 1969. After retirement from the full-time ministry, he served at Alford until ill-health forced him to retire permanently.

== Notes ==
Religious titles
Preceded by Frederick Easson	Dean of Aberdeen and Orkney; 1956–1969	Succeeded by Ian Begg
