= William Walker (priest) =

William Walker was Dean of Aberdeen and Orkney from 1896 to 1906.

He was born into a farming family in the Garioch and educated at Aberdeen Grammar School and the city's university. After a curacy at St Andrew, Aberdeen he was Rector of Monymusk from 1844 to 1900. He died on 11 March 1911.

== Notes ==
Religious titles
Preceded by William Webster	Dean of Aberdeen and Orkney; 1896–1906	Succeeded by James Myers Danson
