= Ian Begg =

Ian or Iain Begg may refer to:

- Iain Begg, British economist
- Ian Begg (bishop) (1911–1989), Scottish Episcopalian prelate
- Ian Begg (architect) (1925–2017), Scottish architect

== See also ==
- Ian Bagg, Canadian comedian, actor and writer
- Ean Begg, Jungian analyst, writer, translator and broadcaster
