= Ninian Comper =

British architect (1864–1960)

Sir Ninian Comper
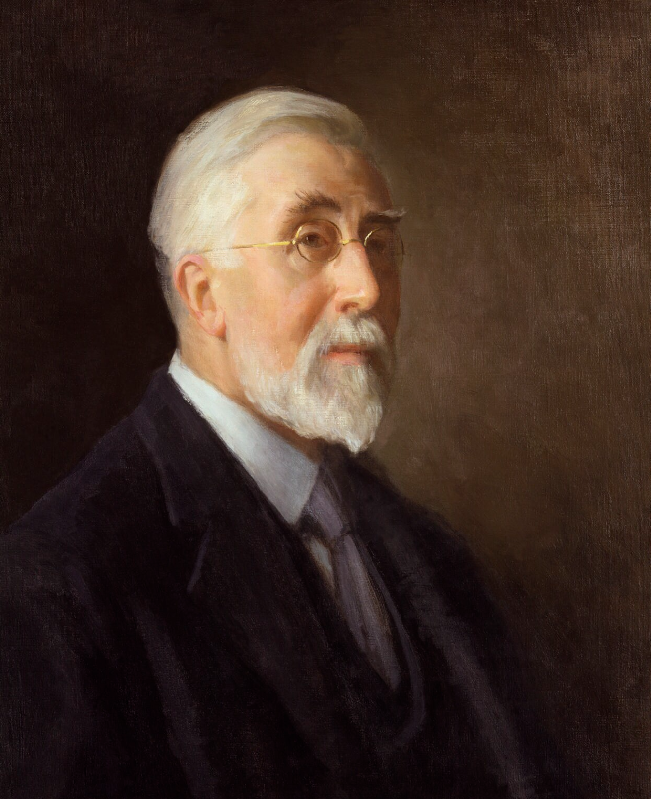
- Comper by Beatrice Bright (1930s)
- Born: John Ninian Comper; 10 June 1864; Aberdeen, Scotland
- Died: 22 December 1960 (aged 96); Clapham, London, England
- Occupation: Architect
- Spouse: Grace Bucknall
- Children: Nicholas Comper, John-Baptiste Sebastian Comper, Adrian Comper
- Parent(s): John Comper and Ellen (Taylor) Comper
- Practice: Bucknall & Comper

Sir John Ninian Comper (10 June 1864 – 22 December 1960) was a Scottish-born architect, one of the last of the great Gothic Revival architects.

His work almost entirely focused on the design, restoration and embellishment of churches, and the design of ecclesiastical furnishings, stained glass and vestments. He is celebrated for his use of colour, iconography and emphasis on churches as a setting for liturgy. In his later works, he developed the subtle integration of Classical and Gothic styles, an approach he described as 'unity by inclusion'.

== Early life ==
Comper was born in Aberdeen in 1864, the eldest son and fourth of the seven children of Ellen (née Taylor) and John Comper, Rector of St John's, Aberdeen (and later St Margaret of Scotland) in the Scottish Episcopal Church. The Comper family were of Norman origin and settled as yeoman farmers in Pulborough, Sussex at the Norman Conquest; nevertheless, Comper's father upheld a romantic notion that the family were descended from noble Huguenots.

Comper's father moved from Sussex to Scotland as a young man in search of work as a schoolmaster with a view to becoming a priest. His lack of a university degree prevented him from taking holy orders in the Church of England, so he was ordained as a priest in the Scottish Episcopal Church. John Comper became a significant figure within the Scottish Church, remembered for his ministry in the slums of Aberdeen and as an important figure in the northern High Church movement.

Comper was educated at Kingston College, Aberdeen, Glenalmond School in Perthshire and studied drawing for a year at the Ruskin School of Art in Oxford before moving to London to serve articles with Charles Eamer Kempe, and in 1883 to George Frederick Bodley and Thomas Garner. Fellow Scot William Bucknall took him into his London partnership in 1888.

== Personal life ==
Bucknall and Comper remained in partnership until 1905. Ninian married Grace Bucknall in 1890; they had six children. The eldest, John-Baptiste Sebastian Comper (1891–1979), became an architect, designing many churches for the Roman Catholic Diocese of Northampton. From 1912, Comper and his wife lived in London at The Priory, Beulah Hill, a house designed by Decimus Burton (1800–81), where he entertained friends such as John Betjeman. He had a studio nearby at Knights Hill, close to the cemetery at West Norwood. After the studio was destroyed in the Second World War, it was relocated to his garden, in a building previously used by his son, Nicholas Comper (1897–1939), to design aircraft.

== Career ==
After a number of restorations and embellishments of existing buildings, Comper's first completed commission for an entirely new church was St Cyprian's, Clarence Gate, London which sought to put into practice the precepts of the Alcuin Club, with whose liturgical views he remained closely identified. The warm reception afforded to St Cyprian's rapidly led to an increase in commissions. These included a range of windows in the north wall of the nave of Westminster Abbey; a baldacchino/ciborium, high altar and east window in memory of the dead of the Great War at St Peter's Church, Huddersfield; the Church of St Mary the Virgin, Wellingborough; St Michael & All Angels, Inverness; the Lady Chapel at Downside Abbey, Somerset; the ciborium and House Chapel extension for the Society of St John the Evangelist in Oxford (now St Stephen's House, Oxford); the Lady Chapel at St Matthew's, Westminster; the Lady Chapel and gilded paintings in the chancel of All Saints, Margaret Street;; a window in St Nicholas' Church, Bradfield, near Sheffield, which contains his customary strawberry in one corner; and St Martin's Chapel (1913) at Chailey Heritage School, with his son Sebastian. He also designed the main building for infants for St Mary & St John School on Hertford Street in Oxford, now the Comper Foundation Stage School. Comper also completely restored and partially redesigned the church at Church of St Giles, Wimborne St Giles, Dorset, which had suffered near total destruction following a fire in 1908.

In 2025, a parishioner through a visit to RIBA Library, discovered that one of Comper’s missing Gosport windows is that of the east window located at St Mary’s Catholic Church in Gosport High Street. The window was initially believed to be that of Gottfried Semper. But after viewing the five existing drawings, the parishioner confirmed that it is Comper’s. The only other window known to be designed by Comper in a Catholic Church is located in Downside Abbey.

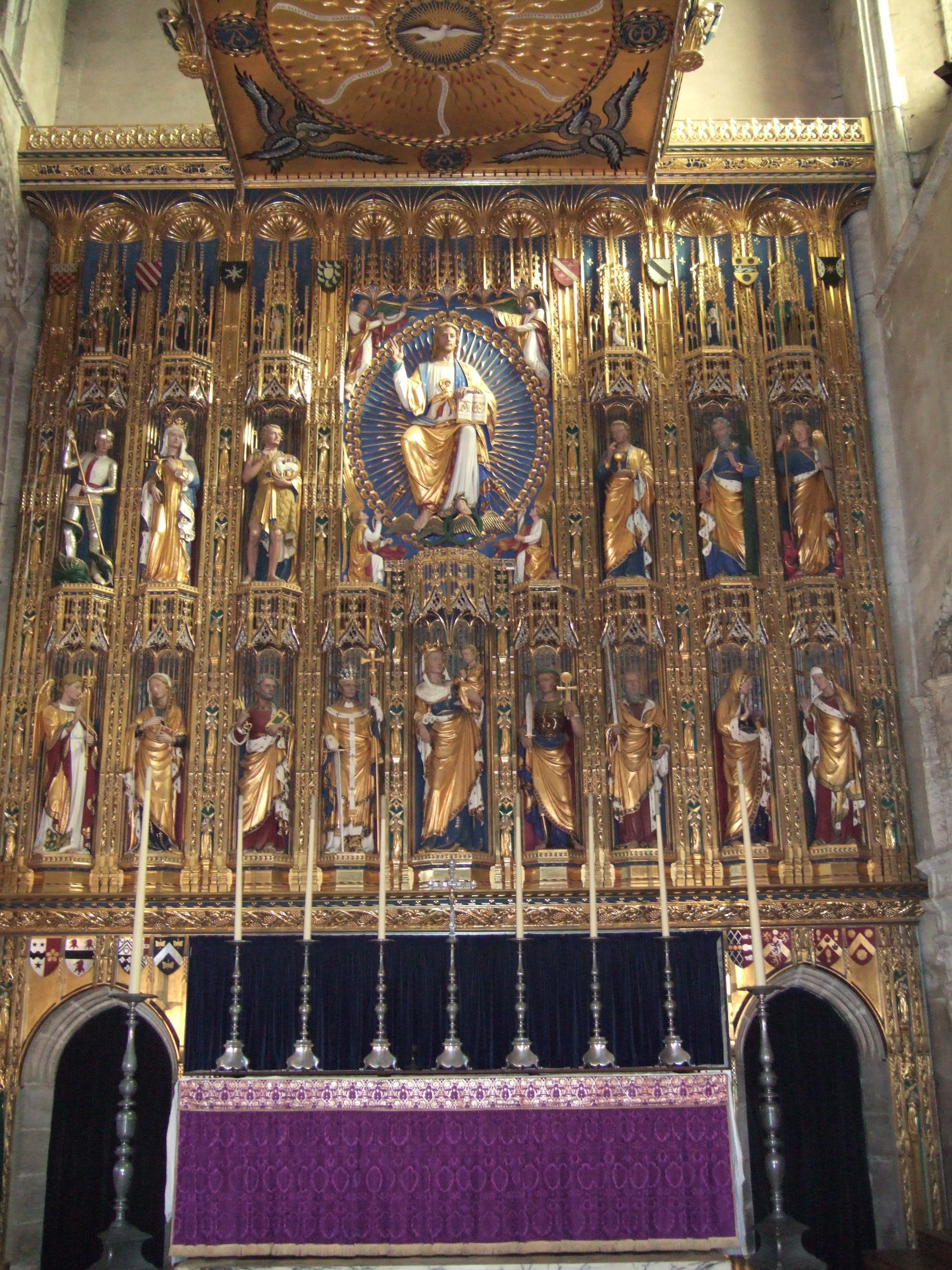
Reredos in Wymondham Abbey, designed by Comper

Comper is noted for continuing the tradition of designing altars in a medieval fashion, known as the 'English altar', which was first re-introduced by A. W. Pugin. An 'English altar' is an altar surrounded by riddel posts, from which riddel curtains hang, contemporary creations of which sometimes include a gradine (ledge), and despite its name, it is found in not just Medieval England, but other parts of Europe as well, including France and Italy. Comper designed a number of remarkable altar screens (reredos), inspired by medieval originals. Wymondham Abbey, Norfolk, has one example. He was capable of innovative planning; his Church of St Mary-in-the-Baum, Rochdale responds to a restricted urban site by placing the "sensationally high" nave on the well-lit southern side of the building, with the aisle on the north side.

After the First World War Comper designed the Welsh National War Memorial, unveiled in 1928 in Cathays Park, Cardiff. In 1936–38 he designed St Philip's Church at Cosham near Portsmouth, with a highly original plan with centralised altar; this appealled to the post-First World War generation New Churches Movement because of the primacy of the altar as the focus of the design, although by that date many architects and critics, such as Nikolaus Pevsner, saw his adherence to Gothic forms as dated and anachronistic.

Comper's only work in the United States was the Leslie Lindsey Chapel of Emmanuel Episcopal Church, Boston, comprising the decorative scheme for the chapel designed by Allen & Collens. Comper designed the altar, frontal, screen, and the stained glass windows. The chapel commemorates Leslie Lindsey and Stewart Mason, her husband of ten days, who were married at Emmanuel Church and perished when the Lusitania was torpedoed in 1915.

Comper was knighted by King George VI in 1950. On 22 December 1960, he died in The Hostel of God (now Royal Trinity Hospice) in Clapham. His body was brought back to Norwood for cremation at West Norwood Cemetery. His ashes were then interred beneath the windows he designed in Westminster Abbey.

== Sources ==
- Buckley, Leonard (1994). Sir Ninian Comper, 1864–1960 and Howard Martin Otto (Otho) Travers, 1886–1948: A Belated Tribute. Ecclesiological Society.
- Hammond, Peter (1960). Liturgy and Architecture. London.
- Hartwell, Clare; Hyde, Matthew; Pevsner, Nikolaus (2004) [1969]. Lancashire: Manchester and the South-East. The Buildings of England. New Haven, US and London: Yale University Press. ISBN 978-0-300-10583-4. OCLC 1023247427.
- Pevsner, Nikolaus (1952). London Except the Cities of London and Westminster. The Buildings of England. Harmondsworth, Middlesex: Penguin Books.
- —; Lloyd, David W. (1967). Hampshire and The Isle of Wight. The Buildings of England. New Haven, US and London: Yale University Press. ISBN 978-0-300-09606-4.
- —; Wilson, Bill (2002). Norfolk 2: North-West and South. The Buildings of England. New Haven, US and London: Yale University Press. ISBN 0-300-09657-7.
- Symondson, Anthony (1998a). "Unity by Inclusion: Sir Ninian Comper and the Planning of a Modern Church". In Roland Jeffrey (ed.). The Twentieth Century Church. London. ISBN 0-9529755-2-1.
- — (1988b). The Life and Work of Sir Ninian Comper 1864–1960: Catalogue for the Exhibition at the Royal Institute of British Architects, 20 January Until 27 February 1988. Royal Institute of British Architects.
- —; Bucknall, Stephen Arthur (2006). Sir Ninian Comper: An Introduction to His Life and Work, With Complete Gazetteer. Spire Books & the Ecclesiological Society. ISBN 978-1-904965-11-4.
