= Matthew (bishop of Aberdeen) =

Scottish churchman and bishop

Matthew (died 1199) was a 12th-century churchman residing in Scotland. He is the first man known to have held the position of Archdeacon of St Andrews, his first known ecclesiastical post. He occurs in this office in a document which can be dated to some point between August 1147 and June 1152. Bishop Edward, Bishop of Aberdeen, died in 1172 and Archdeacon Matthew was elected as the successor. He was consecrated on 2 April 1172.

Matthew was the principal prelate in charge of the consecration of John the Scot at Holyrood Abbey on 15 June 1180. Matthew maintained his links with Fife, appearing in numerous charters relating to that province. He had a brother named Odo who was the dapifer ("steward") of Ernald, Bishop of St Andrews (1160–63). His family may have been the one that eventually took the locative surname "de Kininmund" (or variants). He died on 20 August 1199 and was succeeded by John, the prior of Kelso Abbey.

Religious titles
Preceded by Uncertain	Archdeacon of St Andrews between 1147 and 1152–1172	Succeeded by Walter de Roxburgh
Preceded by Edward	Bishop of Aberdeen; 1172–1199	Succeeded by John
Legal offices
Preceded by Donnchad II, Earl of Fife	Justiciar of Scotia between 1172–1199 with Donnchad II, Earl of Fife (c. 1172–1199); Gille Brigte, Earl of Strathearn (c. 1172–1199)	Succeeded by Donnchad II, Earl of Fife
