= Adam de Kald =

13th-century Bishop of Aberdeen

Adam de Kald [de Kalder, Crail] was an early 13th-century Bishop of Aberdeen. His name, de Kald or de Caral, could refer to, among other places, Calder in Nairnshire or Crail in Fife. Either location may mark his origin place, but this is speculation. There is a river in West Yorkshire called Calder. His origins remain obscure.

He seems to have risen as a clerk of King William the Lion; he is styled clericus domini regis ("clerk of the lord King") as a witness to a charter of the latter king. In 1207, as a sub-deacon, he was elected Bishop of Aberdeen. According to Hector Boece, an often highly unreliable authority of a much later date, Adam was the choice of the king rather than the clergy of the diocese of Aberdeen. He was confirmed in his position only after a mandate of Pope Innocent III. The mandate was issued to the Bishop of Dunkeld, the Bishop of Brechin and the Abbot of Kelso, who were ordered to determine whether or not Adam was created sub-deacon merely in order to become bishop.

Not a lot is known about Adam's episcopate. He left at least three charters, including confirmations of grants made by Morggán, Mormaer of Mar and the latter's kinsman Thomas mac Maíl Choluim, Royal Doorward. There is a little evidence that he served as Chancellor at some point under King William. He died at some point in the year 1228. He was succeeded by Gilbert de Stirling.

Religious titles
Preceded by John	Bishop of Aberdeen; 1207–1228	Succeeded by Gilbert de Stirling
