= Ormskirk School =

English secondary school in West Lancashire

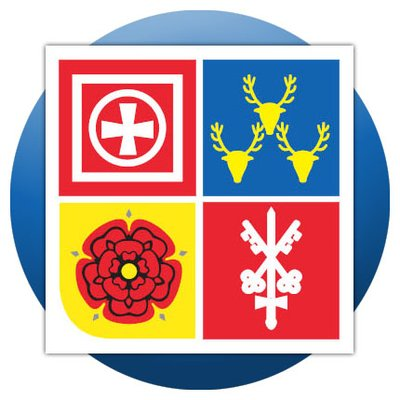

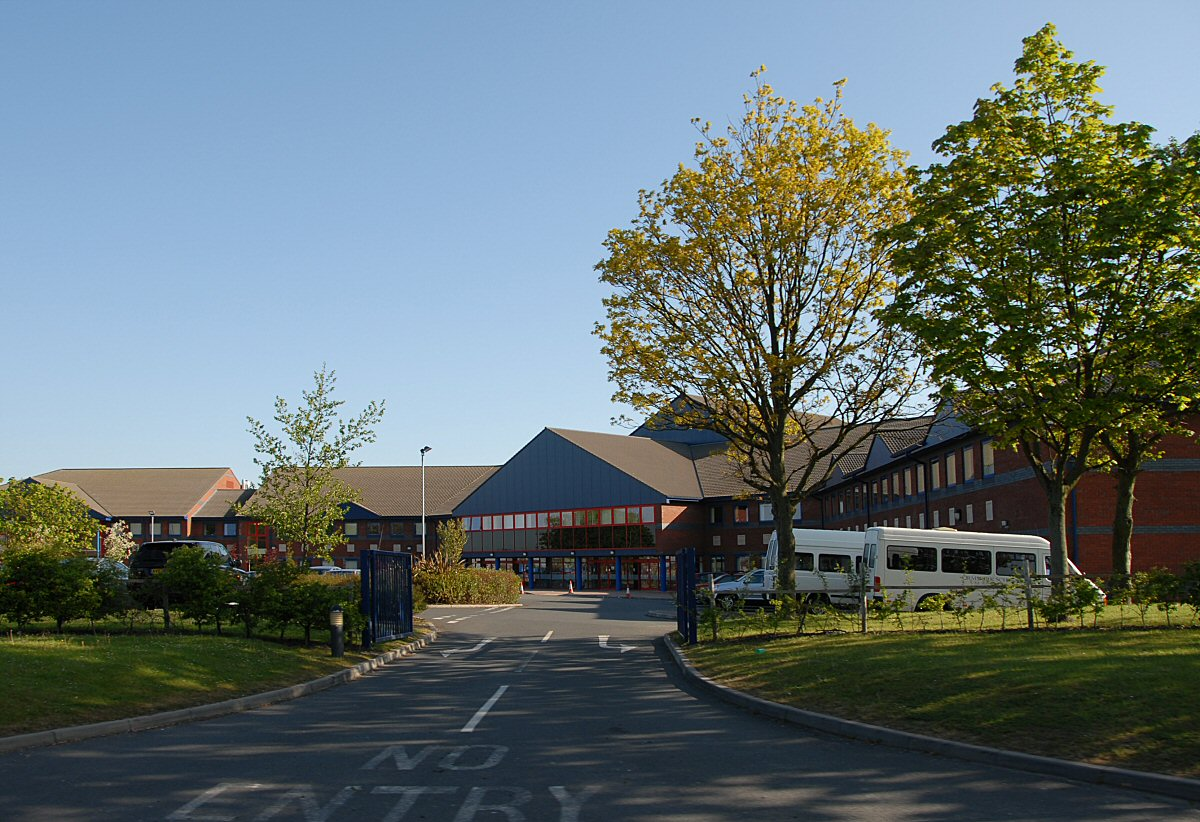

Location
- Wigan Road; Ormskirk, Lancashire, L39 2AT; England; 53.5679°N 2.8669°W

Information
- Type: Academy
- Established: September 2001
- Local authority: Lancashire
- Trust: Endeavour Learning Trust
- Department for Education URN: 148254 Tables
- Ofsted: Reports
- Headteacher: John Burnham
- Gender: Coeducational
- Age: 11 to 18
- Enrolment: 1,600
- Original Schools: Cross Hall High School and Ormskirk Grammar School
- Website: http://www.ormskirk.lancs.sch.uk/

Ormskirk School is a coeducational secondary school and sixth form located in Ormskirk in the English county of Lancashire.

The school caters to approximately 1,400 pupils, aged 11 to 18.

== History ==
Ormskirk school was formed in September 2001 through the merger of Cross Hall High School and Ormskirk Grammar School, with an investment of £900 million.

In September 2004, the school relocated to a new facility on Wigan Road which was officially opened by Andrew Mountbatten-Windsor on 18 October 2005.

Until 2011, students at Omskirk School, formerly a Specialist Arts College, were required to take an art course as a GCSE.

The school switched to academy status in April 2022, after previously being managed by Lancashire County Council as a voluntary controlled school. The school is now sponsored by the Endeavour Learning Trust.

The school's headteacher is John Burnham, the brother of UK Prime Minister Andy Burnham.
