= Gerald Stranraer-Mull =

Scottish Anglican priest

Gerald Hugh Stranraer-Mull (born 1942) is a retired Anglican priest who was Dean of St Andrew's Cathedral, Aberdeen from 1988 to 2008.

Stranraer-Mull was educated at Woodhouse Grove School, King's College London and St Augustine's College, Canterbury and ordained in 1971. After a curacy in Hexham he served at Ellon, Corbridge and Cruden Bay.

Anglican Communion titles
Preceded by Denis Bovey	Dean of Aberdeen and Orkney; 1988–2008	Succeeded by Emsley Nimmo
