= Randal MacAlister =

Randal George Leslie MacAlister was an eminent Anglican priest in the last quarter of the 20th century and the early part of the 21st.

He was born on 31 December 1941 and educated at The Royal School, Armagh and Trinity College, Dublin. Ordained in 1966, his career began with a curacy at St Mark's Portadown after which he was Rector of St John’s Greenock, then of St John's Forfar. Next he was Chaplain of St Mark's Sophia Antipolis in France before his appointment as Dean of St Andrews, Dunkeld and Dunblane. A keen student of the Gaelic language, he retired in 2006 He died in Corthachy, Angus on 19 June 2009.

Anglican Communion titles
Preceded by Alfred Watt	Dean of St Andrews, Dunkeld and Dunblane; 1998–2006	Succeeded by Bob Gillies
