= Kenny Rathband =

Dean Of St Andrews

Kenneth William (Kenny) Rathband (born 1960) is the former Dean of St Andrews, Dunkeld and Dunblane in the Scottish Episcopal Church.

He was educated at the University of Edinburgh and Edinburgh Theological College;and ordained deacon in 1986, and priest in 1987. After a curacy at St Paul's Cathedral, Dundee he was Team Vicar at St Martin's in the city until 1989, and then at St Philips and St James’, Edinburgh until 1991. He has been Rector of St Ninian's, Alyth, with St Catherine's, Blairgowrie, and St Anne's, Coupar since 1991 In 2018 Kenny moved to take up the charge as Rector of Holy Trinity Dunfermline and St Margaret’s Rosyth.

He retired from full time ministry on 31 August 2021 following a period of ill health.

Anglican Communion titles
Preceded by Bob Gillies	Dean of St Andrews, Dunkeld and Dunblane; 2007 – 2021	Succeeded by Graham Taylor
