= Walter Herok =

Walter Herok [Herot] was a cleric from 13th century and 14th century Scotland. He served as Dean of Moray from 1296 or before until 1329. In that year, after the death of Henry le Chen, he was elected Bishop of Aberdeen. Walter travelled to Avignon to receive consecration from Pope John XXII, but died there, apparently before receiving consecration. Alexander de Kininmund became bishop instead.

Religious titles
Preceded by Henry le Chen	Bishop of Aberdeen; 1329 (bishop-elect)	Succeeded by Alexander de Kininmund
