= John P. Marshall =

British businessman (born 1978)

- Born: 21 July 1978 (age 48); Liverpool, United Kingdom
- Occupation: Businessman

John P. Marshall (born 21 July 1978) is a British businessman who has been living in Hungary since 2006. Marshall is Owner and chairman of Aspire Group and Associates Ltd.

== Early life ==
Born in Liverpool, Marshall grew up in Aughton, a village approximately 12 miles from the centre of the city. His parents, Peter (originally from Bishop Auckland, Durham) and Daniela(a Czech national who came to the United Kingdom in 1972 at the age of 22) married in 1973. Marshall is the second of four children: two boys and two girls.

Marshall attended Town Green School until the age of 11, after which he studied at Ormskirk Grammar School, then Ormskirk College until he turned 18 and moved to Aigburth, central Liverpool. This was when he started his working life as a door-to-door salesman.

== Business career ==
He worked for a joint venture company of Calor Gas and Texaco 'Calortex' where his role was to build a team of sales representatives. In 2001, he joined Olan Mills Portrait Studios where he was responsible for over 80 studios nationwide throughout the UK. In 2003, he founded his first company, Tech Asia Recruitment Consultancy that was created to assist, find and place post-graduate students as English teachers in schools throughout South Korea. In 2004, he was appointed Sales Director of Homes Deluxe Ltd, that is a prestige Real Estate agency based in Marbella, specialised in exclusive, super deluxe homes. He moved to Budapest in 2006, and became the Development Director of Crown Global Ltd. He was involved in the initial architectural planning of The Gardens Budapest. In 2009, he founded Aspire Group & Associates Ltd that is represented in areas like real estate development, smartphone software development and sports investment. Aspire Group & Associates have bought a 100% shareholding in Vác Football Club Ltd in July 2012. Marshall is also an associate member of the British Chamber of Commerce in Hungary.

== Football investments ==
=== Vác FC ===
Aspire GA, owned by Marshall, started negotiations of buying Vác FC in April 2012. Following the full scale audit and legal debates Marshall's company became 100% owner of the Vác club in October 2012.

In the next months the financial and legal situation of Vác FC became more complicated as the previous owner József Héger debated Marshall's proprietary rights. Despite the ingravescent situation, the local government and the football players were committed to the British investor.

As the situation between the previous club owner and Marshall did not show any sign of consolidation after the winter break, the Vác government decided to revoke the rights of usage of the town-owned stadium. Following this step the football players, who did not receive their salary for months, called a strike. In this chaotic situation the Hungarian Football Federation started monitoring the legitimate operation of the club. As a result of this procedure the Federation revoked the club licence on 26 March 2013, not much later the club was disqualified from Nemzeti Bajnokság II.

At the end Vác acquired the right to participate in the Pest County I. local division, so "the club that has legendary past and an enviable youth program can be taken in hand by the British owner with a clean slate".

During the summer of 2013 Marshall signed up János Csank as head coach, who undertook the role due to his past with the club. "This club has a special place in my heart, I feel it's almost a duty to come back and help."

Marshall provided a HUF 40 million budget for Vác FC in the 2013–14 season in order that they could get into NBIII for the next season.

On 29 July 2019, he left Vác FC as his British-owned shares were transferred to Vác VLSE, which became the club's sole owner.

=== Egri FC ===
In February 2013 according to the advice of his consultants Marshall bought 75% ownership of Egri FC as the previous owner did not want to finance the club further. Though the incurring costs were higher than expected, Marshall started to consolidate Egri FC with paying the players arrears of salary and starting to build the lighting system of the stadium. In April 2013 in spite all these efforts the local government announced that they would not sponsor the operations of Egri FC any more. As a result of this move Marshall decided to sell his part in the club. Since the end of May 2013 the new owner of Egri FC is Sándor Kósa.
