= Arthur Ranken =

Scottish clergyman (1806–1886)

Arthur Ranken (23 October 1806 – 24 September 1886) was Dean of Aberdeen and Orkney from 1880 to 1886.

He was born at Tyrie, Aberdeenshire in 1806, and educated at Marischal College and the University of Aberdeen and ordained in 1829. After a curacy at Portsoy he was the incumbent at Mintlaw and then at Old Deer until his death, holding the appointment as Dean in addition for the last six years of his life.

He died on 24 September 1886.

== Notes ==
Religious titles
Preceded by David Wilson	Dean of Aberdeen and Orkney; 1880–1886	Succeeded by Alexander Harvey
