= Gilbert de Stirling =

Scottish bishop

Gilbert de Stirling was an early 13th-century bishop of Scotland. His background is unclear, perhaps coming from a burgess family of Stirling; he emerges in 1228 as the newly elected Bishop of Aberdeen, succeeding the recently deceased Adam de Kalder, after Matthew the Scot had turned down his own election in order to become Bishop of Dunkeld.

Most of the knowledge historians have about Bishop Gilbert's episcopate relates to various legal agreements made with other religious institutions, including confirmations of grants made to St Andrews Cathedral Priory and the Céli Dé of Monymusk, the latter made by Donnchadh, Earl of Mar. He also settled a dispute with the Bishop of Moray regarding certain rights in boundary churches.

He died at Aberdeen in 1239.

Religious titles
Preceded by Matthew the Scot	Bishop of Aberdeen; 1228–1239	Succeeded by Radulf de Lamley
