= Emsley Nimmo =

Scottish Anglican priest and historian

The Very Reverend Canon Emsley Nimmo FSA Scot
- Dean of Aberdeen and Orkney
- Church: Scottish Episcopal Church
- Diocese: Diocese of Aberdeen and Orkney
- In office: April 2008 to November 2017
- Predecessor: Gerald Stranraer-Mull
- Successor: Dennis Berk

Orders
- Ordination: 1978 (deacon); 1979 (priest) by George Sessford

Personal details
- Born: Alexander Emsley Nimmo; 28 February 1953 (age 73) Glasgow, Scotland
- Denomination: Anglicanism

Alexander Emsley Nimmo, FSA Scot (born 28 February 1953) is a Scottish Anglican priest and historian. He has been Rector of St Margaret of Scotland, Aberdeen since 1990. He was also Dean of the Diocese of Aberdeen and Orkney from 2008 to 2017.

== Early life and education ==
Nimmo was born on 28 February 1953 in Glasgow, Scotland. He studied divinity at the University of Aberdeen, graduating with a Bachelor of Divinity (BD) degree in 1976. From 1976 to 1978, he trained for Holy Orders at Edinburgh Theological College.

Nimmo has continued his academic studies following ordination. He studied at the University of Edinburgh, graduating with a Master of Philosophy (MPhil) degree in 1983. His master's thesis was titled "Charles Wordsworth, Bishop of St. Andrews 1853–1892: reconciler or controversialist?". He undertook postgraduate research at the University of Aberdeen, completing his Doctor of Philosophy (PhD) in 1997. His doctoral thesis was titled "Bishop John Skinner and the resurgence of Scots Episcopacy".

== Ordained ministry ==
Nimmo was ordained in the Scottish Episcopal Church (SEC) as a deacon in 1978 and as a priest in 1979 during services at Inverness Cathedral by George Sessford. For his curacy, he served as Precentor of Inverness Cathedral between 1978 and 1981. He then joined St Peter's Church, Stornoway, Isle of Lewis in the Diocese of Argyll and the Isles: he served as priest in charge from 1981 to 1983, and as rector in 1984. He then moved to the Diocese of Edinburgh to become rector of St Michael and All Saints, Edinburgh. He was additionally a chaplain at HM Prison Edinburgh, between 1987 and 1990.

In 1990, Nimmo moved to the Diocese of Aberdeen and Orkney to become rector of St Margaret of Scotland, Aberdeen. He has also been chaplain of His Majesty's Theatre, Aberdeen since 1990 and was Episcopal visiting chaplain to HM Prison Peterhead from 2004 to 2007. He was made a Canon of St Andrew's Cathedral, Aberdeen in 1996 and an honorary canon of Christ Church Cathedral, Hartford, Connecticut, United States. On 21 April 2008, he was installed as Dean of the Diocese of Aberdeen and Orkney: he held this appointment in addition to his parish and other ministries. He resigned as dean in November 2017; this followed the appointment of Anne Dyer, who supports same-sex marriage, as the next Bishop of Aberdeen and Orkney and the first female bishop in the SEC.

== Honours ==
In 1993, Nimmo was elected a Fellow of the Society of Antiquaries of Scotland (FSA Scot). During the period 2011–2012, he served as Chairman of the 1745 Association.

== Selected works ==
- Nimmo, Alexander Emsley (2014). "Liturgy: The Sacramental Soul of Jacobitism". In Macinnes, Allan I.; German, Kieran; Graham, Lesley (eds.). Living with Jacobitism 1690–1788. Taylor & Francis. ISBN 978-1317318125.
