= David Wilson (dean of Aberdeen and Orkney) =

Scottish priest

David Wilson (1805–1880), who was the incumbent at Fyvie, was the inaugural Dean of the new Diocese of Aberdeen and Orkney, serving from 1865 to 1880.

Religious titles
New title	Dean of Aberdeen and Orkney; 1865–1880	Succeeded by Arthur Ranken
