= George Bartlet =

Scottish Episcopal dean

George Bartlet (13 November 1866 – 13 February 1951) was a Scottish clergyman who was dean of Aberdeen and Orkney from 1934 to 1948.

Bartlet was born in 1866 in Forgue, Aberdeenshire, to George Bartlet and his wife, Isabella Cruickshank. He was educated at King's College, Aberdeen, graduating in 1893, and ordained in 1894. After curacies in Ayr and Glasgow, he held incumbencies in Forgue, Folla Rule, and Aberdeen prior to being elevated to canon in 1924, a decade before his appointment as dean. In 1942, he became rector of Kincardine O'Neil, and retired six years later.

== Personal life ==
He had a wife, Ethel Murray, with whom he had two sons and a daughter. He died in Edinburgh in 1951.

Religious titles
Preceded by Robert Mackay	Dean of Aberdeen and Orkney; 1934–1948	Succeeded by John Wattie
