= Kerrins =

Kerrins is a surname. Notable people with the surname include:

- Pat Kerrins (born 1936), English footballer
- Wayne Kerrins (born 1965), English footballer

== See also ==
- Kerrin
