= Alexander Harper (priest) =

Scottish Episcopal Dean

Alexander Harper (1818–1887) was Dean of Aberdeen and Orkney from 1886 to 1887.

He was educated at the University of Aberdeen and ordained in 1842. After a curacy at Pittenweem he was the incumbent at Inverurie until his appointment as Dean.

He died in March 1887.

== Notes ==
Religious titles
| Preceded by Arthur Ranken | Dean of Aberdeen and Orkney; 1886–1887 | Succeeded by William Webster |
