= Denis Bovey =

British priest (1929–2023)

Denis Philip Bovey (2 December 1929 – 13 March 2023) was Provost of St Andrew's Cathedral, Aberdeen, from 1983 to 2008.

Bovey was educated at Ely Theological College and ordained in 1954. After curacies in Southwick, Sunderland and West Hartlepool, he served in Strichen, Old Deer, Longside and Inverurie. Bovey died on 13 March 2023, at the age of 93.

Anglican Communion titles
Preceded by Alexander Adamson	Dean of Aberdeen and Orkney; 1983–1988	Succeeded by Gerald Stranraer-Mull
