= William Webster (dean of Aberdeen and Orkney) =

William Webster (12 November 1810 – 10 April 1896) was Dean of Aberdeen and Orkney from 1887 to 1896. He was educated at the University of Aberdeen and ordained in 1835. After a curacy at Drumlithie he was the incumbent at New Pitsligo until his appointment as Dean.

Religious titles
Preceded by Alexander Harper	Dean of Aberdeen and Orkney; 1887–1896	Succeeded by William Walker
