= St Margaret of Scotland, Aberdeen =

Coordinates: 57.1514°N 2.0976°W

St Margaret's, Gallowgate
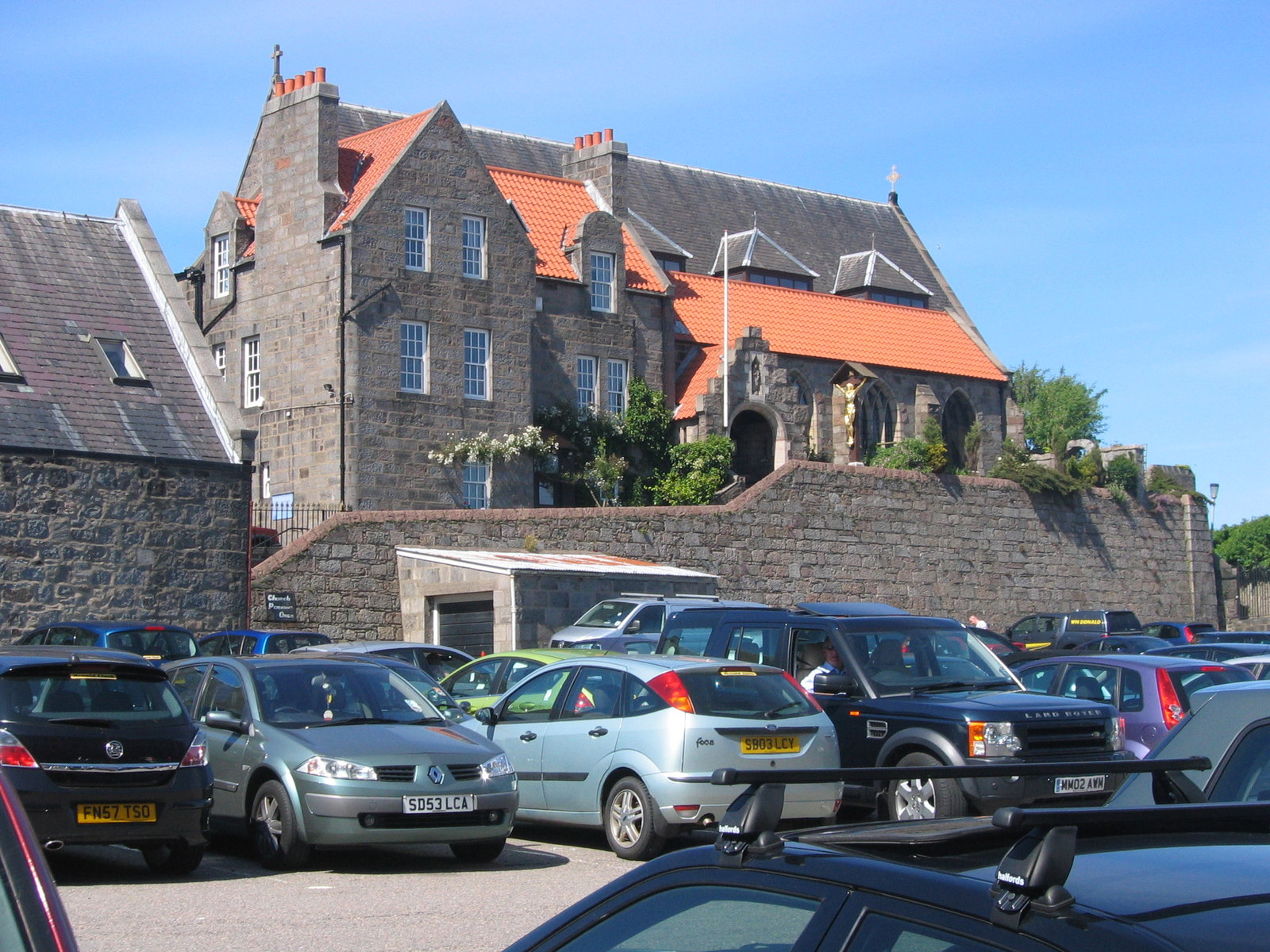
- St Margaret's, Gallowgate
- Address: Gallowgate, Aberdeen, AB25 1EA
- Country: Scotland
- Language: English
- Denomination: Scottish Episcopal Church
- Churchmanship: Anglo-Catholic
- Website: https://stmargaretsgallowgate.org.uk/

History
- Dedication: St Margaret of Scotland

Administration
- Diocese: Aberdeen & Orkney

Clergy
- Rector: The Very Rev Canon Dr A Emsley Nimmo

St Margaret of Scotland, also known as St Margaret's, Gallowgate, is a Scottish Episcopal Church, in Aberdeen, Scotland.

== History ==
The Gallowgate was one of the poorer areas of Aberdeen and in the mid-19th century consisted of a large area of slums. St Margaret's was founded in 1867 as a mission church by Father John Comper, one of the first followers in Scotland of the Oxford Movement. Comper was at the time rector of St John's, Aberdeen's oldest Anglican congregation. Comper felt that the poorer areas of Aberdeen were not being reached by the Church and felt obliged to respond, firstly in 1863 by founding a convent of the Society of Saint Margaret on the Spital and then the Gallowgate church.

The original church was a room rented by Comper on the Gallowgate. By 1870, a joint chapel-school had been consecrated and Comper had resigned from his post at St John's and become full-time priest to the newly formed St Margaret's parish. The church lies on a high, prominent site above the city of Aberdeen. The architect was James Matthews (1819–98). In 1879, a separate school was built, followed by the St Nicholas chapel and the rectory in 1898 and 1906 respectively, designed by Comper's son, Ninian Comper. A separate church hall was built in 1908 by the architect George Irvine, and in the same year, Ninian Comper installed the aisle and oak screen.

There are a variety of stained-glass windows, depicting a number of liturgical themes. Some of these windows were also designed by Ninian Comper. The window on the North wall of the St Nicholas Chapel is dedicated to the Sea Cadets, with the arms of the Diocese of Aberdeen and Orkney and of the City of Aberdeen. The text, "the sea is thy mirror" is from the poem L'Homme et la mer (Man and the Sea) by French poet, Charles Baudelaire, and "deep calleth unto deep" is from Psalm 42:7. The ichthus in the centre is a Greek anagram "Jesus Christ, God, Son, Saviour".

The church is now listed as Category B by Historic Environment Scotland.

== Worship ==
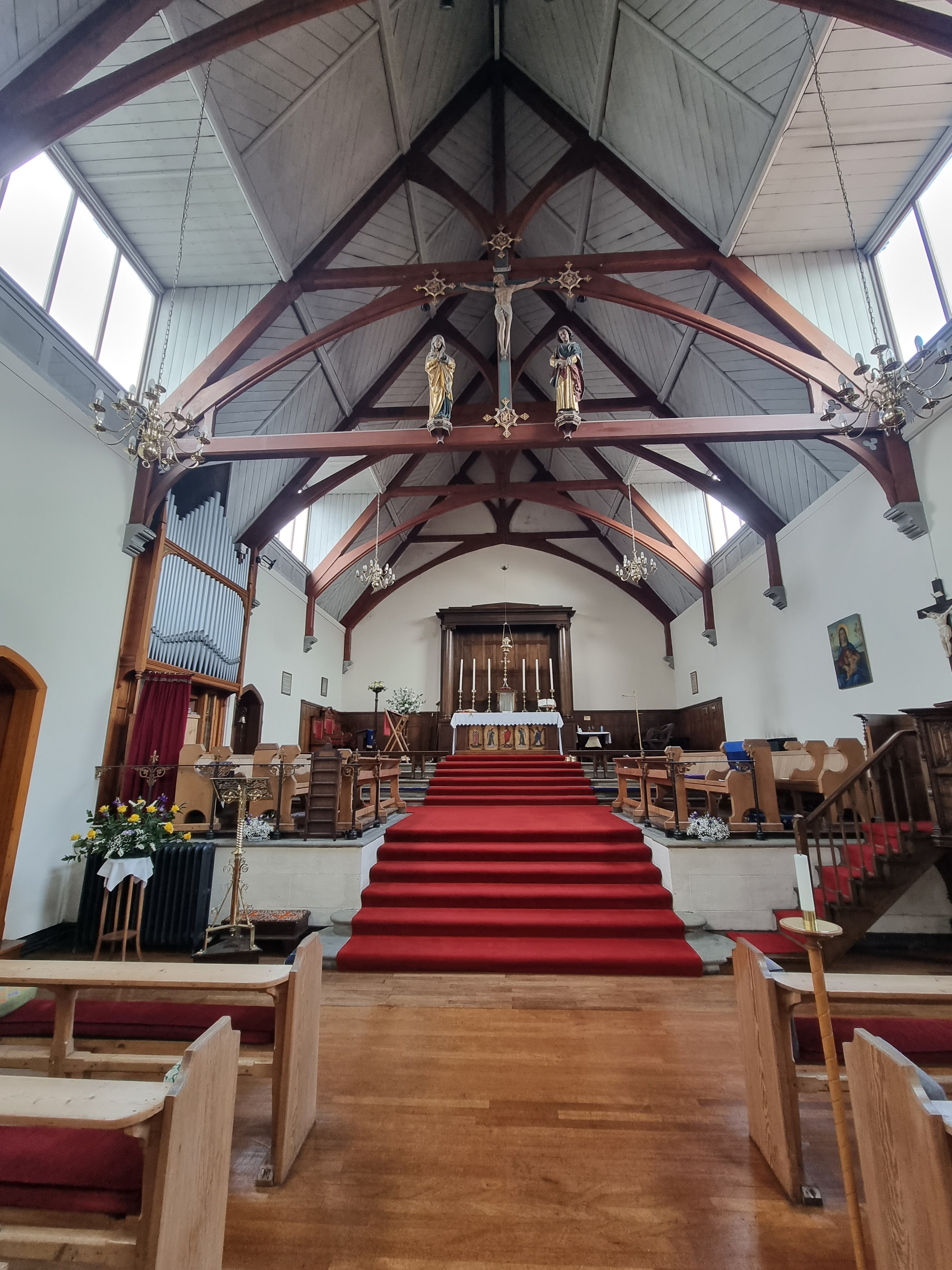
The chancel

Worship at St Margaret's is in the Anglo-Catholic, "High church", tradition.

Each Sunday, there is Parish Mass at 10:30am. There is also a Low Mass at 8am and 10am on Tuesday mornings. St Margaret's is one of few Scottish Episcopal congregations which has regular Gaelic Mass, having it on the first Saturday of the month at midday.
