= Arthur Douglas (bishop) =

Scottish bishop

The Right Reverend Arthur Douglas
- Bishop of Aberdeen and Orkney
- Church: Scottish Episcopal Church
- Diocese: Aberdeen and Orkney
- Elected: 1883
- In office: 1883–1905
- Predecessor: Thomas Suther
- Successor: Rowland Ellis

Orders
- Ordination: 1850
- Consecration: 1883

Personal details
- Born: 5 January 1827
- Died: 19 July 1905 (aged 78)
- Buried: St Mary's Church, Dalmahoy
- Denomination: Anglican
- Parents: George Sholto Douglas & Frances Theodora Rose
- Spouse: Anna Maria Harriet
- Children: 9
- Education: Durham University

The Hon. Arthur Gascoigne Douglas D.C.L. (5 January 1827– 19 July 1905) was Bishop of Aberdeen and Orkney in Scotland from 1883 to 1905.

== Biography ==
Douglas studied for his licentiate in theology at Durham University, completing his final examinations in Easter term 1850. He was a member of Hatfield College. He served as a priest in Kidderminster, Southwark, Scaldwell and Shawick before he was elected Bishop of Aberdeen in 1883.

He was the fifth son of George Sholto Douglas, 17th earl of Morton. He married, 17 April 1855, Anna Maria Harriet, youngest daughter of Richards Richards of Caerynch, co. Merioneth. By her, he had 3 sons and 6 daughters. He was a participant in the consecration of St Mary's Church, Dalmahoy in 1850, where he was subsequently buried in 1905.

Anglican Communion titles
Preceded by Thomas George Suther	Bishop of Aberdeen and Orkney; 1883–1905	Succeeded by Rowland Ellis
