= Anthony Mitchell (bishop) =

Scottish bishop

The Right Reverend Anthony Mitchell DD
- Bishop of Aberdeen and Orkney
- Church: Scottish Episcopal Church
- Diocese: Aberdeen and Orkney
- Elected: 1912
- In office: 1912-1917
- Predecessor: Rowland Ellis
- Successor: Frederic Deane

Orders
- Ordination: 1892
- Consecration: 1912

Personal details
- Born: 24 October 1868 Aberdeen, Scotland
- Died: 17 January 1917 (aged 48) Aberdeen, Scotland
- Buried: Allenvale Cemetery, Aberdeen
- Denomination: Anglican
- Parents: John Mitchell

Anthony Mitchell (24 October 1868- 17 January 1917) was bishop of Aberdeen and Orkney from 1912 to 1917.

== Biography ==
He was ordained in 1892, after studying at the University of Aberdeen, Gonville and Caius College, Cambridge, the University of Edinburgh, and the Episcopal Theological College. In 1905 he became canon of St. Mary's Cathedral, Edinburgh, and was appointed Bishop of Aberdeen and Orkney in 1912, a post he held until his death. In addition to his clerical work, he was a respected ecclesiastical historian.

Anglican Communion titles
Preceded by Rowland Ellis	Bishop of Aberdeen and Orkney; 1912–1917	Succeeded by Frederic Deane
