= Robert Mackay (priest) =

Irish priest and Dean of Diocese of Aberdeen and Orkney

Robert Mackay was Dean of Aberdeen and Orkney from 1922 to 1934.

He was educated at the University of Aberdeen and ordained in 1883. After a curacy at Edinburgh Cathedral he was Rector of Longside from 1845. During World War I he was a Chaplain to the Forces. He was the Synod Clerk for the Diocese of Aberdeen and Orkney from 1910 to 1922; and a Canon of Aberdeen Cathedral from 1914 to 1922.

== Notes ==
Religious titles
Preceded by James Wiseman	Dean of Aberdeen and Orkney; 1922–1934	Succeeded by George Bartlet
