= James Wiseman (cricketer) =

English cricketer, British Army officer (1816–1839)

Personal information
- Full name: James Mackintosh Wiseman
- Born: 13 February 1816; Hastings, Sussex, England
- Died: 19 July 1839 (aged 23); Sindh, British India
- Batting: Unknown

Domestic team information
- Years: Team
- 1836: Oxford University

Career statistics
Competition	First-class
Matches	1
Runs scored	1
Batting average	0.50
100s/50s	–/–
Top score	1
Catches/stumpings	–/–
- Source: Cricinfo, 1 June 2020

James Mackintosh Wiseman (13 February 1816 – 19 July 1839) was an English first-class cricketer and British Army officer.

The son of Sir William Saltonstall Wiseman, he was born at Hastings in February 1816. He later studied at University College at the University of Oxford. While studying at Oxford, he made a single appearances in first-class cricket for Oxford University against the Marylebone Cricket Club at Oxford in 1836. Batting twice in the match, he was dismissed for a single run in the Oxford first innings by John Bayley, while in their second innings he was run out without scoring.

After graduating from Oxford, Wiseman served in British India as an ensign with the Bombay Army. He was killed in the Sindh in July 1839.
