= Myers Danson =

James Myers Danson (1845 in Carnforth – 1909 in Aberdeen) was Dean of Aberdeen and Orkney from 1907 to 1909.

He was educated at Ingleton School and Trinity College, Dublin and ordained deacon in 1871 and priest in 1873. His first post was as Assistant Chaplain of St. Mark's College, Chelsea. He was appointed the incumbent at St. Mary, Aberdeen in 1874; of St Mary, Arbroath in 1880; and of St. Andrew, Aberdeen in 1882, where he stayed until his death on 29 December 1909.

== Notes ==
Religious titles
Preceded by Henry Ley Greaves	Provost of St Andrew's Cathedral, Aberdeen; 1882–1909	Succeeded by William Perry
Preceded by William Walker	Dean of Aberdeen and Orkney; 1907–1909	Succeeded by James Wiseman

#
