= Bruce Cameron (bishop) =

Scottish Anglican bishop

The Right Reverend Bruce Cameron
- Bishop of Aberdeen and Orkney; Primus of the Scottish Episcopal Church
- Church: Scottish Episcopal Church
- Diocese: Aberdeen and Orkney
- In office: 1992-2006
- Predecessor: Frederick Charles Darwent
- Successor: Robert Gillies
- Other post: Primus of the Scottish Episcopal Church (2000-2006)

Orders
- Ordination: 1964 (Deacon); 1965 (Priest)
- Consecration: 19 June 1992

Personal details
- Born: Andrew Bruce Cameron; 2 May 1941 (age 85) Glasgow, Scotland
- Denomination: Anglicanism
- Parents: Andrew Macintyre Cameron & Helen Adam McKechnie
- Spouse: Elaine Gingles
- Children: 2 sons

Andrew Bruce Cameron (born 2 May 1941) is a Scottish Anglican bishop who served as the Bishop of Aberdeen and Orkney and the Primus of the Scottish Episcopal Church.

Cameron was born on 2 May 1941 in Glasgow, Scotland. He is the son of Andrew Macintyre Cameron and Helen Adam McKechnie. His brother, Douglas Maclean Cameron, was the Bishop of Argyll and the Isles from 1993 to 2003

Cameron was educated at Edinburgh Theological College between 1961 and 1964. After graduation, he was ordained a deacon in 1964 and a priest in 1965. He first served as curate at St Michael's and All Angels' Church, Helensburgh in Argyll and Bute, from 1964 to 1967. He was then posted to another curacy at Holy Cross Church, Edinburgh from 1967 to 1970

Cameron's quick advance in the church led him to become chaplain at St Mary's Cathedral, Edinburgh from 1971 to 1975. During this period he was the diocesan and provincial youth chaplain. Between 1975 and 1982, he was rector of St Mary's Church in Dalmahoy, followed by Team Minister in Livingston from 1982 to 1988 and then the rector of St John's Church in Perth from 1988 to 1992.

On 19 June 1992, he was consecrated Bishop of Aberdeen and Orkney at St. Andrew's Cathedral, Aberdeen. He was elected Primus on 1 November 2000.

At the meeting of the Primates of the Anglican Communion in February 2005, Cameron presented a summary of the worldwide responses to the Windsor Report on preserving the communion in the face of differences of opinion on sexuality.

Cameron stepped down as Primus in April 2006 and retired as Bishop of Aberdeen and Orkney at the end of June 2006 (as he reached the clerical retirement age of 65). He is married to Elaine (née Gingles) and they have two sons. Following his retirement, he served as an assistant bishop in the Episcopal Diocese of Southern Virginia of the Episcopal Church in the United States of America for several months in 2008.

Anglican Communion titles
Preceded by Frederick Darwent	Bishop of Aberdeen and Orkney; 1992–2006	Succeeded by Robert (Bob) Gillies
Preceded by Richard Holloway	Primus of the Scottish Episcopal Church; 2000–2006	Succeeded by Idris Jones
