= John of Kelso =

Medieval Scottish bishop

John (died 1207) was a late 12th century and early 13th century Tironensian monk and bishop. By the time he first appears in the records, as Bishop-elect of Aberdeen in December 1199, he was the prior of Kelso Abbey, that is, deputy to the Abbot of Kelso. He achieved consecration as Bishop of Aberdeen by 20 June 1200, though the date on which this took place is unknown.

John's episcopate, like many from this era, is badly documented, and little is known about his activities. He assisted at the Provincial Council held by the Papal legate, John of Salerno, at Perth in December 1200. His name occurs as a witness to three charters of David of Huntingdon, Lord of Garioch and Earl of Huntingdon, charters preserved in the cartulary of Lindores Abbey. Ratifications of grants made by Gille Críst, Earl of Mar are recorded. He died on 13 October 1207.

Religious titles
Preceded by Matthew	Bishop of Aberdeen; 1199–1207	Succeeded by Adam de Kald
