= Frederic Deane =

English bishop

The Right Reverend Frederic Deane DD
- Bishop of Aberdeen and Orkney
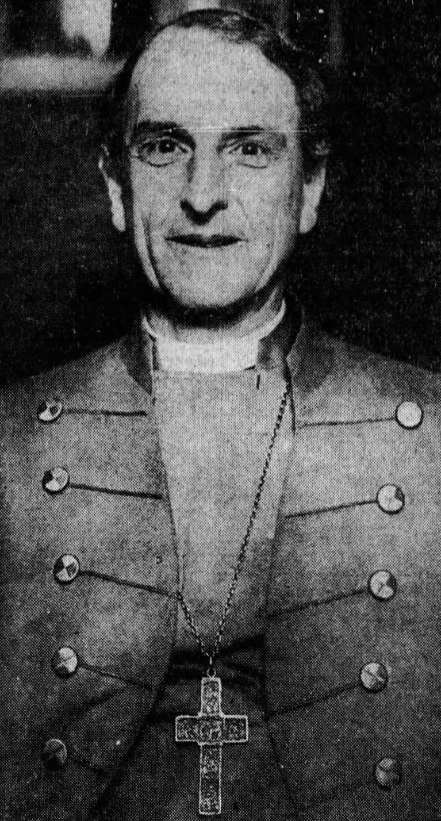
- Deane (c. 1927)
- Church: Scottish Episcopal Church
- Diocese: Aberdeen and Orkney
- Elected: 1917
- In office: 1917-1943
- Predecessor: Anthony Mitchell
- Successor: Herbert Hall

Orders
- Consecration: 1917

Personal details
- Born: 19 September 1868 Stainton le Vale, Lincolnshire, England
- Died: 1952
- Denomination: Anglican
- Parents: Francis Hugh Deane & Emma Anne Deane

Frederic Llewellyn Deane (19 September 1868 - 1952) was the inaugural Provost of St. Mary's Cathedral, Glasgow and then bishop of Aberdeen and Orkney from 1917 to 1943.

== Biography ==
Frederic was born at Stainton le Vale in Lincolnshire on 19 September 1868, the son of Francis Hugh Deane, Rector of Horsington and Stainton, and his wife and 2nd cousin, Emma Anne, the daughter of Robert Micklem Deane of Caversham in Oxfordshire (now Berkshire). Educated at Keble College, Oxford, he had previously been a Curate in Kettering and Vicar of St Andrew, Diocese of Leicester.

Anglican Communion titles
New office	Provost of St Mary's Cathedral, Glasgow; 1908–1917 (also rector since 1904)	Succeeded by Ambrose Lethbridge
Preceded by Anthony Mitchell	Bishop of Aberdeen and Orkney; 1917–1943	Succeeded by Herbert Hall
