= Folla Rule =

Coordinates: 57°23′N 2°26′W

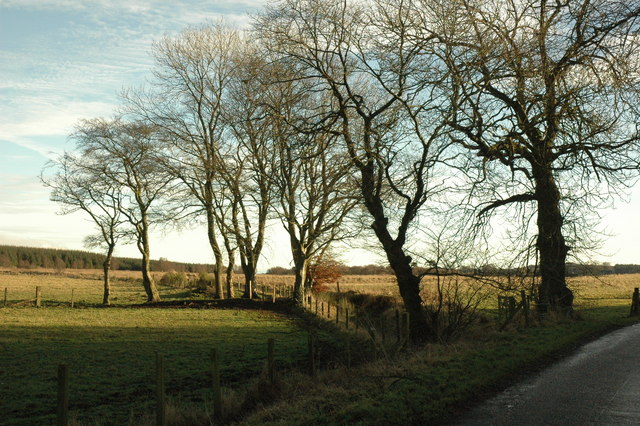
Red Burn near Folla Rule

Folla Rule is a hamlet in Aberdeenshire, Scotland, on the site of the 1376 chapel of St Rule at Folla. Another church, St George's Episcopal, was built in 1796. It has been altered several times, with a new north arcade, lengthened chancel (by Arthur Clyne in 1897), and finally into a house. The rectory, dating to 1800, is "a substantial classical building with red sandstone dressings". It also has a rectangular fanlight.

== Bibliography ==
- McKean, Charles (1990), Banff & Buchan, Royal Incorporation of Architects in Scotland, ISBN 978-1-85158-231-0
