= Anne Dyer =

British Anglican bishop and academic administrator

The Right Reverend Anne Dyer
- Bishop of Aberdeen and Orkney
- Church: Scottish Episcopal Church
- Diocese: Aberdeen and Orkney
- Elected: 9 November 2017
- Installed: 1 March 2018
- Predecessor: Bob Gillies
- Previous post: Warden of Cranmer Hall, Durham (2005–2011)

Orders
- Ordination: 1987 (deacon); 1994 (priest)
- Consecration: 1 March 2018 by Mark Strange

Personal details
- Born: February 1957 (age 69) Yorkshire, England
- Denomination: Anglicanism
- Spouse: Roger
- Children: One daughter
- Education: St Anne's College, Oxford; Wycliffe Hall, Oxford; King's College, London

Anne Catherine Dyer (born February 1957) is a British Anglican bishop, and previously an academic administrator.

In 2018, she became Bishop of Aberdeen and Orkney in the Scottish Episcopal Church. Subject to a report process, with a recommendation that she step aside permanently, then mediation, she was suspended from office on 10 August 2022 after allegations of misconduct were made against her. She was reinstated as Bishop of Aberdeen and Orkney 8 October 2024 after the prosecutor concluded it was not in the public interest to continue with disciplinary action.

Previously, from 2005 to 2011, she was the Warden of Cranmer Hall, Durham, a theological college of the Church of England. Thereafter, she was Rector of Holy Trinity Church, Haddington, East Lothian in the Diocese of Edinburgh (in the Scottish Episcopal Church) between 2011 and 2018.

== Early life and education ==
Dyer was born in February 1957 in Bradford, Yorkshire, England. She was educated at Bradford Girls' Grammar School, an all-girls private school. She studied chemistry at St Anne's College, Oxford, graduating with a Bachelor of Arts (BA) degree: as per tradition, her BA was later promoted to a Master of Arts (MA Oxon) degree. She then worked as a business analyst/systems analyst at Unilever.

In 1984, Dyer entered Wycliffe Hall, Oxford, an Evangelical Anglican theological college, to train for ordained ministry. During this time, she also studied theology. She left theological college in 1987 to be ordained in the Church of England. She continued her theological studies, and completed a Master of Theology (MTh) degree at King's College, London in 1989.

== Ordained ministry ==
Dyer was ordained in the Church of England as a deacon in 1987 and as a priest in 1994. All Dyer's parish ministry in the Church of England was spent in the Diocese of Rochester. While she continued her studies, she held two non-stipendiary minister (NSM) appointments: at St John's Church, Eden Park (1987 to 1988), and at St George's Church, Beckenham (1988 to 1989). From 1989 to 1994, she was parish deacon of Christ Church, Luton. In 1993, she was appointed an associate adviser in evangelism for the diocese. From 1994 to 1998, she was also an NSM of St Barnabas' Church, Istead Rise. Then, from 1998 to 2004, she was the Ministry Development Officer for the Diocese of Rochester. In 2000, she was appointed an Honorary Canon of Rochester Cathedral.

In August 2004, Dyer was announced as the next Warden of Cranmer Hall, Durham. Cranmer Hall is an evangelical Anglican theological college that forms part of St John's College, Durham University. In January 2005, she took up the appointment following her licensing by the Bishop of Durham (Tom Wright). In 2008, she was appointed an honorary canon of Durham Cathedral. She stepped down as warden in 2011, and was succeeded by Mark Tanner.

In 2011, Dyer moved to the Scottish Episcopal Church, having been appointed rector of Holy Trinity Church, Haddington, East Lothian in the Diocese of Edinburgh. Since 2015, she has also been a member of the council of the Scottish Episcopal Institute, the Scottish Episcopal Church's theological college.

== Episcopal ministry ==
On 9 November 2017, Dyer was selected as the next Bishop of Aberdeen and Orkney, making her the first woman to have become a bishop in the Scottish Episcopal Church. Her selection caused controversy due to her gender, support of same-sex marriage, and that she was not elected by the diocese itself (she was appointed by the house of Bishops after the diocese failed to choose its own bishop). Two senior clergy in the diocese resigned their diocesan roles in protest, including Emsley Nimmo, the dean of the Diocese of Aberdeen and Orkney. She was consecrated a bishop on 1 March 2018 during a service at St Andrew's Cathedral, Aberdeen.

=== Allegations of bullying and investigation ===
In February 2021, Dyer was accused of bullying by a number of clergy, laypeople and church employees in The Times. Amongst the issues reported in The Times article was that an independent investigation had been commissioned after Dyer dismissed the musical director at her cathedral. The investigation report was highly critical of Dyer, and found that there were “insufficient grounds” for the dismissal. In March 2021, the College of Bishops commissioned Iain Torrance to lead an Independent Review into "difficulties" in the Diocese following a series of allegations regarding the Bishop. In August 2021 the College of Bishops announced their intention to defer publication of the report and move to a second stage of reviewing.

A few days later The Times reported Torrance's findings which had taken evidence from over 100 people. His report, which Dyer tried to have changed after completion, found that there was a culture of bullying and "systematic dysfunction in the diocese", and that there were previous similar problems in Dyer's time at Durham. Professor Torrance stated that: "Without colluding in what I much fear is a repetition of the past, I cannot recommend the continuation of a tenure in which I fear that more people will be made to feel diminished and discouraged." He recommended that Dyer be immediately sent on sabbatical and that she should step down from her position permanently.

However, the bishops decided, instead, to establish a mediation process. Dyer has stated that she herself had been a victim of bullying, that the diocese was "not well", and that "The mediation process being offered to our diocese is our treatment".

On 10 August 2022, Dyer was suspended as bishop after the SEC announced they had received two complaints of bullying. An Episcopal Synod (meeting of bishops) met on 30 September, voting 3 to 2 to refuse the appeal and continue Dyer's suspension from office. The church stated that "The suspension does not constitute disciplinary action and does not imply any assumption that misconduct has been committed".

On 8 November 2023, the church announced that the case had been referred to the church's Procurator to decide if the case should be referred to their Clergy Disciplinary Tribunal. Subsequently, the Procurator resigned "to allow the appointment of a replacement who has no pre-existing connection of any nature to any of the parties or witnesses potentially involved, so as to avoid any suggestion that the process was not being conducted in an independent and impartial manner", to be replaced by a new procurator on 23 January 2024. A tribunal hearing on three complaints will be held in Edinburgh in September 2024.

From September 2022, John Armes was the acting Bishop of Aberdeen and Orkney, while Dyer remains suspended. Dorsey McConnell, former Bishop of Pittsburgh, took on the role on 1 November 2023.

In April 2024, it was reported that Dyer was still under suspension and must to face a Clergy Discipline Tribunal over allegations of conduct unbecoming of a cleric.

However, on 8 October the church dropped all charges against Dyer even though the prosecutor stated that “there is sufficient evidence to provide a realistic prospect of conviction in respect of each allegation.” He said that the decision was due to some complainants having misgivings about giving testimony and being cross-examined. The dropping of charges meant that Dyer's suspension immediately ended and she could return as Bishop on 24 October. The dropping of charges caused shock amongst parishioners, one telling the BBC that the decision “is profoundly concerning and makes a mockery of the Church's disciplinary process.” Another commented that the decision “sets a dangerous precedent that, in this case, has had the effect of shielding one of its own senior leaders from further scrutiny at a tribunal.”

Following the protests, four of the six Bishops (who include Dyer) of the Scottish Episcopal Church wrote a letter and also released a statement to the Church Times calling on Dyer to resign.

=== Additional allegations ===
In 2024 allegations were submitted to the Scottish Charity Regulator charging that Dyer oversaw submission of incorrect accounts for the Episcopal Diocese of Aberdeen and Orkney. A dossier of allegations was submitted to the regulator by Simon Arthur, 4th Baron Glenarthur in 2022. and again in 2024.

A spokesman for Dyer said that she "emphatically denies these false and malicious allegations ... They appear to be merely the latest salvo in a relentless campaign by a small handful of individuals seeking to force Bishop Anne from office due to their beliefs on issues such as female bishops and same-sex marriage ... It's important to note that several of the allegations pre-date Bishop Anne's appointment to the diocese and that during her tenure the assets of the diocese increased considerably. Accounts for the diocese were prepared by professional accountants following detailed audits, and claims of 'fabricated' meetings are beyond parody".

=== Views ===
Dyer identifies with the Open Evangelical tradition of Anglicanism.

In December 2014, Dyer signed an open letter to the bishops of the Scottish Episcopal Church that was supportive of same-sex marriage: it concluded with a "wish to make clear our continuing commitment to affirm and support all people in our church, and to recognise and rejoice in all marriages, of whatever sexual orientation, as true signs of the love of God in Christ." With the SEC voting to allow same-sex marriages, she conducted her first such marriage in October 2017.

== Personal life ==
Dyer is married to Roger. Together they had one child, a daughter, who died, aged 30, in 2021.

Academic offices
Preceded by Steven Croft	Warden of Cranmer Hall, Durham; 2005–2011	Succeeded by Mark Tanner
