= Rowland Ellis (bishop) =

British bishop

The Right Reverend Rowland Ellis
- Bishop of Aberdeen and Orkney
- Church: Scottish Episcopal Church
- Diocese: Aberdeen and Orkney
- In office: 1906-1911
- Predecessor: Arthur Douglas
- Successor: Anthony Mitchell

Orders
- Consecration: 1906

Personal details
- Born: 24 April 1841 Caerwys, Flintshire, Wales
- Died: 11 December 1911 (aged 70) Turriff, Scotland
- Denomination: Anglican
- Education: Jesus College, Oxford

Rowland Ellis (24 April 1841 – 11 December 1911) was a Welsh bishop who held the post of Bishop of Aberdeen and Orkney in the Scottish Episcopal Church from 1906 until his death.

== Life ==
Ellis was born in Caerwys, Flintshire, and was educated at Ruthin School before graduating from Jesus College, Oxford, with a BA degree, in 1863. After being ordained in 1864, he held various church positions in Wales: curate of Gresford (1864–68), vicar of Gwersyllt (1868–72) and vicar of Mold 1872–84 (also Rural Dean of Mold from 1873 to 1884). He was a friend of William Ewart Gladstone, who lived nearby in Hawarden.

He joined the Scottish Episcopal Church when he became rector of St Paul's Church in Edinburgh in 1884. He was synod clerk of Edinburgh, and canon of St. Mary's Cathedral, and he became Bishop of Aberdeen and Orkney in 1906. He was consecrated on 25 April of that year at St. Andrew's Church, Aberdeen.

He wrote a number of theological works, including Some aspects of woman's life: five lenten addresses (1881), and was regarded as a strong opponent of disestablishment of the Church in Wales. He died in his sleep at Delgatie Castle, Turriff, Aberdeenshire, where he was staying as a guest of Charles Hay, 20th Earl of Erroll.

Anglican Communion titles
Preceded by Arthur Douglas	Bishop of Aberdeen and Orkney; 1906–1911	Succeeded by Anthony Mitchell
