= Frederick Darwent =

Bishop of Aberdeen and Orkney (1927–2020)

The Right Reverend Frederick Darwent
- Bishop Emeritus of Aberdeen and Orkney
- Church: Scottish Episcopal Church
- Diocese: Aberdeen and Orkney
- Elected: 1976
- In office: 1976-1991
- Predecessor: Ian Begg
- Successor: Bruce Cameron

Orders
- Ordination: 1963
- Consecration: 1976 by Francis Moncreiff

Personal details
- Born: 20 April 1927 Liverpool, England
- Died: 15 January 2020 (aged 92)
- Denomination: Anglican

Frederick Charles Darwent (20 April 1927 – 15 January 2020) was bishop of Aberdeen and Orkney, from 1976 to 1991.

== Biography ==
Born in Liverpool, Darwent was educated at Ormskirk Grammar School. After military service in the Far East with the Royal Inniskilling Fusiliers he was ordained Deacon in 1961; and Priest in 1963. He was a Curate in Wigan then held incumbencies in Strichen, New Pitsligo and Fraserburgh. He was made a Canon of St Andrew's Cathedral, Aberdeen in 1971; and was Dean of Aberdeen and Orkney from 1973 to 1978. He was also a JP in Aberdeen from 1989 to 1996. He died in January 2020 at the age of 92.

Anglican Communion titles
Preceded by Ian Forbes Begg	Dean of Aberdeen and Orkney; 1973–1978	Succeeded by Alexander Campbell Adamson
Preceded by Ian Forbes Begg	Bishop of Aberdeen and Orkney; 1976–1991	Succeeded by Andrew Bruce Cameron
