= Frederick Easson =

Scottish bishop

The Right Reverend Frederick Easson
- Bishop of Aberdeen and Orkney
- Church: Scottish Episcopal Church
- Diocese: Aberdeen and Orkney
- Elected: 1956
- In office: 1956–1972
- Predecessor: Herbert Hall
- Successor: Ian Begg

Orders
- Consecration: 1956

Personal details
- Born: 29 July 1905
- Died: 11 February 1988 (aged 82)
- Denomination: Anglican

Edward Frederick Easson (29 July 1905 – 11 February 1988) was a Scottish Episcopal Church bishop of the Diocese of Aberdeen and Orkney in Scotland, serving from 1956 to 1972 and Dean of Aberdeen and Orkney from 1953 to 1956.

== Biography ==
He was educated at Morgan Academy, the University of St Andrews and Edinburgh Theological College. He was a Maths and Science teacher at Lasswade Secondary School from 1929 to 1931; Assistant Curate of St Peter, Edinburgh from 1933 to 1936; and of St Aidan, Craigmillar from 1936 to 1939; Rector of St Peter, Peterhead from 1940 to 1948; and of St Devenick, Bieldside until his appointment as Dean.

Religious titles
Preceded by George Bartlet	Dean of Aberdeen and Orkney; 1953–1956	Succeeded by Richard Elual Kerrin
