= Bob Gillies =

British Anglican bishop (born 1951)

The Right Reverend Bob Gillies
- Previous Bishop of Aberdeen and Orkney
- Church: Scottish Episcopal Church
- Diocese: Diocese of Aberdeen and Orkney
- Elected: April 2006
- In office: 2006 - 2016
- Other post: Dean of the Diocese of St Andrews, Dunkeld and Dunblane (2004-2006)

Personal details
- Born: Robert Arthur Gillies; 21 October 1951 (age 75)
- Denomination: Anglicanism
- Spouse: Katherine Elizabeth Greening Tucker (m. 1976)
- Children: 4 (1 deceased)

Robert Arthur "Bob" Gillies (born 21 October 1951) is a retired British Anglican bishop. From 2006 to 2016, he served as the Bishop of Aberdeen and Orkney in the Scottish Episcopal Church. He is also a published author.

== Early life and education ==
Gillies was born on 21 October 1951. From 1969 to 1971, he worked as a medical laboratory technician. He then trained for ordination and studied theology at the University of Edinburgh. He graduated with a Bachelor of Divinity (BD) degree in 1978.

Gillies later undertook postgraduate research at the University of St Andrews, and completed his Doctor of Philosophy (PhD) degree in 1991. His doctoral thesis was titled "Person and experience: a study in the thought of Edgar Sheffield Brightman".

== Ordained ministry ==
Gillies was ordained in the Scottish Episcopal Church as a deacon in 1976 and a priest in 1978. He served curacies at Christ Church, Falkirk and Christ Church, Morningside, Edinburgh. He was a Chaplain at the University of Dundee from 1984 to 1991. After this he was Rector of St Andrews Episcopal Church, St Andrews. From 2004 to 2006, he was also Dean of St Andrews, Dunkeld and Dunblane.

In April 2006, Gillies was elected bishop of the Diocese of Aberdeen and Orkney. He was consecrated a bishop at St Andrew's Cathedral, Aberdeen on 23 September 2007. On 3 May 2016, it was announced that Gillies would retire from his position as diocesan bishop later in the year; he subsequently retired on 31 October 2016.

Gillies continues to serve as assistant clergy within the Diocese of St Andrews, Dunkeld and Dunblane, especially in the church of St James the Great, Cupar.

=== Views ===
In 2016, Gillies voted against changing the wording of the marriage clause to allow for same-sex marriage in the Scottish Episcopal Church; he was one of two bishops to vote against. The motion was approved by 97 votes to 33.

== Personal life ==
In 1976, Gillies married Katherine Elizabeth Greening Tucker. Together they have four sons, one of whom pre-deceased his parents.

Scottish Episcopal Church titles
Preceded by Randall George Lewis MacAlister	Dean of St Andrews, Dunkeld and Dunblane; 2004-2006	Succeeded by Kenneth William Rathband
Preceded by Andrew Bruce Cameron	Bishop of Aberdeen and Orkney; 2006-2016	Succeeded by Anne Dyer
