= Herbert Hall (bishop) =

Scottish bishop (1889–1955)

The Right Reverend Herbert Hall
- Bishop of Aberdeen and Orkney
- Church: Scottish Episcopal Church
- Diocese: Aberdeen and Orkney
- Elected: 1943
- In office: 1943–1955
- Predecessor: Frederic Deane
- Successor: Frederick Easson

Orders
- Ordination: 1913
- Consecration: 21 September 1943 by Logie Danson

Personal details
- Born: 22 December 1889
- Died: 6 December 1955 (aged 65)
- Denomination: Anglican
- Parents: Charles Hall & Barbara Black
- Spouse: Helen Maven Aitken
- Children: 2
- Education: University of Aberdeen

Herbert William Hall (22 December 1889 – 6 December 1955) was Bishop of Aberdeen and Orkney in Scotland from 1943 to 1955.

== Biography ==
The son of Charles Hall and Barbara Black, he was educated at St John's School, New Pitsligo and the University of Aberdeen. He was a teacher at Peterhead Academy from 1904 to 1911 when he entered Edinburgh Theological College. He was ordained in 1913 and began his ecclesiastical career as a curate at St John the Evangelist, Greenock. After this he was Rector at St Mary, Port Glasgow, and then held further incumbencies in Galashiels and Portobello.

He married Helen Maven Aitken in 1919 and had one son and one daughter.

== Notes ==
Anglican Communion titles
Preceded by Frederic Deane	Bishop of Aberdeen and Orkney; 1943–1955	Succeeded by Frederick Easson
