= Thomas Suther =

Scottish Episcopalian bishop

The Right Reverend Thomas Suther
- Bishop of Aberdeen and Orkney
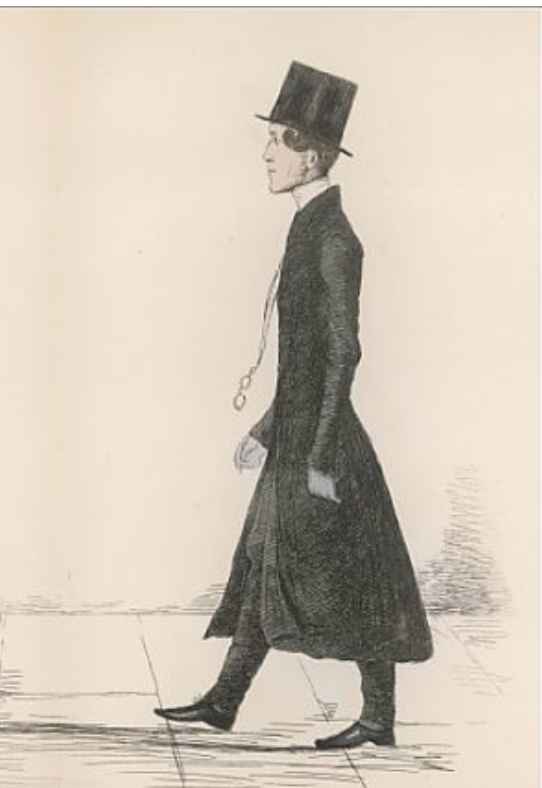
- Rev. Thomas Suther
- Church: Scottish Episcopal Church
- Diocese: Aberdeen and Orkney
- Elected: 1865
- In office: 1865-1883
- Successor: Arthur Douglas

Orders
- Ordination: 1837
- Consecration: 1865

Personal details
- Born: 5 February 1814 Edinburgh
- Died: 23 January 1883 (aged 68) Sanremo, Liguria, Italy
- Denomination: Anglican

Thomas George Spink Suther (5 February 1814 – 23 January 1883) was the Scottish Episcopalian bishop of Aberdeen from 1857 to 1865 and first bishop of Aberdeen and Orkney from 1865 to 1883.

Suther was born in Edinburgh to Deputy Inspector General Peter Suther, M.D. who was posted to Nova Scotia when his son was an infant. His father was a doctor in the Royal Navy and was stationed at Halifax c.1814-1829. Sutherland was educated at King's College, Windsor in Halifax and ordained in 1837.

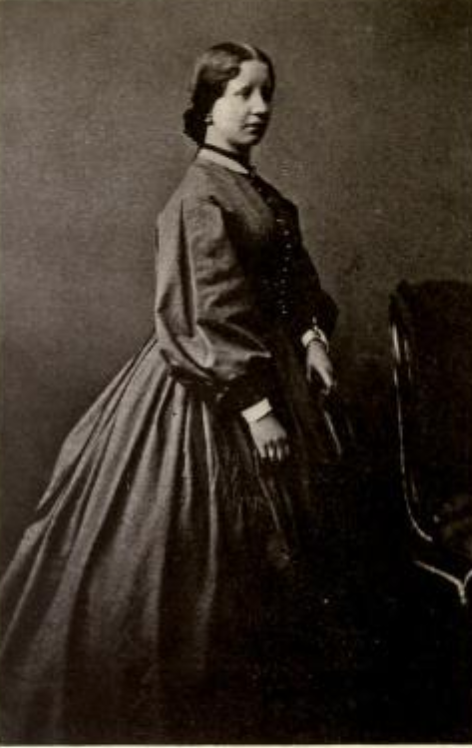
Catherine (Fraser) Suther, Aberdeen

At age 21, Suther moved to Scotland and became a curate in St Paul's and St George's Church, Edinburgh, for 19 years. After curacies in Edinburgh and at St James Scottish Episcopal Church in Leith he came to St Andrew's Cathedral, Aberdeen in 1856. He died at San Remo on 23 January 1883.

In 1835, Suther married Catherine Fraser, daughter of James Fraser.

Anglican Communion titles
Preceded by --	Bishop of Aberdeen and Orkney; 1865–1883	Succeeded by Arthur Douglas
