= Henry le Chen =

Scoto-Norman bishop

- Bishop of Aberdeen
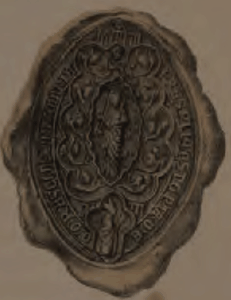
- Church: Roman Catholic Church
- See: Diocese of Aberdeen
- In office: 1282–1328
- Predecessor: Hugh de Benin
- Successor: Walter Herok
- Previous post: Precentor of Aberdeen Cathedral

Orders
- Consecration: 1282

Personal details
- Born: Mid 13th century North-east Scotland.
- Died: Probably Aberdeen 1328 x 1329

Henry le Chen [le Cheyn, le Chein, Cheyne, de Chene] was a late 13th-century and early 14th-century Scoto-Norman bishop. Hector Boece claims that he was the nephew of John III Comyn, Lord of Badenoch, but no contemporary evidence supports this. Cheyne belonged to a family with Norman roots which was well established in the northeast of Scotland, holding significant amounts of territory on the boundaries of the Earldom of Buchan.

== Life ==
Henry emerges for the first time - as Precentor of Aberdeen Cathedral - when his name occurs in a document dated to 22 January 1277. Despite the fact he was only a deacon, after the death of the former bishop, Hugh de Benin, the chapter unanimously elected le Chen to be the new Bishop of Aberdeen. Pope Martin IV originally cancelled the election because le Chen had not been yet ordained a priest, but reversed his decision and commissioned Robert Wishart, Alan de St Edmund and William, the bishops of Glasgow, Caithness and Dunblane respectively, to consecrate le Chen after one of them had ordained him a priest.

Le Chen's strong Comyn connections meant that, in the succession dispute which followed the deaths of Alexander III of Scotland and Margaret, Maid of Norway, he firmly supported the Comyn-backed claims of John Balliol; he was one of the auditors employed by Balliol during the Great Cause. Although one of the senior royal councillors during the reign of King John Balliol, when King Edward I of England invaded and deposed King John, le Chen quickly swore an oath of fealty to Edward, and was so well trusted by the King that the latter put him in charge of the sheriffdom of Aberdeen. In the period immediately following the uprising and restoration of the throne by Robert de Brus (Robert the Bruce), Earl of Carrick, in 1306, le Chen was noticeably lukewarm to the new king (now Robert I of Scotland), and at some point was temporarily deprived of the temporalities of his see, though there is no direct evidence that he suffered exile.

In 1309 he attended Robert's first parliament and was part of the renewal of the Treaty of Perth in 1312, but Bishop Henry nevertheless held a low profile for the remainder of the decade. However, despite the complete success of the Bruce cause, no other bishop is found to be promoted, and le Chen was a loyal subject of the king by the end of the decade when he was summoned to the papal curia (16 August 1320) to account for the behaviour of his king. On 16 June 1321, Pope John XXII excommunicated Bishop Henry, and on 23 May 1322, commanded the bishops of Winchester and Dunblane to promulgate the sentence.

Henry died c.1328 and certainly before 11 June 1329, the same year as King Robert. Pope John XXII referred to le Chen as "of good memory", meaning that Henry had been absolved of his sentence before his death. He was credited with constructing a bridge over the river Don.

== Notes ==
Catholic Church titles
Preceded by Hugh de Benin	Bishop of Aberdeen; 1282–1328 x 1329	Succeeded by Walter Herok
