= Ian Begg (bishop) =

Bishop of Aberdeen and Orkney

The Right Reverend Ian Begg
- Bishop of Aberdeen and Orkney
- Church: Scottish Episcopal Church
- Diocese: Aberdeen and Orkney
- Elected: 1973
- In office: 1973–1976
- Predecessor: Frederick Easson
- Successor: Frederick Darwent

Orders
- Ordination: 1935
- Consecration: 1 March 1973 by Francis Moncreiff

Personal details
- Born: 12 February 1911
- Died: 18 March 1989 (aged 78)
- Denomination: Anglican
- Education: University of Aberdeen

Ian Forbes Begg (12 February 1911 – 18 March 1989) was an Anglican prelate who served in the Scottish Episcopal Church as the Bishop of Aberdeen and Orkney from 1973 to 1976.

== Biography ==
He was born on 12 February 1911, the son of the Reverend John Smith Begg and Elizabeth Macintyre. He was educated at the University of Aberdeen, graduating with a Master of Arts in 1931. He was ordained a deacon in 1933 and a priest in 1935. His first pastoral appointment was a curate at St Paul's Church in Liverpool from 1933 to 1934. He moved to Scotland, where his next appointments were as curate-in-charge at St Ninian's Church, Aberdeen (1935–1973), Canon of St Andrew's Cathedral, Aberdeen (1965–1969), and Dean of Aberdeen and Orkney (1969–1972). During that time, he married Lillie Taylor Paterson in 1949, and was bestowed an Honorary Doctorate of Divinity from the University of Aberdeen in 1971.

He was consecrated the Bishop of Aberdeen and Orkney on 1 March 1973, the principal consecrator was Francis Moncreiff, the Primus of the Scottish Episcopal Church, with bishops Sprott, Wimbush, Hare Duke, Sessford, Easson, Russell, Wilson, and Thomas as co-consecrators.

After his retirement in 1977, he was priest-in-charge of St Machar's Church, Bucksburn, on the outskirts of Aberdeen. He died on 18 March 1989, aged 78.

== Bibliography ==
- Bertie, David M. (2000). Scottish Episcopal Clergy, 1689-2000. Edinburgh: T & T Clark. ISBN 0-567-08746-8.

Anglican Communion titles
Preceded by Herbert Hall	Bishop of Aberdeen and Orkney; 1973–1976	Succeeded by Frederick Darwent
