= Diocese of Aberdeen and Orkney =

Anglican diocese of the Scottish Episcopal Church

Coordinates: 57°08′59″N 2°05′46″W

Location
- Country: Scotland
- Ecclesiastical province: Scotland
- Subdivisions: Aberdeen City, Aberdeenshire, Chaplaincies, The Isles
- Headquarters: Marischal College, Aberdeen

Statistics
- Congregations: 37

Information
- Denomination: Scottish Episcopal Church
- Cathedral: St Andrew's Cathedral, Aberdeen

Current leadership
- Bishop: Anne Dyer, Bishop of Aberdeen and Orkney
- Dean: Jennifer Holden

Map
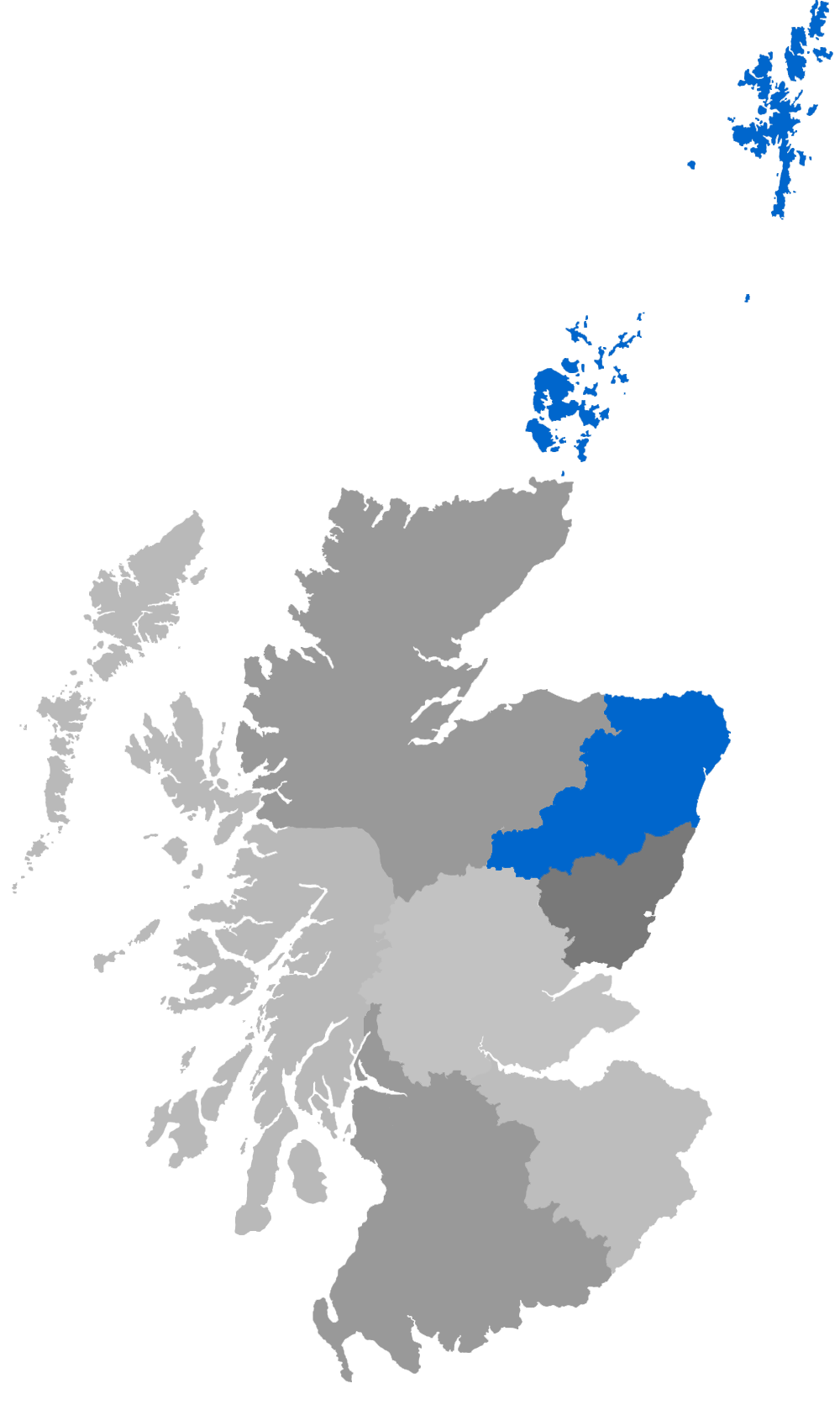
- Map showing Aberdeen & Orkney within Scotland

Website
- aberdeen.anglican.org

The Diocese of Aberdeen and Orkney is one of the seven dioceses of the Scottish Episcopal Church. Created in 1865, the diocese covers the historic county of Aberdeenshire, and the Orkney and Shetland island groups. It shares with the Roman Catholic Diocese of Aberdeen a Christian heritage that can be traced back to Norman times, and incorporates the ancient Diocese of Orkney, founded in 1035.

The diocese is considered the most conservative of the dioceses of the Scottish Episcopal Church, and was the only diocese to reject a change in the church's teaching to allow same-sex marriage in 2017.

The first female bishop of the SEC, Anne Dyer, was appointed to the diocese in November 2017 and consecrated and enthroned on 3 March 2018. Her gender, support of same-sex marriage, and the fact that she was not elected by the diocese itself (she was appointed by the College of Bishops in accordance with the SEC canonical process when a diocese fails to meet the requirements to elect its own bishop), caused some controversy, and two senior clergy, the Dean (Emsley Nimmo) and another member of the Cathedral Chapter, resigned their diocesan roles in protest. After further resignations by other clergy, the Westhill Community Church voted to leave the SEC in January 2019. Bishop Dyer was suspended from office on 10 August 2022 after allegations of misconduct were made but reinstated on 8 October 2024.

The diocese has a strong companion link with the Episcopal Diocese of Connecticut and the Episcopal Church in the United States of America. Samuel Seabury, the first Episcopal bishop outside the British Isles, was consecrated in 1784 by Robert Kilgour, Bishop of Aberdeen, and John Skinner, coadjutor bishop. Clarence Coleridge, suffragan bishop of Connecticut, was consecrated by a Bishop of Aberdeen in 1981; he was elected 13th diocesan bishop of Connecticut in 1993.

== Area and population ==
The diocese covers the historic counties of Orkney (population 21,500), Zetland (population 23,000), Aberdeenshire except the Huntly area (population 393,000), the Banff, Buckie and Cullen areas of Banffshire (population 29,500), and the Banchory and Lower Deeside areas of Kincardineshire (population 26,000).

== List of bishops ==
Bishops of Aberdeen and Orkney
From	Until	Incumbent	Notes
1865	1883	Thomas Suther	Died in office.
1883	1905	Arthur Douglas	Died in office.
1906	1911	Rowland Ellis	Died in office.
1912	1917	Anthony Mitchell	Died in office.
1917	1943	Frederic Deane	
1943	1955	Herbert Hall	Died in office.
1956	1972	Frederick Easson	
1973	1976	Ian Begg	
1976	1991	Frederick Darwent	
1991	2006	Bruce Cameron	Installed 1992, Primus 2000–2006.
2006	2016	Robert (Bob) Gillies	
2018	Incumbent	Anne Dyer	First female bishop in the SEC

== List of deans ==
The following served as Dean of Aberdeen diocese:

- bef. 1846 – 1850: John Cumming, of Longside
- 1850 – 1865: David Wilson, of Woodhead

The following have served as Dean of Aberdeen and Orkney:

- 1865 to 1880: David Wilson (title changed)
- 1880 to 1886: Arthur Ranken
- 1886 to 1887: Alexander Harper
- 1887 to 1896: William Webster
- 1896 to 1906: William Walker
- 1907 to 1909: Myers Danson
- 1910 to 1922: James Wiseman
- 1922 to 1934: Robert Mackay
- 1934 to 1948: George Bartlet
- 1948 to 1953: John Wattie
- 1953 to 1956: Frederick Easson, later bishop
- 1956 to 1969: Richard Kerrin
- 1969 to 1972: Ian Begg, later bishop
- 1973 to 1978: Frederick Darwent, later bishop
- 1978 to 1983: Alexander Adamson
- 1983 to 1988: Denis Bovey
- 1988 to 2008: Gerald Stranraer-Mull
- 2008 to 2017: Emsley Nimmo
- 2017 to 2020: vacant
- 2020 to 2021: Dennis Berk
- 2021 to 2025: vacant
- 2025 to present: Jennifer Holden

== Churches and clergy ==
The diocese currently has 23 stipendiary clergy and 37 churches.

Benefice	Churches	Link	Founded (building)	Clergy
Banff	St Andrew, Banff		1722 (1833)	J. Paisey
Buckie	All Saints, Buckie		c. 1689 (1876)	J. Paisey
Turriff	St Congan, Turriff		1738 (1862)	-
New Pitsligo	St John the Evangelist, New Pitsligo		1835 (1870s)	-
Strichen	All Saints, Strichen		1861	-
Fraserburgh	St Peter, Fraserburgh		1721 (1892)	-
Longside	St John the Evangelist, Longside		1716 (1854)	R. O'Sullivan
Old Deer	St Drostan, Old Deer		1851	R. O'Sullivan
Peterhead	St Peter, Peterhead		1699 (1814)	R. O'Sullivan
Cruden Bay	St James the Less, Cruden Bay		C18th (1843)	-
Ellon	St Mary-on-the-Rock, Ellon		C18th (1871)	-
Insch	St Drostan, Insch		1894	A. MacDonald
Fyvie	All Saints, Woodhead of Fyvie		1849	A. MacDonald
Oldmeldrum	St Matthew & St George, Oldmeldrum		1863	-
Alford	St Andrew, Alford		1869	M. Blake
Auchindoir	St Mary, Auchindoir			-
Inverurie	St Mary, Inverurie		1841	-
Kemnay	St Anne, Kemnay		1938	-
Whiterashes	All Saints, Whiterashes		1858	-
Aberdeen (Cathedral of St Andrew)	St Andrew's Cathedral, Aberdeen		1817	I. Poobalan
Bieldside
Bieldside	St Devenick, Bieldside		1894 (1903)	
Aberdeen (St Clement)	St Clement, Aberdeen		1960s	J. Hobbs
Aberdeen (St Ninian)	St Ninian, Aberdeen		1936	
Aberdeen (St James)	St James the Less, Aberdeen		1804	
Aberdeen (St John the Evangelist)	St John, Aberdeen		1720 (1851)	
Aberdeen (St Margaret of Scotland)	St Margaret of Scotland, Gallowgate		1867 (1870)	A. Nimmo
Aberdeen (St Mary)	St Mary, Carden Place		1863 (1864)	T. Taggart; J. Hobbs
Bucksburn	St Machar, Bucksburn		1874 (1880)	D. Heddle
Aboyne	St Thomas, Aboyne		1909	
Ballater	St Kentigern, Ballater		C19th (1907)	
Ballater	St Ninian's Chapel, Braemar		1895	
Kincardine O'Neil	Christ Church, Kincardine O'Neil		1866	-
Banchory	St Ternan, Banchory		1851	L. Braybrooke
Burravoe	St Colman, Burravoe		1898	
Lerwick	St Magnus, Lerwick		1861 (1864)	
Kirkwall	St Olaf, Kirkwall		1876	D. Dawson
Stromness	St Mary, Stromness		1885 (1888)	T. Miller

=== Former congregation ===
Benefice	Church	Link	Founded (building)	Seceded from SEC
Westhill Community Church	Westhill Community Church		1972 (2014)	2019

=== Closed churches in the diocese area ===
Name	Founded (building)	Closed
St Peter, Torry		2013
St Mary the Virgin, Cove Bay	1864	2020
St Luke, Cuminestown	1844	
St John the Baptist, Portsoy		2016
Chapel of Christ the Encompasser, Fetlar		2015
St Margaret, Braemar		2001
St Paul, Aberdeen	1867	1986

== Membership ==
Between 2013 and 2023 church membership in the Diocese decreased from 4,214 to 2,419 a fall of 42.6%. According to the Scottish Episcopal Church 42nd Annual Report (2024), there are 1,577 communicants in the Diocese.

== See also ==
- Bishop of Aberdeen (before and after the Reformation)
