= Inverurie (disambiguation) =

Inverurie is a town in Aberdeenshire, Scotland.

Inverurie may also refer to:

- Inverurie (Parliament of Scotland constituency), pre-1707
- Inverurie Academy, a secondary school
- Inverurie and District (ward), a ward in Aberdeenshire Council
- Inverurie Hospital
- Inverurie Loco Works F.C., an association football club
- Inverurie Locomotive Works
- Inverurie railway station
- Inverurie Town Hall, a municipal building
- Battle of Inverurie (disambiguation)
