= Kinkell, Aberdeenshire =

Medieval church located in Aberdeenshire

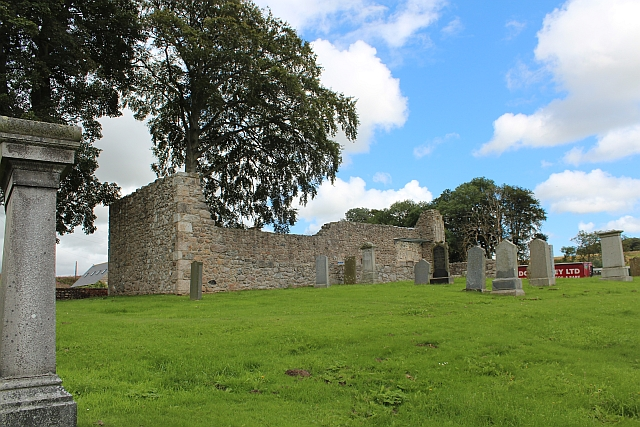
The remains of Kinkell Kirk, Aberdeenshire.

Kinkell is a former parish in the Garioch region of Aberdeenshire. It was named Kinkell (Gaelic for "head church") because its parsonage oversaw six subordinate churches.

== Location ==
The area where Kinkell once stood is now part of the town of Inverurie, Aberdeenshire. The ruins of the Kinkell Kirk sit on the East bank of the River Don, two miles south-southeast of Inverurie

== Kinkell Kirk ==
Kinkell Kirk is a medieval church built in the 1200s and redesigned in 1538. It is dedicated to St Michael.

The 16th-century church which stands in ruins appears to have been redesigned by Alexander Galloway, rector of Kinkell and architect of the first Bridge of Dee in Aberdeen, as his initials can be seen three times inside the remaining internal walls.

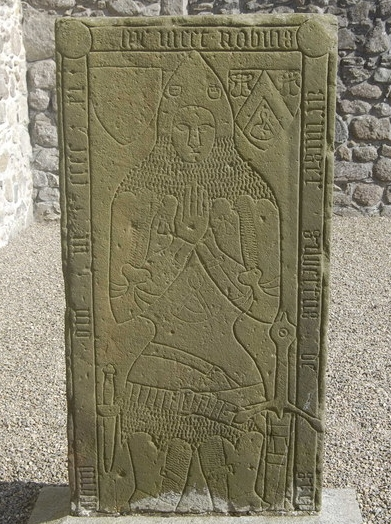
Tombstone of Gilbert de Greenlaw in Kinkell Church

The church had a sculptured tabernacle or aumbry for the Holy Sacrament, a bas-relief of the crucifix and the performance of Mass, and two-thirds of an incised slab representing a knight in armour. The church was lit by an enormous East window.

After many years of exposure to the weather, the carved font of the church was restored in 1851 and placed in St John's Episcopal Church, Aberdeen.

== Gilbert de Greenlaw ==
Gilbert de Greenlaw (1354–1421) was the Bishop of Aberdeen and Bishop-elect of St Andrews. Greenlaw died at the battle of Harlaw on 24 July 1411, where he fought for Alexander Stewart, Earl of Mar against the invading Donald of Islay, Lord of the Isles. He is buried at the nearby Kinkell Kirk.

On the sandstone slab dedicated to him at Kinkell Kirk, Greenlaw is wearing an open-faced bascinet helmet with a mail-reinforced arming doublet beneath plate armour, and is depicted carrying a hand-and-a-half sword.

There are 51 other gravestones at Kinkell Kirk. 8 are recumbent and 43 remain upright.
