= St. Peter's Anglican Church (West LaHave, Nova Scotia) =

Coordinates: 44.307438°N 64.407373°W

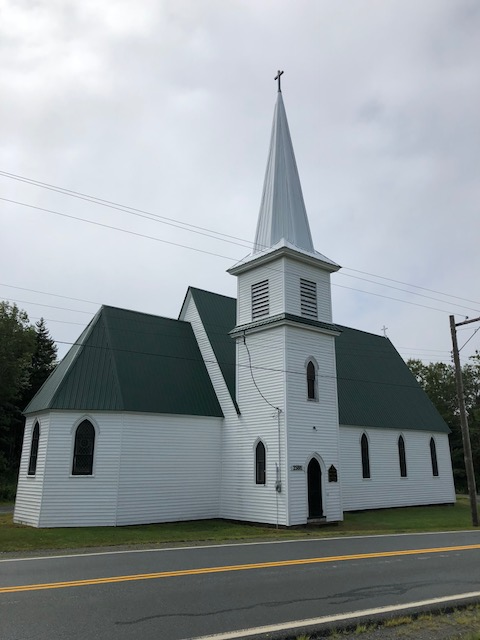
St. Peter's Anglican Church, West LaHave, Nova Scotia

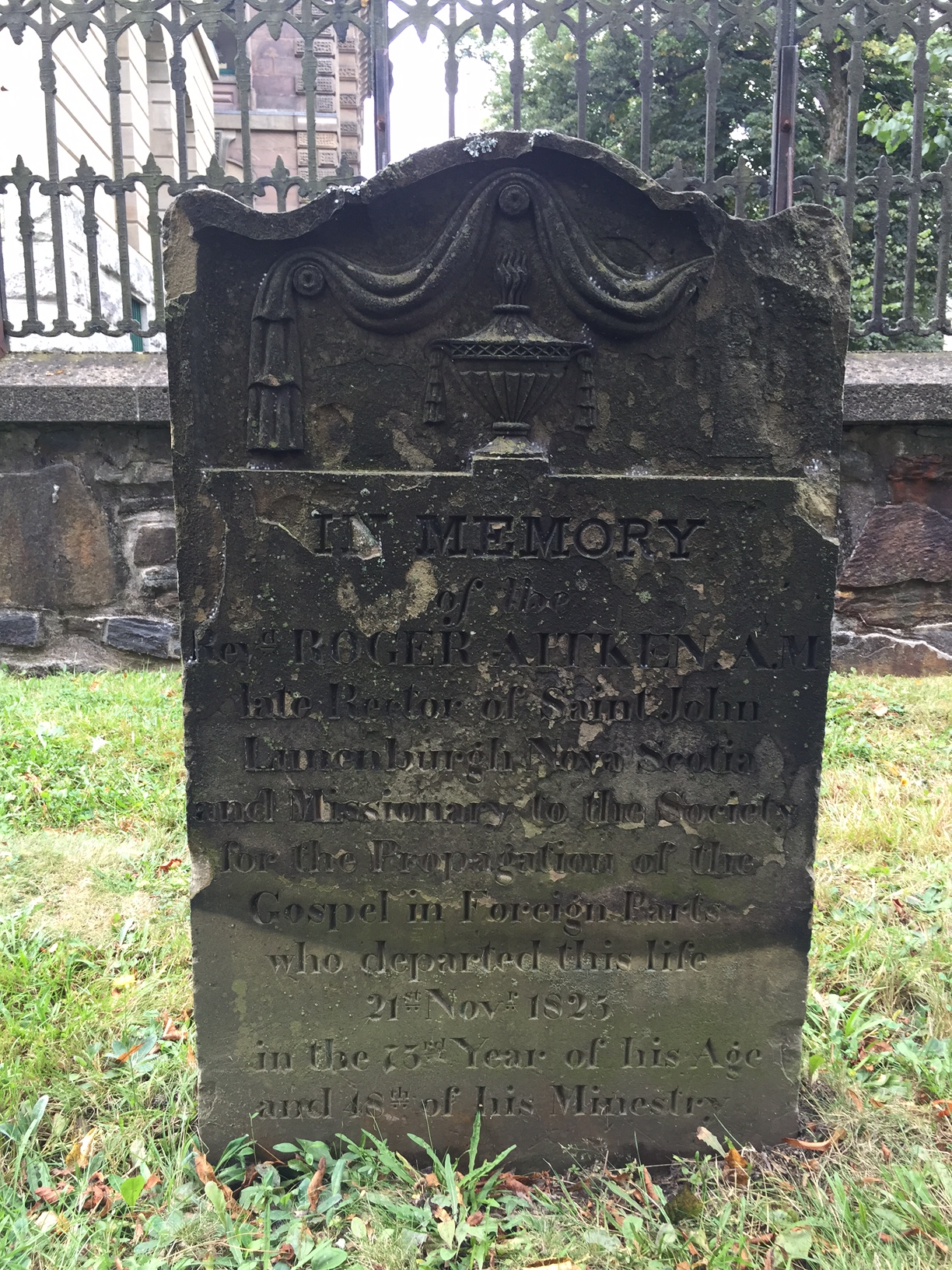
Rev. Roger Aitken, missionary instrumental in establishing St. Peter's Anglican Church and gave the congregation a silver chalice and paten, Old Burying Ground (Halifax, Nova Scotia)

St. Peter's Anglican Church is a church in West LaHave, Nova Scotia (formerly New Dublin) that was established in 1818 by Roger Aitken, the missionary at Lunenburg for Society for the Propagation of the Gospel in Foreign Parts (1817–1825). The first church was built in 1829 and consecrated in 1834. The church remains active. Aitken gave to the church the oldest known Anglican Chalice and Paten in Canada.

== The Chalice and Paten ==
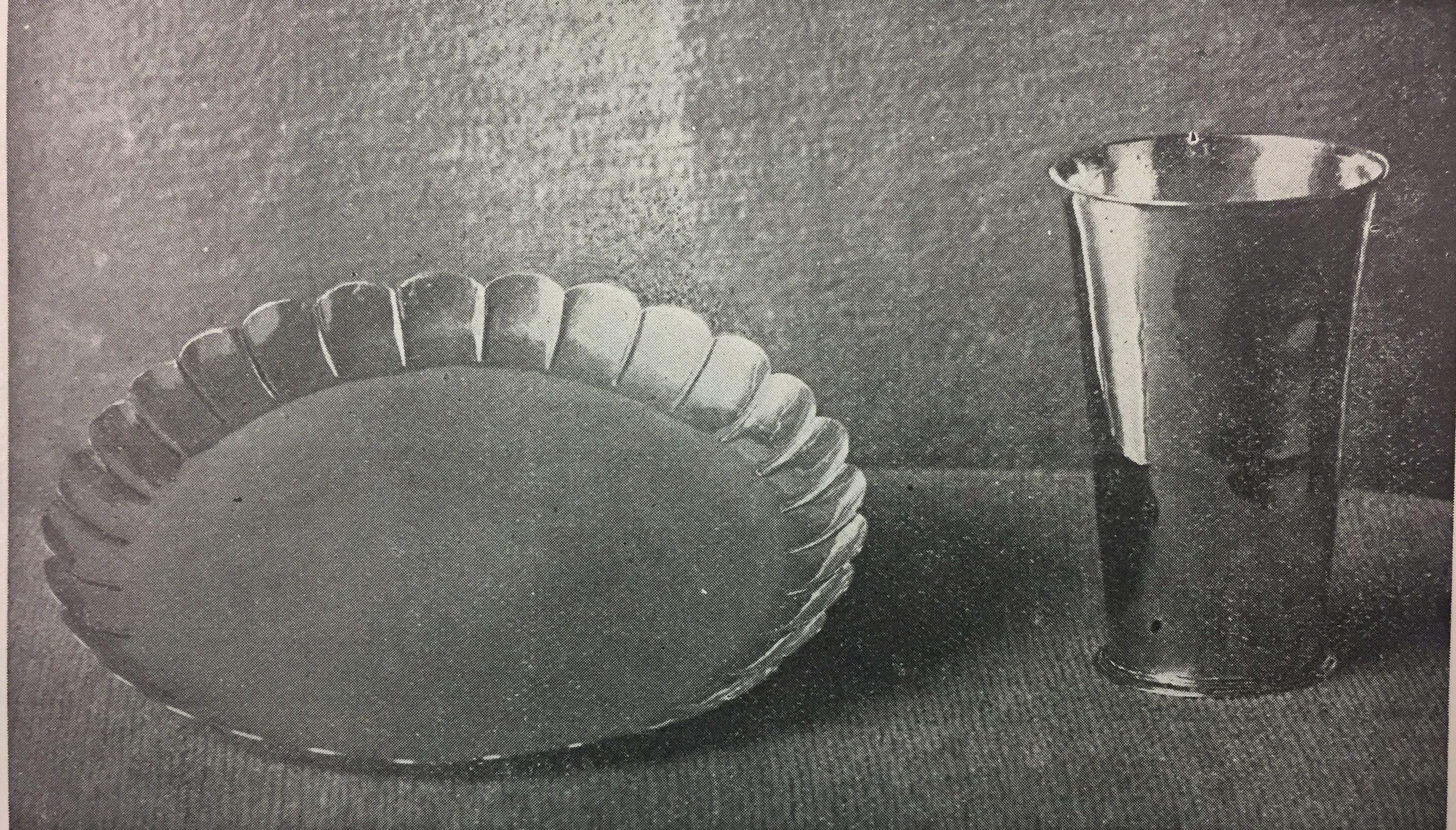
Rev. Roger Aitken gave this chalice and paten to the St. Peter's Anglican Church (1818), King's University Archives

Aitken presented the church with a silver chalice (c.1663) and paten (c.1766) from Aberdeen, Scotland, both of which are in the King's College Chapel, Halifax. The chalice was made by goldsmith Thomas Moncur and the paten made by goldsmith James Gordon, both of Aberdeen. The Chalice is engraved "For the Church of Kearn 1663". The Kearn church is in Aberdeenshire. Later, the chalice and paten were reported to have been given to the Old West Kirk by Lady Irwin of Drum Castle (Lady Drum). Aitken is reported to have received them both while he was at St John's, Aberdeen and then took them to Moose Island for two years (1814–1816) and then to Nova Scotia. The chalice is reported to be the oldest Anglican chalice in Canada. Upon discovering the chalice and paten were being sold in Halifax, Senator William Johnston Almon purchased them and donated them to the King's College Chapel (1891).

== See also ==
- St. John's Anglican Church (Lunenburg)
