= List of listed buildings in Inverurie, Aberdeenshire =

This is a list of listed buildings in the parish of Inverurie in Aberdeenshire, Scotland.

== List ==
Name	Location	Date Listed	Grid Ref. (Note: Sometimes known as OSGB36, the grid reference (where provided) is based on the British national grid reference system used by the Ordnance Survey. • "Guide to National Grid". Ordnance Survey. • "Get-a-map". Ordnance Survey.)	Geo-coordinates	Notes	LB Number (Note: Historic Environment Scotland assign a unique alphanumeric identifier to each designated site in Scotland, for listed buildings this always begins with "LB", for example "LB12345".)	Image
West High Street West Parish Church, Including Boundary Walls				57°17′03″N 2°22′35″W	Category B	45604	Upload Photo
Clydesdale Bank, 1 High Street				57°16′57″N 2°22′25″W	Category B	35393	Upload Photo
Nos 1-12 Crosslett Court, Market Place				57°17′01″N 2°22′25″W	Category C(S)	35400	Upload Photo
100 High Street				57°16′44″N 2°22′16″W	Category B	35396	Upload Photo
106 High Street				57°16′42″N 2°22′15″W	Category B	35397	Upload Photo
Clydesdale Bank, 26 West High Street And 1 Constitution Street				57°17′04″N 2°22′36″W	Category B	35402	Upload Photo
Old Sluice Bridges Over Aberdeen Canal, Canal Road				57°16′25″N 2°22′11″W	Category C(S)	35408	Upload Photo
St. Mary's Episcopal Church, High Street				57°16′40″N 2°22′11″W	Category B	35398	Upload Photo
Inverurie Town Hall, Market Place				57°16′47″N 2°22′20″W	Category B	35399	Upload another image
Old Inverurie Churchyard, (North-Western Part Of Inverurie Cemetery)				57°16′33″N 2°22′00″W	Category B	35405	Upload Photo
Inverurie Hospital, Nurses' Home				57°16′35″N 2°22′43″W	Category B	13321	Upload Photo
Former Workshop, Former Great North Of Scotland Locomotive Works, Harlaw Road				57°17′18″N 2°22′44″W	Category B	49303	Upload Photo
St Andrew's Manse And St.Andrew's Cottage, Glebe Road				57°16′47″N 2°22′40″W	Category B	35392	Upload Photo
Catholic Church Of The Immaculate Conception, Presbytery House And Out-House. 116 North Street				57°17′23″N 2°23′13″W	Category B	35403	Upload Photo
Inverurie Hospital, Administration Block				57°16′36″N 2°22′47″W	Category B	13320	Upload Photo
Manar House				57°16′09″N 2°26′20″W	Category B	9074	Upload Photo
80 High Street				57°16′47″N 2°22′18″W	Category B	35395	Upload Photo
Inverurie Hospital, Gatelodge And Quadrant Walls				57°16′34″N 2°22′47″W	Category B	13322	Upload Photo
Manar Home Farm				57°16′17″N 2°25′48″W	Category B	9075	Upload Photo
Manar Dovecot Manar Policies				57°16′11″N 2°26′20″W	Category B	9077	Upload Photo
Parish Church Of St. Andrew, High Street, (Excluding Halls)				57°16′48″N 2°22′23″W	Category B	35391	Upload Photo
123 North Street				57°17′24″N 2°23′18″W	Category B	35404	Upload Photo
Inverurie Hospital, Double House Fronting Upperboat Road				57°16′36″N 2°22′49″W	Category B	13323	Upload Photo
Inverurie Railway Station				57°17′10″N 2°22′25″W	Category B	46174	Upload Photo
Inverurie War Memorial And Gardens				57°17′02″N 2°22′27″W	Category C(S)	50180	Upload Photo
Kintore Arms Hotel, 83 High Street				57°16′46″N 2°22′21″W	Category B	35394	Upload Photo
Northburn, Port Road				57°17′04″N 2°22′25″W	Category C(S)	35401	Upload Photo
Bridge Over River Urie Near The Bass				57°16′29″N 2°21′43″W	Category B	35407	Upload Photo
Aquahorthies House, Farm Steading And Walled Garden, Including Nethermains Of Aquahorthies				57°16′15″N 2°27′07″W	Category B	12993	Upload Photo
Aquahorthies House				57°16′12″N 2°27′04″W	Category A	9073	Upload another image See more images
Manar Policies, East Gate Lodge Including Gatepier And Gates				57°16′16″N 2°25′25″W	Category B	9076	Upload Photo
Former Carriage And Wagon Shop, Former Great North Of Scotland Locomotive Works, Harlaw Road				57°17′21″N 2°22′42″W	Category B	49301	Upload Photo
Former Manager's Drawing Office, Former Great North Of Scotland Locomotive Works, Harlaw Road				57°17′16″N 2°22′45″W	Category B	49302	Upload Photo
Former Smithy, Furnace And Foundry, Former Great North Of Scotland Locomotive Works, Harlaw Road				57°17′18″N 2°22′39″W	Category B	49304	Upload Photo

== Key ==
The scheme for classifying buildings in Scotland is:

- Category A: "buildings of national or international importance, either architectural or historic; or fine, little-altered examples of some particular period, style or building type."
- Category B: "buildings of regional or more than local importance; or major examples of some particular period, style or building type, which may have been altered."
- Category C: "buildings of local importance; lesser examples of any period, style, or building type, as originally constructed or moderately altered; and simple traditional buildings which group well with other listed buildings."

In March 2016 there were 47,288 listed buildings in Scotland. Of these, 8% were Category A, and 50% were Category B, with the remaining 42% being Category C.

== See also ==
- List of listed buildings in Aberdeenshire
