= Roger Aitken =

19th-century Scottish Anglican priest and missionary

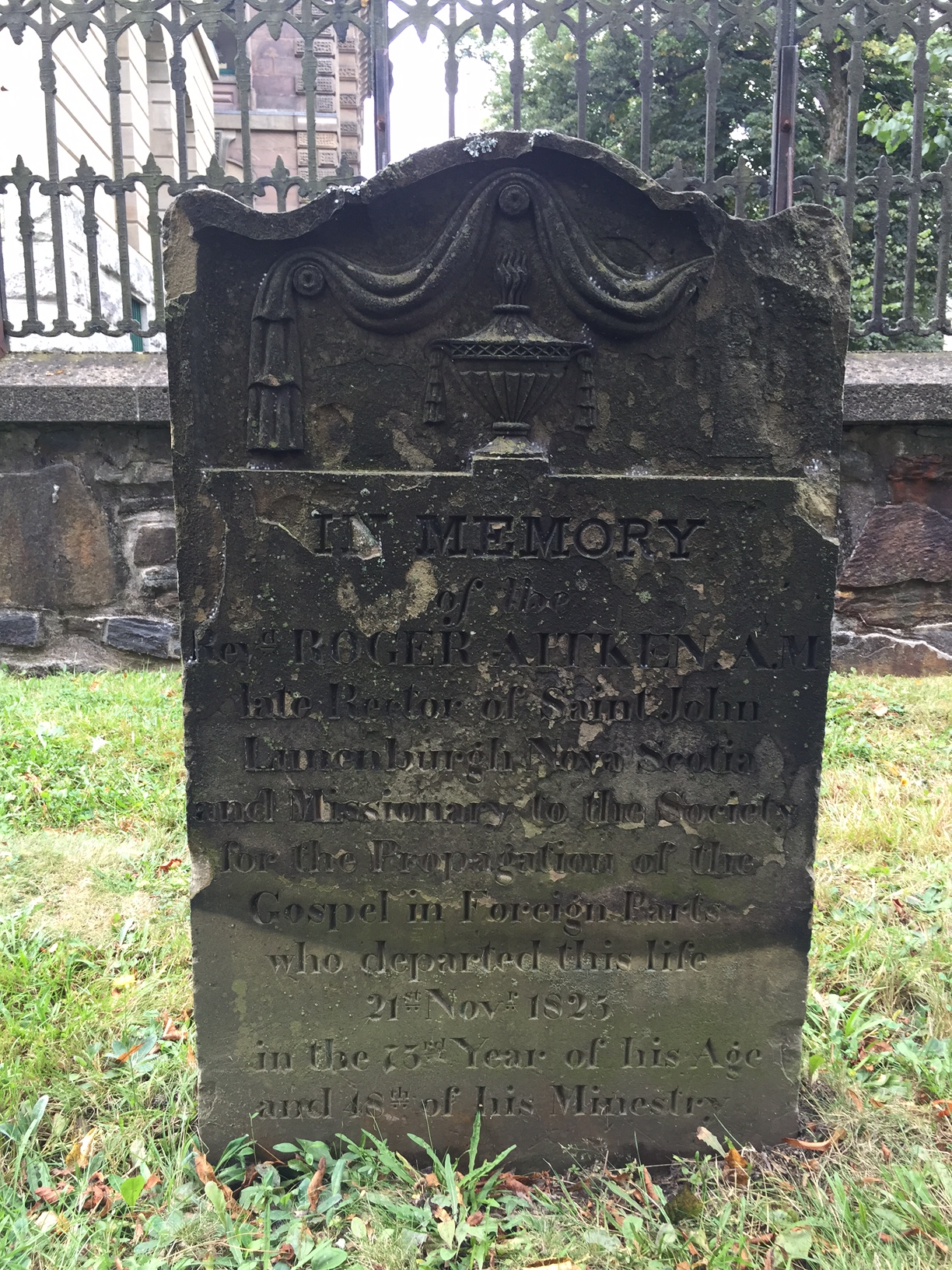
Rev. Roger Aitken (d. 1825), missionary at Lunenburg (1817-1825) for Society for the Propagation of the Gospel in Foreign Parts. Tombstone at Old Burying Ground (Halifax, Nova Scotia)

Roger Aitken (1748, Dumfries, Scotland - 21 November 1825, Halifax, Nova Scotia) was a Scottish Anglican priest known for his service as a missionary at Lunenburg, Nova Scotia (1817-1825) for the Society for the Propagation of the Gospel in Foreign Parts. He was the rector at St. John's Anglican Church and was instrumental in gaining construction of the Rectory and in founding St. Peter's Anglican Church, New Dublin.

Ordained in Scotland by Bishop Robert Kilgour in 1777, Aitken served as the minister at St John's, Aberdeen, 1782-1814. He was assigned to the North American continent after the War of 1812, as garrison chaplain for two years (1814-1816) to the 1,000 British troops at Moose Island, Maine, then considered part of British territory in Lower Canada.

Aitken was reassigned to Halifax and was posted to Lunenburg on 22 June 1817. There he was active in supporting the local school and social services to families. He also worked to establish a local farmers’ market, similar to ones in Halifax and Liverpool. He was instrumental in establishing the St. Peter's Anglican Church, New Dublin (est. 1818), and presenting it with a historic silver chalice (c.1663) and paten (c.1766) from Aberdeen. Both of these pieces of communion silver are currently held in the King’s College Chapel, Halifax. (The chalice is reported to be the oldest Anglican chalice in Canada.)

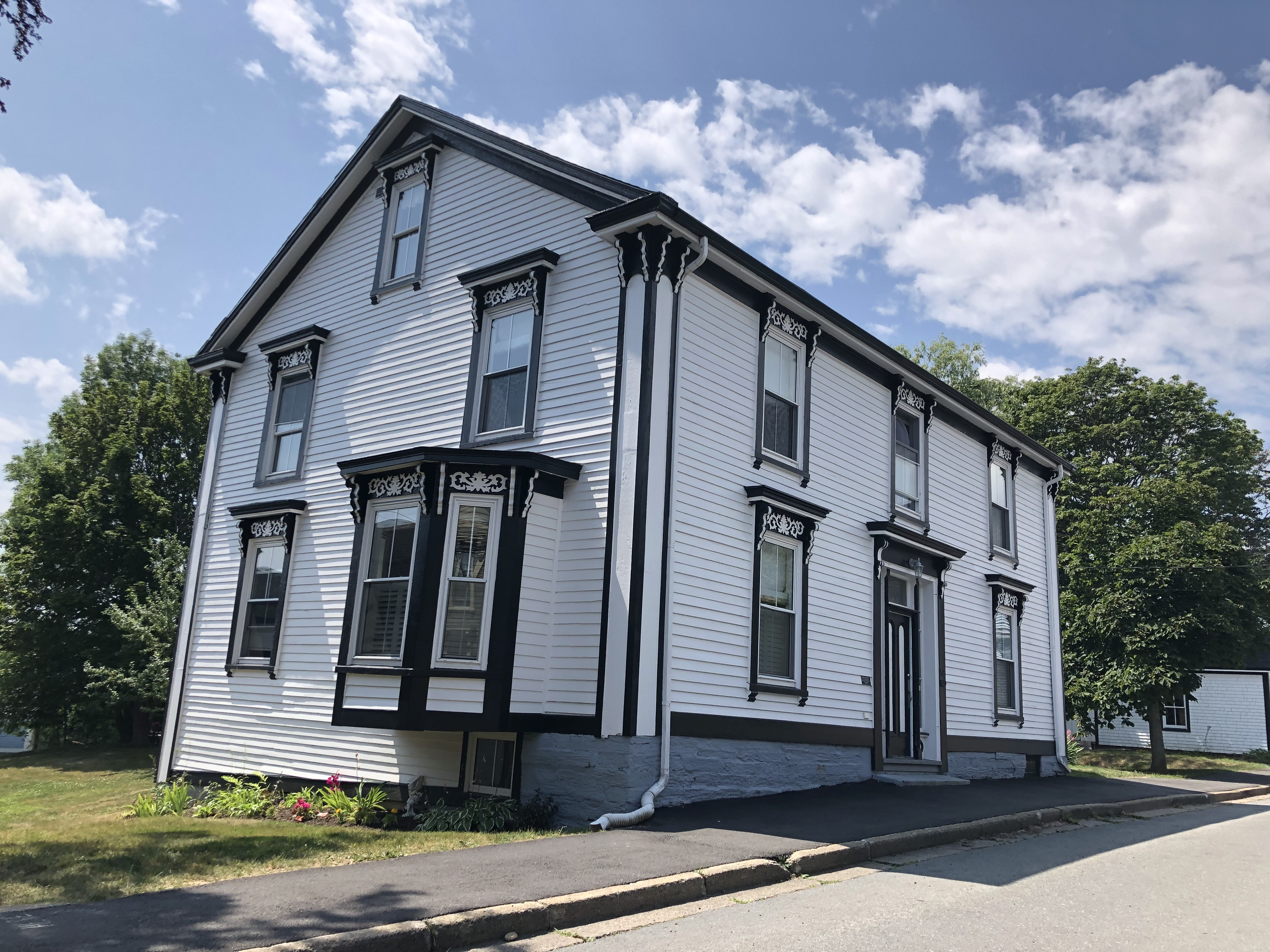
St. John's Anglican Rectory, 58 Townsend Street, Lunenburg, Nova Scotia

When Aitken first arrived in Lunenburg, the village had no Anglican rectory. This situation persisted for most of the eight years he served there. The delays in erecting a residence for the missionary were related to deep divisions in the community. One historian reported that this period was “the most tumultuous eight years in the history of the congregation.”

At one point, some residents of Lunenburg wrote a 14-page petition to the SPG asking for Aitken to be recalled. Aitken responded with at 59-page document defending his service, which one historian said "is an exceptional and important document in terms of the religious history of the community”. During this period, Aitken was strongly opposed by prominent citizens John Creighton Jr. and Francis Joseph Rudolf. While waiting for the rectory to be completed, Aitken developed a farm on the other side of the LaHave River.

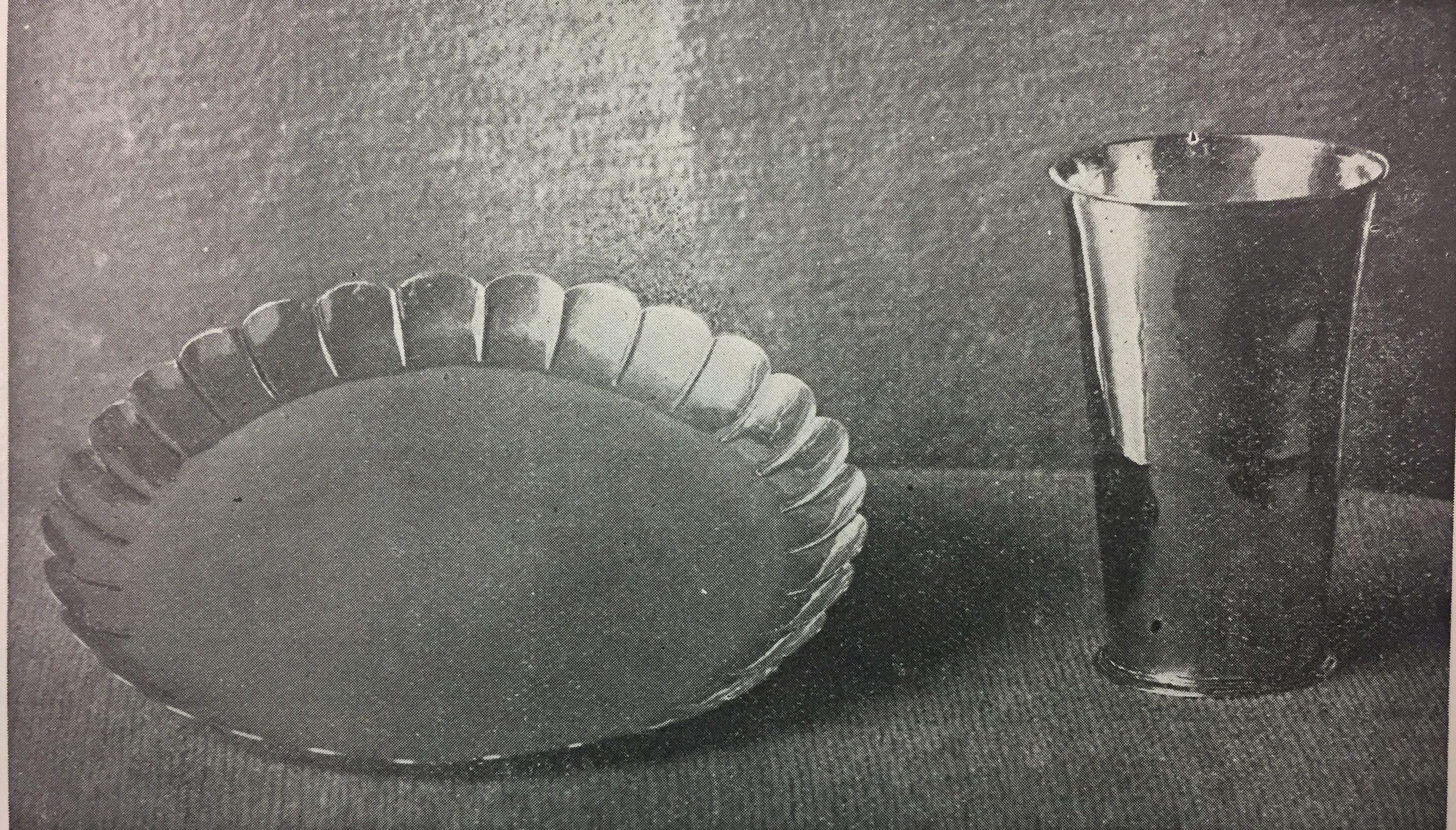
Rev. Roger Aitken gave this chalice and paten to the St. Peter's Anglican Church (West LaHave, Nova Scotia)(1818), King's University Archives

Aitken was eventually vindicated and a rectory was completed. This structure still stands at 58 Townsend Street. Shortly after the rectory was built, Aitken planned to go to England. En route to England, he died in Halifax where he was going to get a ship overseas. He was buried there in the Old Burying Ground.
