= Port Elphinstone railway station =

Disused freight depot in Aberdeenshire, Scotland

Port Elphinstone

General information
- Location: Port Elphinstone, Aberdeenshire; Scotland
- Coordinates: 57.268°N 2.364°W
- Platforms: None

Other information
- Status: Disused

History
- Original company: Great North of Scotland Railway
- Pre-grouping: Great North of Scotland Railway
- Post-grouping: LNER
Location

Port Elphinstone railway station was a freight depot in Port Elphinstone, Aberdeenshire.

| Preceding station | Historical railways | Following station |
|---|---|---|
| Kintore; Line open; station closed | Great North of Scotland Railway; GNoSR Main Line | Inverurie; Line and station open |
