= Aberdeenshire Canal =

Defunct canal in Aberdeenshire, Scotland

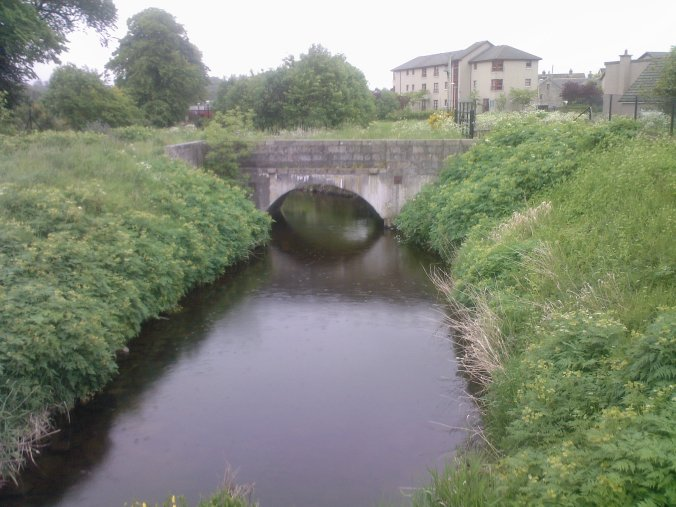
- Possible remains of the canal at Port Elphinstone in 2007
- Interactive map of Aberdeenshire Canal

Specifications
- Maximum boat length: 57 ft 0 in (17.37 m)
- Maximum boat beam: 9 ft 0 in (2.74 m)
- Locks: 17 (level dropped 168 ft)
- Status: Railway built over route

History
- Original owner: Aberdeenshire Canal Navigation Company
- Principal engineer: Robert Whitworth
- Date of act: 1796
- Date of first use: 1805
- Date closed: 1854

Geography
- Start point: Port Elphinstone, Inverurie
- End point: Aberdeen Docks

The Aberdeenshire Canal was a waterway in Aberdeenshire, Scotland, designed by John Rennie, which ran from the port of Aberdeen to Port Elphinstone, Inverurie. It was originally planned to reach Monymusk, but had been truncated by the time an act of Parliament was obtained in 1796. Construction was hampered by a lack of finance, and some local opposition, but it opened in 1805. Some of the workmanship was sub-standard, and several of the locks failed soon afterwards, but they were reconstructed, and reopened in late 1806.

It was used for the carriage of a wide variety of cargo, and passenger services were also introduced. These proved popular, and two boats a day made the journey during the summer months, with one in the winter. They gradually faced competition from the adjacent turnpike road, which was quicker but more expensive. A connecting lock was built in 1834, to enable boats to enter Aberdeen harbour, which eased the problem of transhipping goods to larger vessels. The canal normally closed between December and March each year, due to icing.

It was never a financial success, and the shareholders did not receive any dividends during its life. Negotiations began in 1845 with the Great North of Scotland Railway, who eventually bought it. Contractors working for the railway company drained much of the canal before any money had changed hands, and the breach had to be repaired. The canal was finally closed in early 1854, so that the railway could lay tracks along its course. The line from Kittybrewster to Huntly was completed by September 1854.

As the railway runs straighter than the canal, in some places, clear evidence can be seen for the canal. A scenic walk has been created at Port Elphinstone, part of which follows a channel labelled Old Canal on Ordnance Survey maps, this part thought to be a later lade that served a mill.

== History ==
The canal was originally conceived as part of a bigger scheme to link Aberdeen to Monymusk, via Inverurie, with a branch from Inverurie along the course of the Ury Glen to Insch. Captain George Taylor conducted a survey, which confirmed that the plan was feasible, in 1793, but by the time a subscription list was started, the plans had been truncated, with just the section from Aberdeen to Inverurie remaining. Advertisements appeared in the local press, listing the benefits of the enterprise, which included increasing the value of certain stone quarries and land. By 1795, some £11,000 had been pledged, and a general meeting was held, at which the subscribers decided that work would commence as soon at subscriptions reached £14,000. Notices were placed in the press, encouraging those wanted to see the canal completed to come forward and pledge their support. An act of Parliament, the Aberdeenshire Canal Act 1796 (36 Geo. 3. c. 68) was obtained on 26 April 1796, which created The Company of Proprietors of the Aberdeenshire Canal Navigation, and authorised them to raise £20,000 in £50 shares. No person was permitted to have less than one share or more than 40. If required, they could raise an additional £10,000 either by issuing more shares, or by mortgaging the tolls which would be collected.

John Rennie was engaged as the consulting engineer, with Thomas Fletcher as resident engineer. Contractors were shown the line of the canal in March 1797, and the parliamentary commissioners held meetings to resolve issues between the land owners and the proprietors of the canal. The start of the work was delayed by Rennie's suggestion that the size of the channel should be increased. Meanwhile, land was being advertised in Inverurie, on the assumption that construction of the canal would result in factories and other public works being built. By 1798, the company was advertising for masons to build three locks, and for contractors to cut and puddle some 7 miles (11 km) of the canal bed. Plans for a turnpike road from Inverurie to Aberdeen were passed in 1799, and there was some opposition to the canal construction. A reward of £5 was offered to anyone supplying information which led to the conviction of those who were throwing stones and rubbish into the cut, and generally damaging the works and boats. Offenders were warned that if caught, they could face transportation for 7 years.

Aberdeenshire Canal Act 1801
- Act of Parliament
- Parliament of the United Kingdom
- Long title: An act for better enabling the company of proprietors of the Aberdeenshire canal navigation to complete the same.
- Citation: 41 Geo. 3. (U.K.) c. iii
- Territorial extent: United Kingdom

Dates
- Royal assent: 24 March 1801
- Commencement: 24 March 1801 (Note: The Acts of Parliament (Commencement) Act 1793.)
Other legislation
Relates to	Aberdeenshire Canal Act 1796; Aberdeenshire Canal Navigation Act 1809

Status: Current legislation

By 1800, Fletcher was worried that he might lose his job, as a result of the shortage of funds and the levels of compensation paid to landowners. He therefore asked Rennie if he could move on, and in 1801 obtained a post as Superintendent for the construction of Union Bridge in Aberdeen. The project was facing severe financial difficulty and another bill was submitted to Parliament. In the resulting act of Parliament, the Aberdeenshire Canal Act 1801 (41 Geo. 3. (U.K.) c. iii), dated 24 March 1801, the company noted that of the £20,000 authorised by the previous act, only £17,800 had been subscribed. They obtained powers to raise another £20,000, in £20 shares, on which interest at five per cent would be paid. The preamble to the act of Parliament stated that much of the canal had been completed, but that the company had tried and failed to raise any more money. Interest on the new shares would be paid once receipts from the tolls allowed, and the full five per cent would be paid before any returns were made against the original shares. The company hoped to sell the new shares to the existing shareholders, but not all of them were keen to expand their holdings. A public sale of shares in September 1801 raised £11,421.

The proprietors were faced with regular complaints by the workmen that they were being obstructed in their work by detractors. In an effort to resolve this, the company reminded the public of the many benefits that the canal would bring. They advertised for contractors to complete the final section down to the harbour in February 1803, but in March were meeting to discuss how this might be funded, as they were again short of funds. There were ongoing issues with compensation to landowners, and in 1804 the company decided to lease the tolls for the first three years of operation. William Kennedy was granted the lease, and the arrangement raised £10,000 as a mortgage. The main material into which the canal was cut was granite, some of which was quarried and transported to London.

=== Opening ===
Aberdeenshire Canal Navigation Act 1809
- Act of Parliament
- Parliament of the United Kingdom
- Long title: An Act for better enabling the Company of Proprietors of the Aberdeenshire Canal Navigation to raise the necessary Fund to complete the same.
- Citation: 49 Geo. 3. c. iii
- Territorial extent: United Kingdom

Dates
- Royal assent: 13 March 1809
- Commencement: 13 March 1809
Other legislation
Relates to	Aberdeenshire Canal Act 1796; Aberdeenshire Canal Navigation Act 1801

Status: Current legislation

Text of statute as originally enacted

The canal eventually opened in early June 1805. The committee of management met at Inverurie, where they were congratulated on completing the task by the provost, magistrates, minister and others. They set off in the barge The Countess of Kintore, suitably decorated for the occasion, and travelled to Kintore, where they were met by the magistrates and other inhabitants. Several groups of ladies joined them as they approached Aberdeen, and travelled through the locks. Crowds gathered on the banks, and refreshments were served on the boat. The band of the Stirlingshire Militia accompanied them for the final few miles. After seven and a half hours, they reached the terminal basin next to the docks, and retired to the New Inn for dinner and toasts. Fourteen of the locks failed within the first few months, and reconstruction of the masonry resulted in the canal being shut until October 1806. The engineer Thomas Telford approved the substantial reconstruction. A third act of Parliament, the Aberdeenshire Canal Navigation Act 1809 (49 Geo. 3. c. iii) was passed on 13 March 1809, which enabled the company to raise a further £45,000 for work on the canal, but it seems probable that its powers were never used.

The canal ran up the strath of the River Don from Aberdeen for a total of 18.25 miles (29.4 km) to a terminus just south of Inverurie. The terminus area came to be known as Port Elphinstone after Sir James Elphinstone, who was a keen supporter and financier of the canal. He lived nearby at Logie House near Oyne and Pitcaple. The canal had 17 locks, all in the first 4 miles (6.4 km) between Aberdeen harbour and Stoneywood, together with 56 road bridges, 20 culverts and five aqueducts. From Stoneywood it ran level to Port Elphinstone and was used to carry both freight and passenger boats. Passengers were only carried on the top section, and disembarked at a building called the Boathouse, situated above the five St Machar Drive locks. The fall from Stoneywood to the low water mark at Aberdeen was 168 feet (51 m). As originally built, it was about 17 feet (5.2 m) wide and 3 feet (0.91 m) deep. John Rennie suggested it should be 27 feet (8.2 m) wide and 4 feet (1.2 m) deep, and although it was enlarged in the first six years, it was only increased to 23 feet (7.0 m) wide and 3 feet 9 inches (1.14 m) deep.

=== Operation ===
The original act of Parliament had specified the maximum tolls that could be charged, ranging from 4 pence per ton per mile for hay, straw, dung peat and materials intended to be used as manure of for roadbuilding, 5 pence for corn, flour, coal, coke, iron, lime and most building materials, to 6 pence for timber, manufactured goods and anything not covered by the previous lists. The company could also charge "reasonable tolls" for any goods that were left on their wharfs for more than 48 hours. The actual rates charged were considerably less than the specified rates, being 1.5, 2 and 2.25 pence for the three categories. From July 1807, passengers were charged 2 shillings for the journey from Aberdeen to Kintore or Inverurie, and 2 pence per mile for shorter journeys. The passenger boats left Aberdeen in the morning and returned later in the day, running three days per week. In September 1808, they started running every day, and there were three rates for various classes. Thus passengers in the fore cabin paid 2s 6d, those in the after cabin paid 1s 6d, and those who travelled outside were charged 1s.

The canal created many benefits for the local community. Passenger boats ran twice daily during the summer months, but from 1816, some of their traffic was taken by coaches running on the turnpike road, which were quicker but more expensive. With easier transport, quarries near Kintore were able to obtain a contract to supply 700,000 cubic feet (20,000 m^{3}) of granite for a major project at Sheerness. The Farmer Lime Company ensured that there were supplies of lime and coal available at Inverurie and Kintore, and a covered barge was obtained to improve the shipment of grain. Granaries were erected beside the canal at Inverurie. Inverurie prospered, with its population rising from around 500 when construction of the canal started, to 2,020 in 1841. Kintore, which was the principal depot for the canal, showed a more modest increase, from 863 in 1811 to 1,299 in 1841. There were other benefits about which the company were less happy. They issued warnings to try to prevent the banks of the canal being damaged by people driving cattle to water, and using the banks for washing with tubs. More tragically, there were a number of cases where unwanted newborn babies were drowned in the canal.

There was initially no direct connection to the Aberdeen docks, which made transshipment difficult, and it was not until 1834 that a sea lock was constructed, enabling boats to enter the docks at certain states of the tide. The work was funded by those who held mortgages agreeing to forgo their dividends for a period, and the total cost was around £1,500. The weather also created problems, with the canal normally being shut between December and March due to icing.

The canal was never a financial success. It had cost nearly £44,000 to build, and revenues rose from £311 in 1807, the first full year of operation, to just £3062 in 1853, the last full year of operation.

=== Conversion to a railway ===
Plans for a railway from the south to Aberdeen were announced in 1844, and later that year, there were proposals to continue the line northwards, to reach Inverness. This would be called the Great North of Scotland Railway, and in 1845, they approached the canal company, to explore whether they could buy the canal and use it for their track bed. The canal had received £1,659 from tolls in 1844, and the passenger boats had made a profit of £200. The company predicted that revenues for 1845 would be around £200 higher than in 1844. Although the railway looked at an alternative plan, with the railway some distance from the canal, this was not needed, as their offer of £36,000 was accepted. The railway would inherit the privileges and liabilities of the canal company, and would therefore compensate several companies who had built granaries, sheds and wharfs to enable them to trade on the canal. The £36,000 was to be transferred on 1 April 1848, but the railway company were unable to complete the transaction, due to the state of the money market. The canal company agreed to the delay, but began adding interest at 5.5 per cent to the capital sum.

The line would be single track, and the construction costs, which included the cost of the canal, were very favourable compared to other lines. In 1852, construction began at Port Elphinstone, westwards towards Huntly. This ensured that the canal could remain open for as long as possible. Despite the fact that the canal had not yet been bought by the railway, the contractors Erskine and Carstairs cut through the bank at Kintore, and drained the entire upper section from Port Elphinstone to Stoneybank. With the barges grounded, the canal company complained, and the bank was hastily repaired and the canal refilled. Some of the proprietors of the canal agreed to take railway shares in lieu of compensation for their canal shares, and the railway made an interim payment of £20,000, from which claims would be paid to the bondholders and shareholders. In February 1854, the canal company had received £39,272 from the railway, representing the original purchase price plus the interest. In 1848, the mortgage debt and the interest on it was around £18,600. The shareholders had never received any dividends, and thus were unlikely to recover the capital they had invested. The money was distributed without any distinction to holders of the old £50 shares and the new £20 shares.

The canal was closed in early 1854 so that railway tracks could be laid along much of its length. The railway opened in September of that year. Sir J. D. H. Elphinstone, Sir Andrew Leith Hay and various other people rode in a special train, consisting of an engine and two carriages, from Kittybrewster, in Aberdeen, to Huntly, and found the entire line to be in good order. An official opening took place several days later, and the Aberdeen Journal described the route, mentioning the importance of Port Elphinestone as a centre for trade, caused by its former position as the terminus of the canal.

== The canal today ==
Designations

Scheduled monument
- Official name: Aberdeenshire Canal, remains of, NW of Brae of Kintore
- Type: Industrial: inland water; milestone, guide plate, direction post
- Designated: 23 February 1998
- Reference no.: SM7674

Scheduled monument
- Official name: Aberdeenshire Canal, remains of, S of Dalwearie
- Type: Industrial: inland water
- Designated: 10 March 1998
- Reference no.: SM7675

Scheduled monument
- Official name: Aberdeenshire Canal, remains of, Beidleston to Woodland's Wood
- Type: Industrial: inland water
- Designated: 20 December 1999
- Reference no.: SM8421

Scheduled monument
- Official name: Aberdeenshire Canal, remains of, N and E of Tillybrig Cottage, Dyce
- Type: Industrial: inland water
- Designated: 7 January 1998
- Reference no.: SM7583

Scheduled monument
- Official name: Aberdeenshire Canal, remains of, Station Road, Woodside, Aberdeen
- Type: Industrial: bridge, viaduct, aqueduct; inland water
- Designated: 30 October 2002
- Reference no.: SM10424

Some fragments of the original canal construction may be discerned along the route of the railway. Within Aberdeen these include where the railway runs parallel to Elmbank Terrace, Kittybrewster (at the foot of which road is an elderly bridge carrying the road diagonally over the railway), and again where the railway runs parallel to Great Northern Road in Woodside. Dyce and Dalwearie also have obvious remains. Woodside still has a canal bridge which is in use for the road only with nothing now running underneath; the railway is slightly to the north at this point. It was once well outside the bounds of the city proper, and so both that area and Old Aberdeen still boast roads named Canal Street, which sometimes leads to confusion.

The original canal structure can be seen alongside the Ruschlach road to the south of Kintore. Canal milestones remain at Bridgend House (formerly the Bridgealehouse serving the canal) at the north of Kintore, and at Brae Farm at the south of Kintore.

At Port Elphinstone, by Inverurie, there is a short section of open water, about 1 mile (1.6 km) in length, and a circular walkway has been created at the northern end. The footpath continues along the west bank of the channel until the end of the watered section at the site of the old Inverurie Paper Mill, where it drains into the River Don. Although this is labelled Old Canal on maps published by the Ordnance Survey, Graham contended that it was only a lade supplying water to Tait and Son's mill, as he thought it was a new section built after the closure of the canal rather than a refurbishment of the existing canal. Pearson however quotes evidence that the lade was originally part of the canal: being shown as such in estate plans dated 1810, in canal and railway plans of the 1840s, and in maps produced after the closure of the canal. Also the structure of the lade, seen when drained, is consistent with that for a canal with the towpath along the eastern bank.

30 feet of the Canal at Port Elphinstone was blocked with rubble and fenced-off when a four year-old boy died after falling through ice on the canal on a freezing February night in 2003. Following Storm Frank in December 2015, the canal flooded and filled with silt and debris. In a remediation programme as advised by the Scottish Environment Protection Agency (SEPA), the operators have blocked off the west arm of the northern part of the remaining canal at the River Don, in order to flush out the newer east arm of the canal.

== Points of interest ==
Point	Coordinates (Links to map resources)	OS Grid Ref	Notes
Port Elphinstone Basin	57.2741°N 2.3697°W	NJ778204	
Railway over canal bed	57.2546°N 2.3604°W	NJ783182	
Kintore (wharf)	57.2375°N 2.3441°W	NJ793163	
Kinaldie	57.2282°N 2.2789°W	NJ832153	
Remains of canal	57.2298°N 2.2439°W	NJ853154	
Pitmedden	57.2254°N 2.2264°W	NJ864149	
Route through Dyce	57.2009°N 2.1781°W	NJ893122	
Woodside	57.1731°N 2.1372°W	NJ918091	
Kittybrewster	57.1634°N 2.1132°W	NJ932080	
Canal Street Aberdeen	57.1557°N 2.1005°W	NJ940072	
Aberdeen Tidal Harbour	57.1420°N 2.0766°W	NJ954056	

== See also ==
- Canals of Great Britain
- History of the British canal system
- Waterscape

== Bibliography ==
- Davidson, Rev John (1878). Inverurie and the Earldom of the Garioch. Kessinger Publishing. ISBN 978-1-162-12632-6. (reprinted 2010)
- Dingwall, Blair (3 November 2016). "Fresh flood fears after landowner fills in historic Aberdeenshire canal". The Press and Journal. Archived from the original on 30 November 2018.
- Graham, Angus (1969). Two Canals in Aberdeenshire (PDF). Proceedings of the Society of Antiquaries, Scotland (published privately). Archived (PDF) from the original on 13 January 2012.
- Lindsay, Jean (1968). The Canals of Scotland. Newton Abbott: David & Charles. ISBN 978-0-7153-4240-4.
- Priestley, Joseph (1831). "Historical Account of the Navigable Rivers, Canals, and Railways, of Great Britain". Archived from the original on 11 March 2016.
- Skempton, Sir Alec; et al. (2002). A Biographical Dictionary of Civil Engineers in Great Britain and Ireland: Vol 1: 1500 to 1830. Thomas Telford. ISBN 978-0-7277-2939-2.
