= JG Ross =

Bakery chain in Scotland

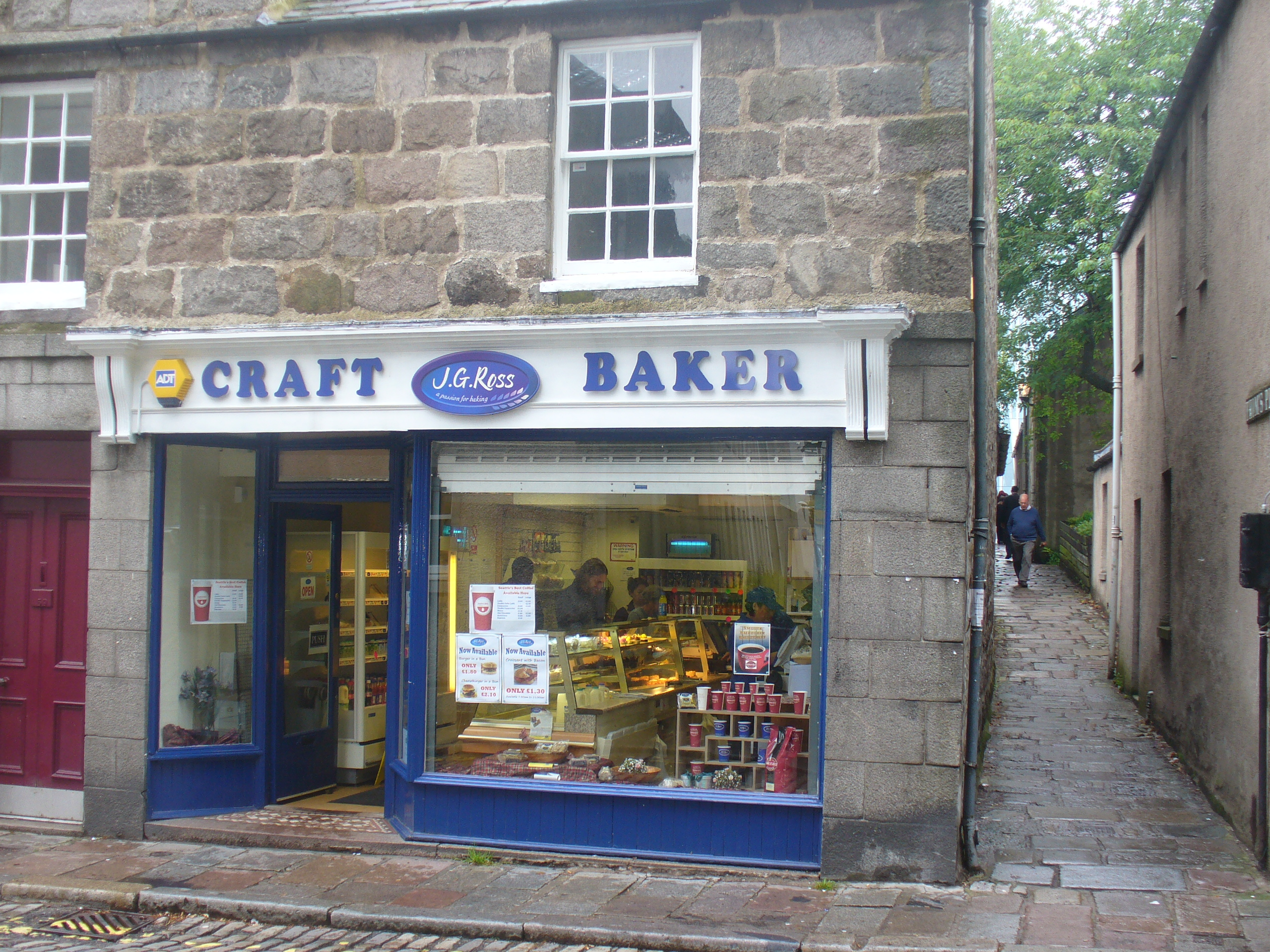
JG Ross outlet in the University of Aberdeen campus

JG Ross is a chain of bakeries based in Inverurie, Aberdeenshire.

As of February 2020, the business has 19 outlets. The most northerly is in Forres, the most southerly is in Dundee, and the furthest west is in Braemar.

== History ==
The business was started in 1962 when J George Ross and his wife took over a bakery in Premnay. To allow for continued expansion, the business acquired a disused facility in Port Elphinstone, Inverurie in 1974 and subsequently relocated.

== Products ==
JG Ross sells its products in its own stores and packaged in supermarkets and other shops. The company is known for its butteries and macaroni pies.
