= St John's, Aberdeen =

St John's Church, Aberdeen
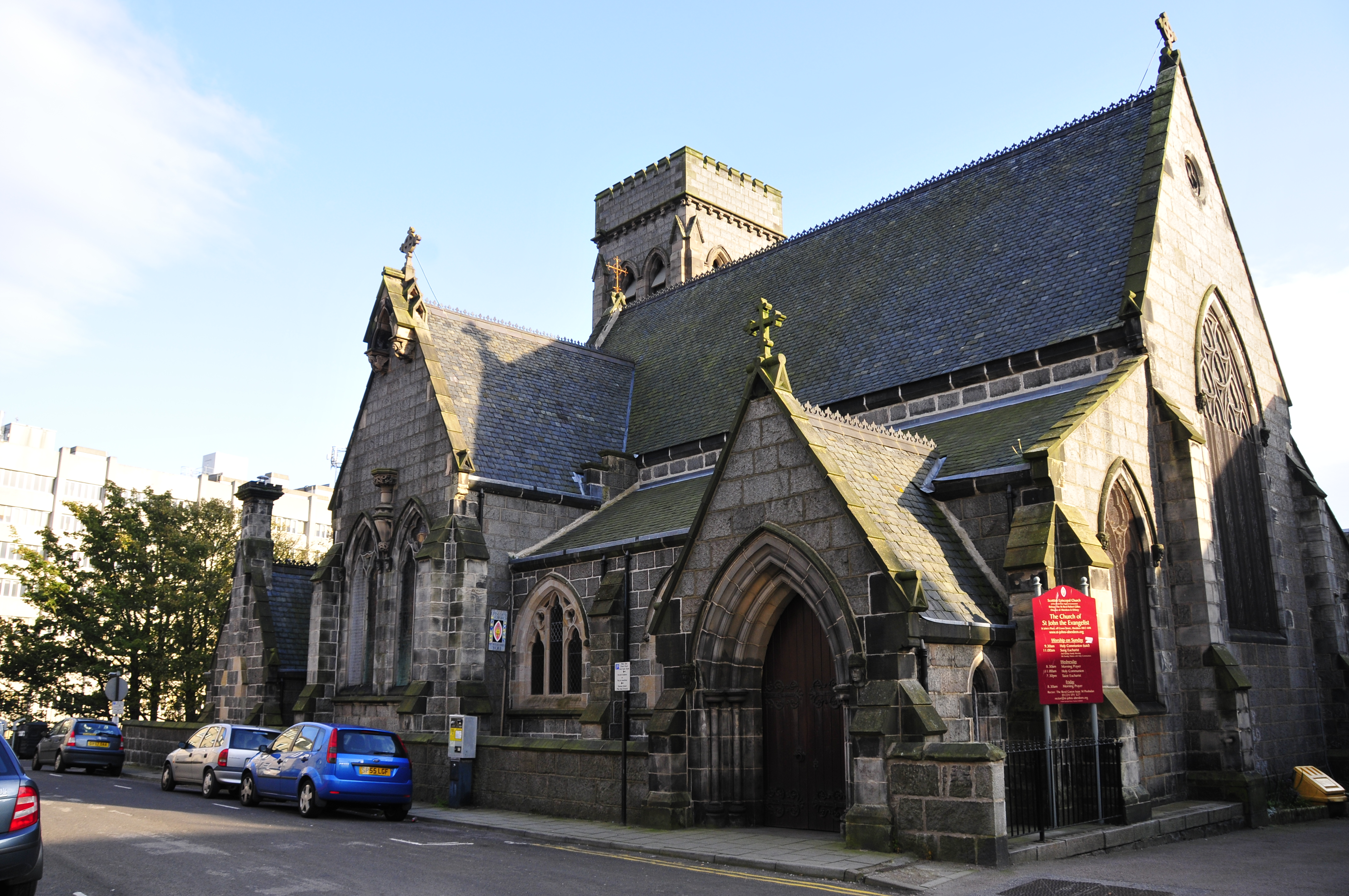
- The Church of St John the Evangelist
- St John's Church, Aberdeen
- 57.143324°N 2.101135°W
- Location: Crown Street, Aberdeen
- Country: Scotland
- Denomination: Scottish Episcopal Church
- Website: https://www.stjohnsaberdeen.co.uk/

History
- Status: Parish church
- Dedication: St John the Evangelist
- Consecrated: 6 May 1851

Architecture
- Functional status: Active
- Architect(s): Matthew and Mackenzie
- Architectural type: Church
- Style: Gothic Revival
- Groundbreaking: 20 November 1849

Specifications
- Materials: Granite with Burntisland stone dressings

Administration
- Diocese: Aberdeen & Orkney

St John the Evangelist — also known as St John's — off Crown Street is a Scottish Episcopal Church in Aberdeen, Scotland.

== History ==
The Episcopal congregation in Aberdeen that became St John's Church began when the Kirk of St Nicholas ejected Rev Dr George Garden in 1693 for refusing to conform to the Presbyterian Establishment. After a spell in exile, he returned to Aberdeen by 1720 and gathered around him the remnants of his flock.

Over the next 130 years, the congregation met in several houses and a larger building in Golden Square, dedicated to St John the Evangelist.

Andrew Gerard who served as the Bishop of Aberdeen from 1746 to 1767. was curate at St John's from 1728, then incumbent from 1733 to 1767. Roger Aitken was minister at St John's, 1782–1814, before serving in Canada.

== Present church ==
During the long incumbency of Rev. Patrick Cheyne, a new building off Crown Street, was built to the designs of Mackenzie and Matthews, 1849–51. It was consecrated by the Primus of the Scottish Episcopal Church, Bishop William Skinner and opened for worship on 6 May 1851. The congregation has worshipped there continuously since. The church is now listed as Category B by Historic Environment Scotland.

Cheyne was prosecuted in 1858 by Bishop Thomas Suther for his Tractarian "Six Sermons" on the Eucharist. His successor, the Rev. Frederick G Lee soon resigned to found a new congregation, St Mary's Carden Place, and the Patrons, Dr George Grub and Dr George Ogilvie beseeched John Comper to come to Aberdeen in 1861.

During the first years of Comper's incumbency a day school was built, dedicated to Cheyne's forty years association with St John's, then in the year 1863 the first sister arrived from the Society of Saint Margaret, the foundress of St Margaret's Convent, 17 Spital, Aberdeen.

Comper resigned the charge at St John's in 1870 to spend more time in his new mission located in the Gallowgate slums of Aberdeen (now St Margaret of Scotland, Aberdeen). The reredos of St John's was designed by Sir Ninian Comper in memory of his parents.

In 2013 the church became the first in Scotland to invite Muslims to share its building as the neighbouring mosque was so small that some were forced to worship outside.

== Font ==
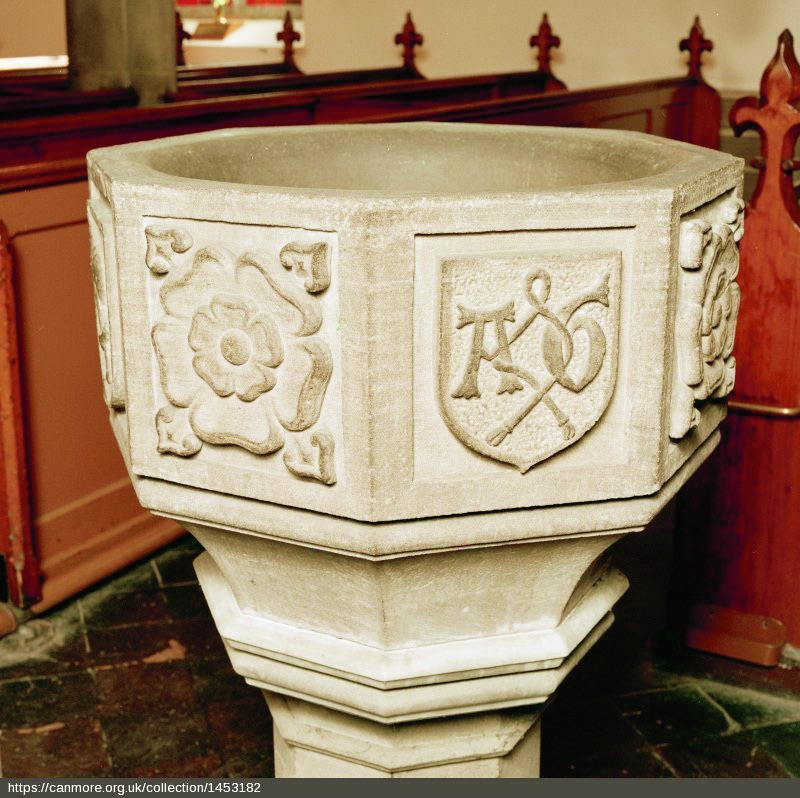
The font

The pre-Reformation stone baptismal font came from the ruined church at Kinkell near Inverurie. Alexander Galloway was the rector of Kinkell from 1516 until his death in 1552 and the font bears his initials on the West panel. The bowl is octagonal with sunken panels on each face. The bowl sits on a pedestal which was designed by the Aberdeen architect James Mitchell who provided the setting in 1851 when it was installed in St John's.

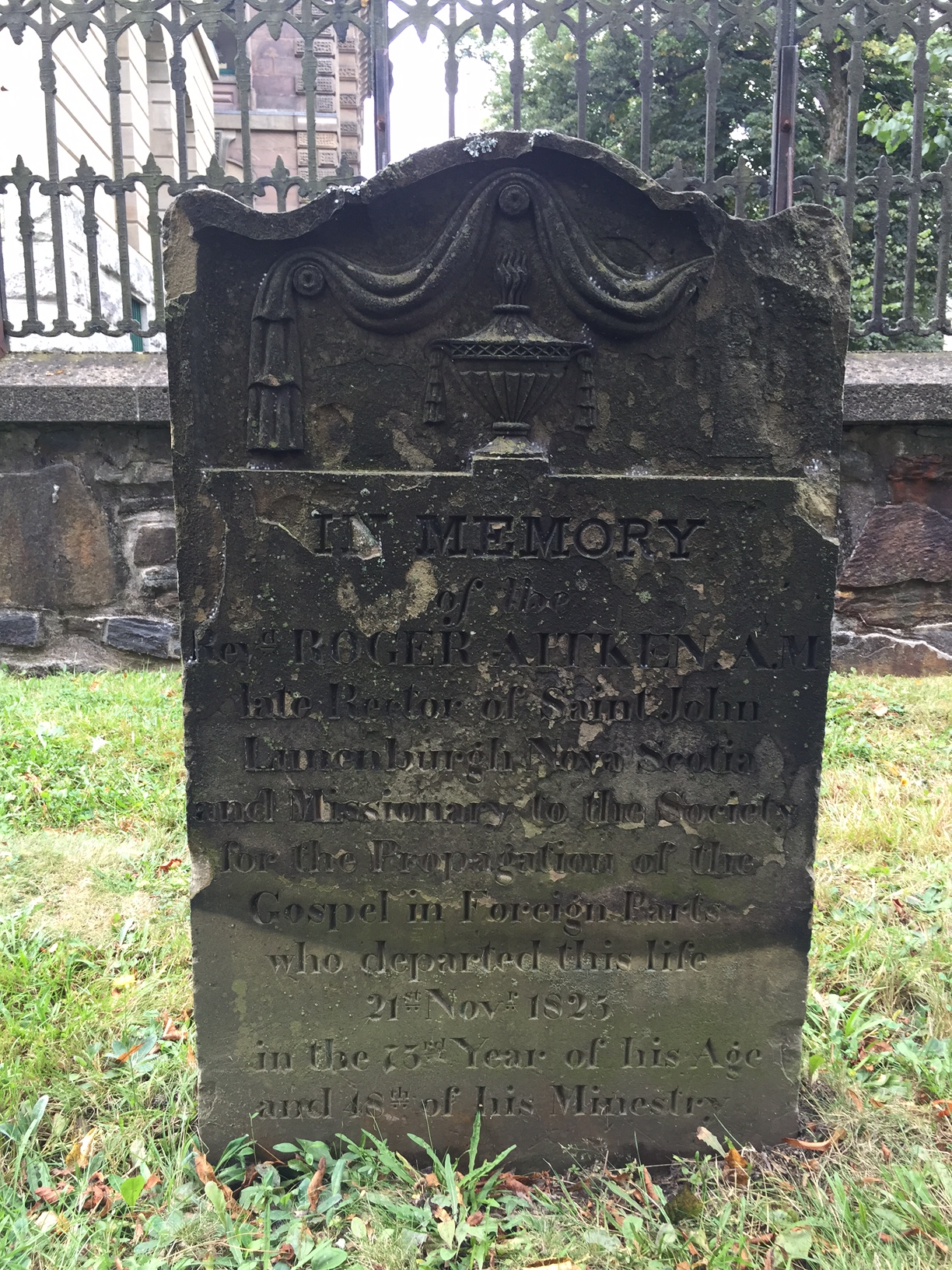
Grave of Rev. Roger Aitken, minister at St John's, 1782–1814, in the Old Burying Ground (Halifax, Nova Scotia)
