= Battle of Inverurie =

The Battle of Inverurie may refer to:

- The Battle of Inverurie (1308), a battle during the Wars of Scottish Independence
- The Battle of Inverurie (1745), a battle during the Jacobite Uprisings in Scotland
