= Inverurie Town Hall =

Municipal building in Inverurie, Scotland

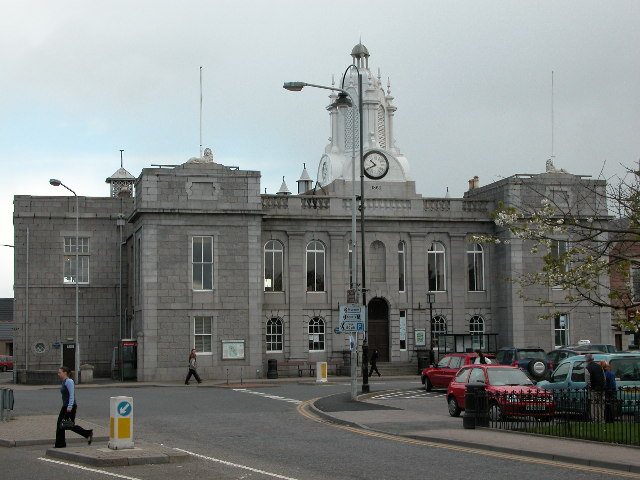
- Inverurie Town Hall

- Shown in Aberdeenshire
- 57.2845°N 2.3744°W
- Location: Market Place, Inverurie

History
- Built: 1863

Site notes
- Architect: John Russell Mackenzie
- Architectural style: Baroque style

Listed Building – Category B
- Official name: Inverurie Town Hall, Market Place
- Designated: 16 April 1971
- Reference no.: LB35399

Inverurie Town Hall is a municipal building in the Market Place in Inverurie, Scotland. The structure, which served as the meeting place of Inverurie Burgh Council, is a Category B listed building.

== History ==
The first municipal building in the town was a tolbooth erected in 1660: it was a two-storey building, with a prison the ground floor and a council chamber on the first floor, which was remodelled in the early 19th century. In the mid-19th century the burgh leaders decided to demolish the old building and to erect a new structure on the same site.

The new building was designed by John Russell Mackenzie in the Baroque style, built in grey granite and was officially opened on 9 July 1863. The design involved a symmetrical main frontage with seven bays facing onto the Market Place with the end bays projected forward; the central section of five bays featured, in the middle bay, a round headed door with a fanlight on the ground floor and a niche on the first floor. The other bays in the central section were fenestrated with short round headed windows on the ground floor and tall round headed windows on the first floor, and the bays in that section were all flanked by full-height Doric order pilasters. At roof level, the central section was surmounted by a balustrade while the end bays were surmounted with sculptures of lions placed on a blocking course. There was also an elaborate central cupola which incorporated a bell which had been manufactured by John C. Wilson of the Gorbals Brass and Bell Foundry in Glasgow.

In 1882, the missionary and cyclist, Ion Keith-Falconer, gave a lecture in the building about his recent bike ride from Land's End to John o' Groats, the length of Britain, in 13 days, and, in 1911, the building was extended to the west to a design by Harbourne Maclennan to accommodate a Carnegie library in a change which unbalanced the careful symmetry of the original design. The building was badly damaged in a fire in 1929, but was restored to a design by George Gray the following year. During the Second World War, air raid warnings were given using a siren in the town hall.

The building continued to serve as the headquarters of the burgh council for much of the 20th century and briefly continued to serve as the meeting place of the enlarged Gordon District Council after it was formed in 1975. However, the new district council moved its officers and their departments to Gordon House on Blackhall Road in 1982. The town hall was the venue, in 1999, at which the 12 year old future singer and songwriter, Emeli Sandé, attended an audition which had been organised by the new unitary authority, Aberdeenshire Council, to identify future music talent.

== See also ==
- List of listed buildings in Inverurie, Aberdeenshire
