= Inverurie =

Town in northeast Scotland

Coordinates: 57°17′03″N 2°22′29″W

Inverurie: Scottish Gaelic: Inbhir Uraidh
- Town
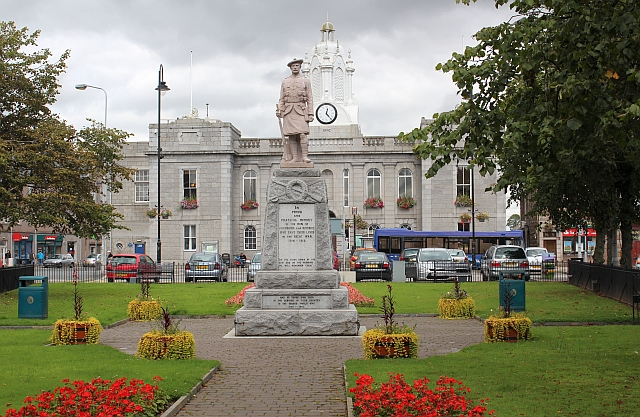
- Inverurie Town Hall and War Memorial

- Location within Aberdeenshire
- Population: 15,106 (2022)
- OS grid reference: NJ7721
  - Edinburgh: 97 mi (156 km)
  - London: 409 mi (658 km)
- Council area: Aberdeenshire
- Lieutenancy area: Aberdeenshire
- Country: Scotland
- Sovereign state: United Kingdom
- Post town: INVERURIE
- Postcode district: AB51
- Dialling code: 01467
- Police: Scotland
- Fire: Scottish
- Ambulance: Scottish
- UK Parliament: Gordon and Buchan
- Scottish Parliament: Aberdeenshire East

Inverurie (/ɪn.vəˈrʊəri/ in-və-ROO-ree; Scottish Gaelic: Inbhir Uraidh or Inbhir Uaraidh, "mouth of the River Ury") is a market town in Aberdeenshire, Scotland at the confluence of the rivers Ury and Don, about 16 miles (26 km) north-west of Aberdeen. It had a population of 15,106 in 2022.

== Geography ==
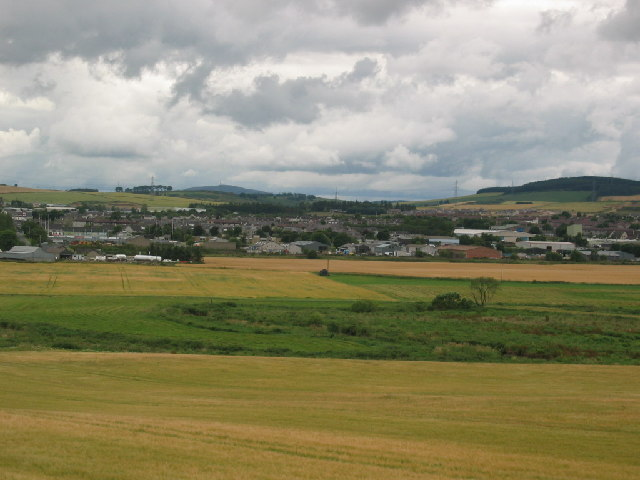
Fields around Inverurie

Inverurie is in the strath of the River Don at the centre of Aberdeenshire and is known locally as the Heart of the Garioch. It sits between the River Don and the River Ury and is 10 miles (16 km) from the imposing hill of Bennachie. The town centre is triangular and is dominated by Inverurie Town Hall built in 1863. In the middle of the 'square' (as it is known locally) is the Inverurie and District War Memorial, capped by a lone Gordon Highlander looking out over the town. The main shopping areas include the Market Place and West High Street which branches off from the centre towards the more residential part of the town. South of the River Don is the village of Port Elphinstone, which is part of the Royal Burgh of Inverurie and is so called due to the proximity of the former Aberdeenshire Canal which ran from Inverurie to Aberdeen.

== Etymology ==
The word "Inverurie" comes from the Scottish Gaelic Inbhir Uraidh meaning 'confluence of the Ury' after the river which joins the Don just south of the town. In the 19th century, with the increased use of the postal service, many letters addressed to Inverury were being sent to "Inverary" in Argyll, on the west coast of Scotland. The town council ordained that the name to be used for council business should be "Inverurie" which they also regarded as being the "ancient spelling". They asked the public to use this spelling in future and said that the Postmaster General had accepted the change. The town clerk made the official announcement on 20 April 1866.

== Prehistory ==
Excavations by archaeologists in summer 2018 at the Thainstone Business Park discovered the remains of:

- a Scottish Middle Bronze Age (1550–1150 BC) roundhouse and an urned cremation cemetery;
- evidence of Scottish Late Bronze Age (1150–800 BC) cremation practices; and
- an Iron Age roundhouse and souterrain from the 1st/2nd centuries AD,

indicating human occupation in the area for thousands of years. An earlier excavation, in 2002, had uncovered the remains of another Iron Age roundhouse.

== History ==
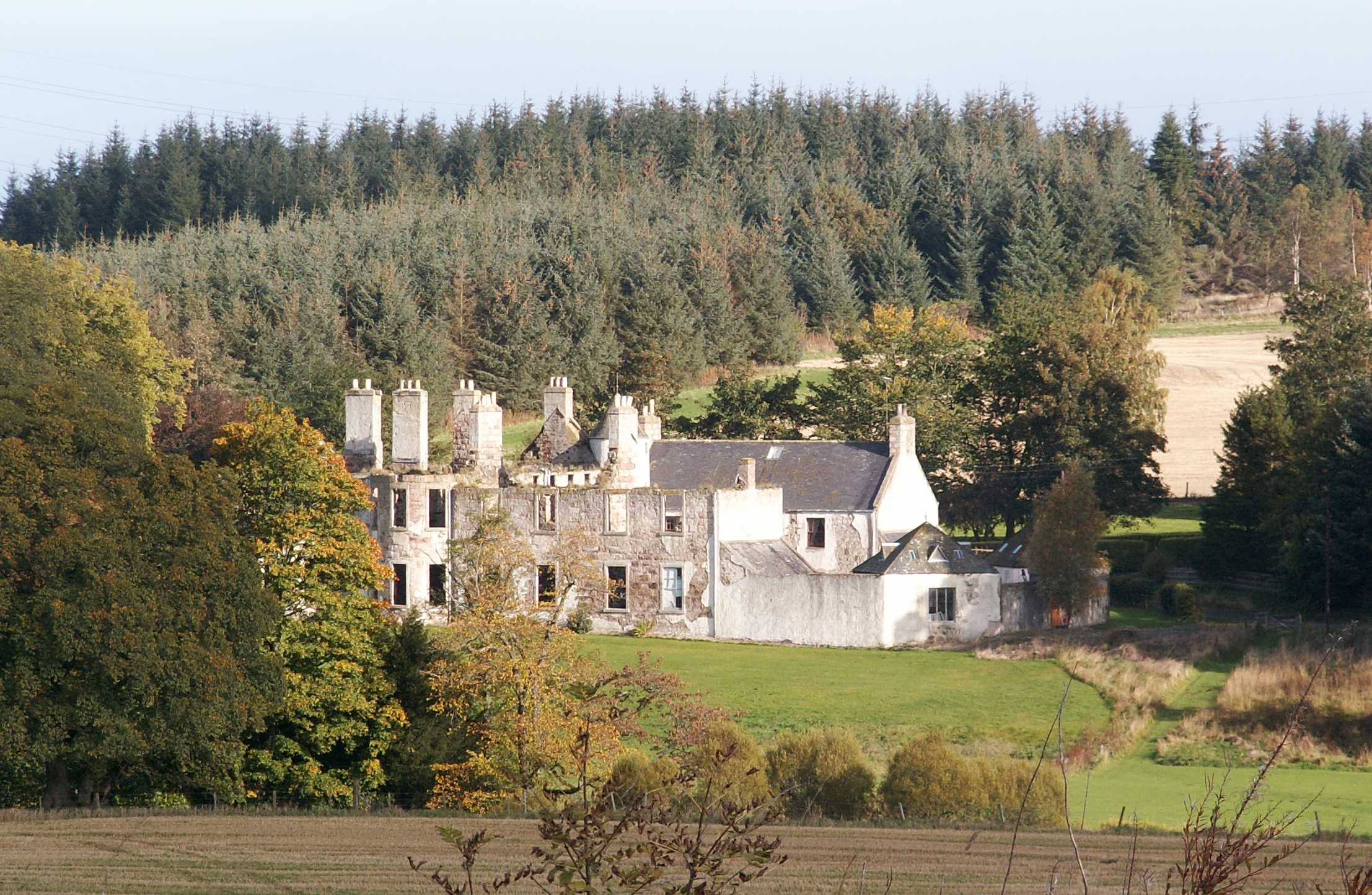
Logie House – now rebuilt – situated 7 miles to the west of Inverurie

On a nearby hillside the Easter Aquhorthies stone circle dates back to the 3rd millennium BC. On the outskirts of the town the Brandsbutt Stone is a class I Pictish symbol stone with an ogham inscription.

The Bass of Inverurie is said to have been founded by David, Earl of Huntingdon, brother of Malcolm IV, in the late 12th century. However the religious foundation pre-dates this by five centuries with the establishment of the Kirk of Inverurie, now known as St Andrew's Parish Church.

The town's earliest known charter dates from 1558, and its modern development started after the building of the Aberdeenshire Canal linking Port Elphinstone with Aberdeen Harbour in 1806.

Battles

There have been three well-known battles in the town:

- The Battle of Inverurie (1308),
- the Battle of Harlaw (1411) between Donald of Islay, Lord of the Isles (MacDonald) and an army commanded by Alexander Stewart, Earl of Mar; and
- the Battle of Inverurie (1745) during the Jacobite rising of 1745.

The House of Aquahorthies is at Burnhervie on the edge of Inverurie, built around 1797. The house served as a clandestine major seminary until after Catholic Emancipation in 1829, and since then it has been a private family home.

During the Second World War, Luftwaffe planes would have been seen several times, during the Blitz against the nearby city of Aberdeen, but Inverurie itself was not bombed.

The Inverurie Locomotive Works, which closed in 1969, led to a modest increase in size and prosperity, but much of the growth came from the "Oil boom" in 1970s.

International Paper had a paper mill at Thainstone, which closed in March 2009.

== Twinning ==
The town was officially twinned with the French town Bagnères-de-Bigorre on 15 October 2016. This partnership fosters cultural exchanges, particularly through educational initiatives like those involving Inverurie Academy. The connection has seen visits from French students, including a notable visit in 2017, when students engaged in various cultural activities, culminating in a ceilidh that celebrated Scottish and French traditions. These exchanges encourage language learning and community bonding between the two towns.

Fiona Peebles was a key figure in this twinning relationship. She was instrumental in fostering cultural exchanges, and was involved in initiatives such as student exchanges and community events. Both towns mourned her death in 2023, as she had had a lasting impact on their twinning partnership.

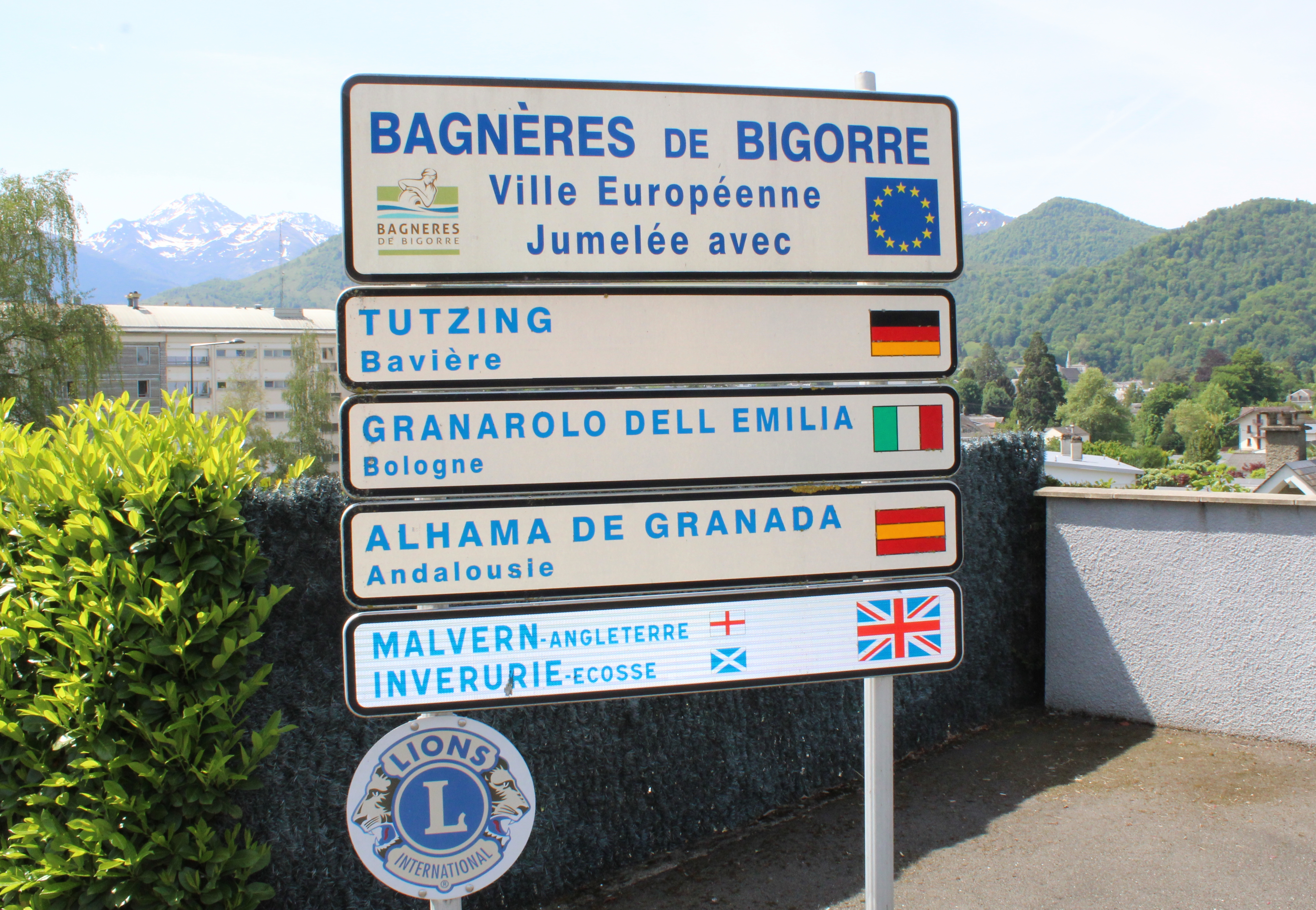
Sign for twinned towns of Bagneres-de-Bigorre

== Industry ==
Inverurie is a market town, now with a monthly farmers' market, with many small shops, businesses and services. Its main industries other than service and commerce are agriculture and oil. The Great North of Scotland Railway constructed its locomotive construction and repair works on a 15-acre (61,000 m^{2}) site at Inverurie. Coombes, a small sweet shop, was famed as being the oldest family-owned business in Scotland until the death of Colin Coombes in 1957 whereupon the business closed. The bakery chain JG Ross is headquartered in the town.

Agriculture continues to be a mainstay of Inverurie's economy, as it has been since the town's inception. The Thainstone Centre, to the south east of the town, is a large livestock market, which rents out commercial units to various agricultural support services, oil industry storage yards and vehicle hire companies.

A 98,000 sq ft (9,100 m^{2}) retail park opened in June 2009.

The town is served by Inverurie Hospital.

== Language ==
Some Inverurie natives speak the Aberdeenshire Doric dialect of Scots, as well as Scottish English. The council's 2016 population survey estimated a population of 13,480 of whom 90.0% spoke primarily English at home, 4.9% Scots and 1.5% Polish. However, 51% of residents reported being proficient in the Scots language.

Historically, Pictish was the ancient language of the area, and it can be found in many place names. It appears to have been a Brythonic language, but its classification remains uncertain. Pictish was eventually replaced by Scottish Gaelic in the area, and evidence of the language is found both in words in the Doric and in place names, such as Inverurie itself. The Book of Deer originates from the village of Old Deer, a few miles to the north east.

== Religion ==
The oldest church in Inverurie is St Andrew's Parish Church, part of The Church of Scotland which was founded as the "Kirk of Rocharl" by the Culdee monks in the 9th century.

== Sports ==
Inverurie Loco Works F.C., who play their matches at Harlaw Park, are the local Highland League football team.

Inverurie Boxing Club, an amateur boxing club located in Kintore. The club was started in 2017 and has since then acquired its own premises and has had multiple Scottish novice and district champions

Colony Park F.C. are the town's juvenile team, founded by Dod Reid MBE in 1978.

Garioch RFC, based at Kellands Park, play Rugby Union.

== Notable residents ==
- William Thom, the weaver poet, worked in Inverurie from 1838 to 1844.
- Hannah Miley, athlete, represented Scotland at the 2010 Commonwealth Games.
- Peter Nicol, former world squash number one, born in Inverurie.
- Barry Robson, Aberdeen former midfielder and manager, born in Inverurie.
- Callum Smith – Double Olympian in cross country skiing, who competed at both the 2014 Winter Olympics and 2018 Winter Olympics attended both Kellands Primary School and Inverurie Academy.

== Transport ==
Inverurie has an hourly internal bus service as well as some out of town services, including to Aberdeen – most (but not all) are provided by Stagecoach Bluebird. The town lies on the A96 road and is served by Inverurie railway station on the Aberdeen to Inverness Line. The nearest airport is Aberdeen Airport at Dyce. Port Elphinstone railway station was a freight depot in Port Elphinstone; it is now disused.

A bypass opened on 7 December 1990 and the A96 was rerouted to use the new road.

== Education ==
Inverurie Academy is the main secondary school in the town.
