= O magnum mysterium (disambiguation) =

O magnum mysterium is a responsorial chant from the Matins of Christmas.

O magnum mysterium may also refer to:

- O magnum mysterium (Lauridsen)
- O magnum mysterium (Palestrina)
