= Z. Randall Stroope =

American composer and conductor (born 1953)

Zane Randall Stroope
- Born: October 25, 1953 (age 72); Albuquerque, New Mexico
- Occupations: Composer, Conductor
- Website: http://www.zrstroope.com

Zane Randall Stroope (born October 25, 1953) is an American composer and conductor. He has published more than 190 works, with: Oxford University Press, Carl Fischer, Alliance Music Publishing, Walton, Colla Voce, and Lorenz.

== Biography ==
Stroope earned a master's degree in voice performance at the University of Colorado (Boulder) and his doctorate in conducting from Arizona State University. In an electronic publication, Stroope states that even though he had dabbled in composition since the age of ten, it was not until he wrote The Cloths of Heaven, and Inscription of Hope, that he began to gain recognition. He states, “I was quite fortunate to have written some works that found great attraction across the country. That sort of catapulted my career compositionally. I was soon being asked to write pieces and conduct those works with the groups that commissioned them. Through conducting, you learn about what works in composition. Both aspects of my career took hold, and I’ve never looked back. I’m busier today than I’ve ever been.”

In addition to composing music and guest conducting, Stroope held Professor of Music positions at Oklahoma State University, Rowan University in Glassboro, New Jersey and at the University of Nebraska at Omaha. As a conductor, he regularly appears nationally and internationally in such venues as: Carnegie Hall, Chicago Orchestra Hall, Sopra Minerva (Rome), and the Kennedy Center.

=== Mentors and contemporaries ===
Cecil Effinger and Normand Lockwood, mentors of Stroope, are well-respected American composers. Effinger's Little Symphony No. 1 and Four Pastorales, arguably his most recognizable pieces, are performed by many ensembles across the U.S. and abroad. Normand Lockwood won the prestigious Prix de Rome, a scholarship given the select students within the arts, which allowed him to study in Rome.

Both Effinger and Lockwood were students of Nadia Boulanger, a student of Gabriel Fauré. Fauré was one of the greatest French composers of the twentieth century. Nadia Boulanger, became one of the most influential music theory teachers of the twentieth century, one of her first pupils being American composer Aaron Copland. Stroope credits Boulanger for his mentors' support of his creativity saying, “Efficiency of writing would be the main thing I took from my studies with Effinger. Boulanger didn’t try to replicate herself through her students; she let them be successful in their own way. As a result, Lockwood and Effinger were very open to different styles of music in my writing. It wasn’t a cookie cutter approach to composition.”

Morten Lauridsen, a colleague and friend of Stroope, is the professor of composition at the University of Southern California Thornton School of Music and has been for more than thirty years. From 1994 to 2001 he held the position the composer-in-residence at the Los Angeles Master Chorale. Lauridsen, composer of works such as O magnum mysterium, Sure on this Shining Night, and Les Chansons des Roses, was named "American Choral Master" by the National Endowment for the Arts. In 2007, President Bush awarded him the National Medal of Arts in a White House ceremony. The National Medal of Arts is the highest award given to artists and arts patrons by the United States government. While Stroope taught at Rowan University in Glassboro, New Jersey, Lauridsen held a residency and The Rowan University Concert Choir performed Lauridsen's works. During the concert, Morten Lauridsen was awarded an Honorary Doctorate from Rowan University. Since then, Stroope and Lauridsen have continued to engage in collaborative projects. In 2010 and 2014, Lauridsen held residencies at Oklahoma State University similar to that at Rowan University.

== Published material ==
=== Compositions (partial list of published works) ===
- Abandon
- All My Heart This Night Rejoices
- All So Still
- American Christmas/American Rhapsody
- Amor de mi alma
- An die Freude
- And Sure Stars Shining... (poem by Sara Teasdale)
- Caritas et amor
- Christi Mutter (No. 2 of Triptych)
- Cloths of Heaven
- Consecrate the Place and Day
- Dance for Love
- Danny Boy
- Danse Macabre
- Dies irae
- Dona nobis pacem
- Echo of Beauty
- Fanfare from Cantus natalis
- Four Sonnets of Garcilaso de la Vega
- Go Lovely Rose
- Homeland
- Hodie! This Day
- How Can I Keep From Singing?
- I carry your heart with me
- Inscription of Hope
- I Am Not Yours
- I Have Loved Hours at Sea
- Image of Beauty
- Invocation
- Judaskuss (The Kiss of Judas) (No. 1 of Triptych)
- Tarantella (Jubilate Agno)
- Kyrie
- Lamentationes Jeremiae Prophetae
- Lux aeterna
- Magnificat
- Michelangelo's Sonnet
- My Flight to Heaven (Charm Me Asleep)
- Northwest Passage: Three Poetic Landscapes
- Odysseus and the Sirens
- Omnia Sol
- Os justi
- Petrus No. 3 of Triptych
- Psalm 23
- Revelation
- Sanctus
- Shall I Compare Thee to a Summer's Day?
- She Walks in Beauty
- Sicut cervus
- Song to the Moon (La Luna)
- Soul Speak
- Sure On This Shining Night
- The Conversion of Saul
- The Pasture
- The Love of Truth
- There is No Rose
- The Road Not Taken
- This Endris Night
- Three Metaphysical Motets
- Vesuvius
- We Beheld Once Again the Stars
- Winter

=== Books ===
Stroope contributed to the book Composers on Composing for Choir along with composers such as René Clausen, Gwyneth Walker, John Rutter and Morten Lauridsen. In this book, Stroope speaks on his experiences with composing, strategies for composing and instructing young composers.

== Awards and honors ==
- 2004 Brock Commission from the American Choral Directors Association.
- Australian-American Fulbright
- Douglas R. McEwen award for National Choral Excellence
- Doug and Nickie Burns Endowed Chair in Choral Music
- Regents Distinguished Research Award
- 2018 Oklahoma State University Eminent Professor Award
- 2020 Honorary member of ANDCI association of Italian choir directors.

== External links (Citations) ==
- Z. Randall Stroope's page at Carl Fischer
- Official website
- Oklahoma State University Department of Music
- An interview with Northwest ACDA Women’s Choir Conductor Z. Randall Stroope
