= Con Anima =

Scottish chamber choir

- Origin: Aberdeen, Scotland
- Genres: Choral
- Occupation: Choir
- Members: Conductor; Paul Mealor
- Website: www.conanima.org.uk

Con Anima is a chamber choir based in Aberdeen, conducted by Professor Paul Mealor.

== History ==
Con Anima was founded in 1995, and between that date and 1999 gave a number of concerts, mostly at St Mary’s Chapel, Blairs, Aberdeen.

In late 2001 Con Anima re-formed, and met informally for several months, before asking local pianist Robert Howie to direct them in a public concert. They have performed several times a year ever since.

Con Anima regularly perform concerts in St Andrew's Cathedral, Aberdeen, King's College, Aberdeen and St Machar's Cathedral as well as travelling further afield. Among the high points of their performing history are a concert featuring Lux Aeterna and other works by renowned American composer Morten Lauridsen in the composer's presence as part of the 2007 Sound festival of contemporary music; and a concert of twentieth-century French music with the distinguished French organist Sophie-Véronique Cauchefer-Choplin, also in 2007.

In early 2008 Con Anima appointed professor Paul Mealor, Senior Lecturer in Music and Concerts Coordinator at the University of Aberdeen, as its principal conductor. However, they continue to work also with guest conductors including professor Andrew Morrisson, Organist and Master of Choristers at St Andrew's Cathedral, Aberdeen, and Dr Roger Williams (organist), Master of Chapel & Ceremonial Music and Organist to the University of Aberdeen.

== Repertoire ==
Con Anima's repertoire spans sacred and secular music from the 16th to the 21st centuries and performances have included world premieres by Paul Mealor and Kyle McCallum.

== Recordings ==
Con Anima's first CD, Paul Mealor: Stabat Mater, was released in October 2009. It includes several previously un-recorded works by Paul Mealor.

In August 2008 members of the choir took part in Phil Cunningham's Grace Notes - a television programme on Scottish church music, filmed in Monymusk Parish Church, Aberdeenshire and broadcast on BBC Two (Scotland) on 21 February 2009.
