= Marshall Rutter =

American lawyer and choral administrator (1931–2024)

Marshall Anthony Rutter (October 18, 1931 – December 4, 2024) was an American lawyer, arts patron and choral music administrator. He was one of the founders of the Los Angeles Master Chorale in 1964, and also a leader of the advocacy group Chorus America. His daughter is the arts administrator Deborah Rutter.

== Life and career ==
Rutter was born in Pottstown, Pennsylvania. He attended Radley College in the UK for one year (1949-50) on an Exchange Fellowship from the Hill School, then studied arts at Amherst College and law at the University of Pennsylvania. Rutter moved to Los Angeles in 1959 and was called to the bar in 1960. He joined the Los Angeles-based lawyers O'Melveny & Myers and later co-founded the Californian law firm Rutter Hobbs & Davidoff in 1973, specializing in family law. After retirement at the age of 75, he set up his own small practice in Pasadena from 2010 to 2019.

At the urging of founding conductor Roger Wagner, Rutter helped set up the Master Chorale in 1964 as a resident company of the then newly constructed Los Angeles Music Center, and served as its president and later chairman. He was continuously on its board for over six decades and as Director Emeritus from 2007. For Chorus America he served on the board from 1987 to 1996, chairing the board from 1993 to 1995. He received Chorus America’s Michael Korn Founders Award for the Development of the Professional Choral Art in 2001.

Rutter was particularly noted for commissioning new music, including Morten Lauridsen's O Magnum Mysterium, which he commissioned in 1994, in honor of his wife Terry Knowles (they had married two years earlier). It was the composer's first commission and its popularity made him famous.

== Personal life ==
Marshall Rutter married Winifred Hitz in Amhurst on June 6 1953 and there were three children: Deborah (born 1956), Gregory (born 1957) and Theodore (born 1958). Deborah F. Rutter was president of the John F. Kennedy Center for the Performing Arts in Washington, D.C. from 2014 until February 2025. The marriage ended in divorce in 1970, and Rutter married Virginia Ann Hardy in January 1971. They divorced in 1992. In December 1992 he married Terry Knowles, also an executive director of the Los Angeles Master Chorale.

Rutter died at his home in Pasadena on December 4, 2024, at the age of 93, survived by his wife Terry Knowles.
