= Still Life with Lemons, Oranges and a Rose =

1633 painting by Francisco de Zurbarán

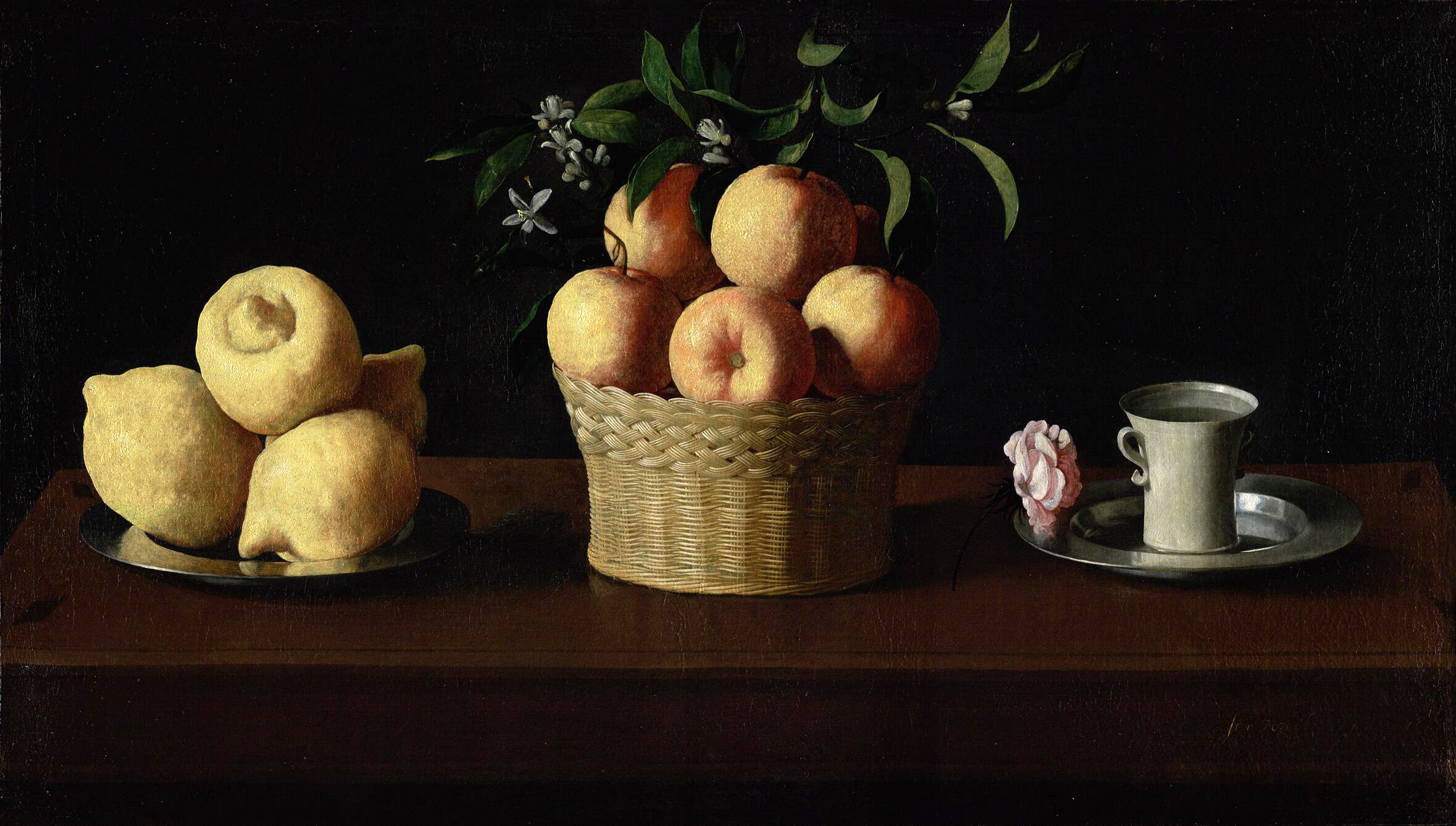
- Artist: Francisco de Zurbarán
- Year: 1633
- Medium: Oil on canvas
- Dimensions: 62.2 cm × 107 cm (23.6 in × 42.1 in)
- Location: Norton Simon Museum, Pasadena

Still Life with Lemons, Oranges and a Rose is an oil-on-canvas painting by Baroque Spanish artist Francisco de Zurbarán completed in 1633. It is currently displayed at the Norton Simon Museum in Pasadena, California as part of its permanent collection. It is the only still life signed and dated by him and is considered a masterwork of the genre.

The painting was featured in the 1980 BBC Two series 100 Great Paintings.

== Composition and analysis ==
The painting shows three groups of objects (a saucer of four citrons, a basket of oranges, and a saucer holding both a cup of water and a rose) resting on a table against a dark background. Each group of objects are placed equidistant from one another and form a spatial and geometrical balance due to their pyramidal organization. As described by Andreas Prater:

Zurbaran isolates the objects from one another – even the composition appears to be a conscious, though not excessively artificial arrangement. Against the dark background, the objects are completely static, and appear to be torn out of the context of everyday life. The human beings to whom they apparently belong have no place here.

Norman Bryson writes:

Lemons, Oranges, Cup and a Rose shows a visual field so purified and so perfectly composed that the familiar objects seem on the brink of transfiguration or (the inevitable word) transubstantiation. Standing at some imminent intersection with the divine, and with eternity, they exactly break with the normally human.

Many of Zurbarán's works contained Christian themes, and the objects in the painting are often interpreted as having symbolic meaning as alluding to the Holy Trinity or as an homage to the Virgin Mary.

Morten Lauridsen wrote in the Wall Street Journal:

...the objects in this work are symbolic offerings to the Virgin Mary. Her love, purity and chastity are signified by the rose and the cup of water. The lemons are an Easter fruit that, along with the oranges with blossoms, indicate renewed life. The table is a symbolic altar.

Lauridsen has cited the painting as a major inspiration for his 1994 choral setting of O magnum mysterium.
