= The Zurich Chamber Singers =

Vocal ensemble

The Zurich Chamber Singers are a professional vocal ensemble from Zurich, Switzerland.

The ensemble was founded in 2015 by the pianist and conductor Christian Erny and consists of around 30 singers, most of whom from Switzerland. The size of the choir is flexible and varies depending on the project and repertoire, from an octet to a full concert choir.

== Work ==
The Zurich Chamber Singers first performed in public in 2015 with ten singers, but have since mostly performed as a chamber choir of 16 to 24 singers. They have performed at concerts in Switzerland, Germany and Austria, at venues such as Tonhalle Zurich, the Elbphilharmonie Hamburg, the Stiftskirche Stuttgart and the Brucknerhaus Linz.

The ensemble performs a wide range of musical repertoires from Renaissance polyphony to twentieth-century symphonic works. In 2020, the choir appeared in its largest formation to date for performances of Honegger's oratorio King David. Since their foundation, the Zurich Chamber Singers have been dedicated to working with contemporary composers, including several early-career composers. The ensemble has collaborated closely with the US-American composer Caroline Shaw and the British composer Paul Mealor, and has commissioned works by Paul Mealor as well as Patrick Brennan (UK), Kevin Hartnett (USA), Burkhard Kinzler (D) and Rhiannon Randle (UK). In their concert programmes, these contemporary works were often combined with works from the Renaissance, Baroque and Romanticism. In 2025 the Zurich Chamber Singers performed in the first performance of the opera "Walpurgisnacht" by Swiss composer Alfred Felder by the Orchester Musikkollegium Winterthur.

The Zurich Chamber Singers regularly collaborate with Swiss orchestras; they frequently perform with the Orchester Musikkollegium Winterthur. Further collaborative projects have taken place with the Zurich Chamber Orchestra, the Orchestra of Europe, the Morphing Chamber Orchestra and the CHAARTS Chamber Artists.

The ensemble has published several CD albums. It has had a recording contract with the label Berlin Classics since 2020.

== Recordings ==
- 2018: Passio (ARS Produktion); works by Thomas Tallis, Henry Purcell, Johann Sebastian Bach and Kevin Hartnett.
- 2020: O Nata Lux (Berlin Classics); music for Advent and Christmas
- 2021: Scarlatti: Stabat Mater (Berlin Classics)
- 2022: Bruckner Spektrum (Berlin Classics); works by Anton Bruckner, Burkhard Kinzler und Giovanni Pierluigi da Palestrina
- 2024: The Light of Paradise (Berlin Classics); a choral opera by Paul Mealor on texts by Margery Kempe
