= David Wightman =

David Wightman may refer to:

- David Wightman (painter) (born 1980), English painter
- David Wightman (priest) (born 1939), Anglican priest
- Ross Wightman (David Ross Wightman, 1929–2012), New Zealand rugby union player
- David Wightman, see Scottish Broadcasting Commission

== See also ==
- David Whiteman (disambiguation)
