= Arthur Hodgkinson =

Arthur Hodgkinson may refer to:

- Arthur Hodgkinson (priest) (1913–1995), English priest of the Anglican church
- Arthur Hodgkinson (RAF officer) (1916–1943), British flying ace
