= David Whiteman =

David Whiteman may refer to:

- David Andrew Patrick Whiteman, Canadian musician and songwriter
- David Bruce Whiteman (born 1952), Canadian American poet, translator, and essayist

== See also ==
- David Wightman (disambiguation)
