= Andrew Morrisson =

British musician

Andrew Morrisson is a British classical organist and Master of the Choristers at St Andrew's Cathedral, Aberdeen, and Associate Head of the School of Pharmacy & Life Sciences at the Robert Gordon University.

== Biography ==
Morrisson was educated at Brentwood School (England) in Essex, where he studied organ with Edgar Brice from the Royal Academy of Music, and at Imperial College London, where he studied chemistry. Following a move to Aberdeen to study for a PhD at the Macaulay Institute, he was appointed Assistant Organist at St Andrew's Cathedral, Aberdeen, and then Organist and Master of the Choristers in 1983, succeeding Geoffrey Pearce.

Morrisson has conducted the St Andrew's Cathedral Choir in radio and television broadcasts and has made a number of recordings, including a solo CD to mark 21 years tenure at the Cathedral. He has conducted the Cathedral Choir in over 20 of the major churches in the United Kingdom, most recently in St Paul's Cathedral, London. In October 2005 he led the Cathedral Choir, including the newly formed Cathedral Girls' Choir, on a tour of New York, Boston and Hartford, Connecticut. 2008 marked the 25th anniversary of Morrisson's appointment as Organist and Master of Choristers at St Andrew's Cathedral. Morrisson has also conducted several Aberdeen choirs, most notably Con Anima, and has been involved with co-operation between cathedral music departments across Scotland for many years.

Morrisson is the Associate Head of the School of Pharmacy & Life Sciences at the Robert Gordon University Aberdeen. Since 2001 he has been the Subject Leader in Forensic Science at RGU with responsibility for implementing undergraduate and postgraduate teaching programmes and coordinating research and consultancy in forensic science. His own research interest focuses on the application of analytical chemistry and chemometric techniques to forensic science and on the use of soil as forensic evidence. He is currently a member of the Board of the Forensic Institute Research Network and in 2008 was made an honorary professor at the Bonn-Rhein-Sieg university of Applied Sciences, Bonn, Germany.
