= Pete Stollery =

British composer

- Born: 24 July 1960 (age 66); Halifax, West Yorkshire
- Education: University of Birmingham
- Occupations: Composer and academic
- Website: petestollery.com

Pete Stollery (born 24 July 1960 in Halifax, UK) is a British composer, specialising in electroacoustic music.

Stollery studied with Jonty Harrison at the University of Birmingham from 1979 to 1996, and is currently Professor in Composition and Electroacoustic Music at the University of Aberdeen.

His work Shortstuff was awarded a Special Prize at the Musica Nova competition in Prague in 1994. Onset/Offset has received honorable mentions at the 1996 Stockholm Electronic Arts Award and the 1998 Pierre Schaeffer competition. Altered Images received Second Prize in the São Paulo competition in 1997. His music was featured at the ISCM World Music Days in Germany in 1995.

In 2008, Stollery's scènes, rendez-vous was featured at the Signal & Noise festival in Vancouver and at the sound festival in Aberdeenshire.

== Activities ==
He chaired the Sonic Arts Network from 1985 to 2003 and edits its annual Journal of Electroacoustic Music. He is a founder member of invisiblEARts, a group of sound artists based in Scotland, also including Simon Atkinson, Robert Dow, Alistair MacDonald, Pippa Murphy, Nick Virgo and Pete Dowling.

Stollery is one of the founders of the Sound Festival in the north-east of Scotland, a month-long festival of new music.

== Recordings ==
Solo Recordings

- Un son peut en cacher un autre (empreintes DIGITALes, IMED 0678, 2006)

Compilation Recordings

- Une Production Acousmatica (Acousmatica, CD1296, 1996) – Shioum
- Maximal Music 4 (PanAroma, CD199.003.658, 1998) – Altered Images
- 50 ans de Musique Concrète (Acousmatica, CD1298, 1998) – Onset/Offset
- Electroacoustic Music 3 (Electroshock, ELCD010, 1999) – Onset/Offset
- Electroacoustic Music 6 (Electroshock, ELCD020, 2000) – Peel
- Sonic Art from... (MPS, MPSCD013, 1999) – ABZ/A, Shortstuff
- Legacies (Sargasso, SCD28046, 2003) – Onset/Offset, Altered Images
- Florida Electroacoustic Music Festival, Vol 1 (EMF, EMF131, 2003) – Squirt (Griffin Campbell, alto saxophone)
- You Are Here (Accidental Records, ac07 cd, 2003) – Onset/Offset
- Vibro 3 – The Citizen Band Issue (Avence Double Entendre, 2005) – Serendipities an Synchronicities
- Drift: Resonant Cities (New Media Scotland, 2007) – ABZ/A
- Deep Wireless 6 (New Adventures in Sound Art, 2009) – Still Voices

Internet

- Far Afield; A Webbed Hand Compilation (Webbed Hand Records, Webbed Hand 055, 2005) – Banchory Ears
- Football Sound Narratives (Binauralmedia.org, Nodar 001, 2010) – Back to Square One

== List of works ==
Acousmatic/Soundscape

- Cloches (1987)
- Shortstuff (1993)
- Shioum (1994)
- Altered Images (1995)
- Onset/Offset (1996)
- Peel (1997)
- ABZ/A (1998)
- Vox Magna (2003)
- Banchory Ears (2004)
- Serendipities and Synchronicities (2004)
- Fields of Silence (2005)
- Still Voices (2005)
- Scènes, rendez-vous (2006)
- Back to Square One (2007)

Electroacoustic with instruments/voices

- Myth (1986), for four amplified voices (SATB) and live electronics
- Faible (1987), for electric harp and live electronics
- Squirt (1994), for alto saxophone and digital music
- Thickness (2000), for flute, viola and digital music
- Planar (2006), for trumpet and digital music
- bɜ:dz (2008), for organ and digital music
- 74 Degrees North (2010), electroacoustic score for opera with Paul Mealor

Multimedia Music and Sound Design

- Archaeolink (1997)
- Our Dynamic Earth (1999)
- Magna Science Adventure Centre (2000)
- Saint Patrick Centre (2000)
- Norwich Millenium Library (2001)
- Benjamin Franklin House (2006)
