= Arthur Hodgkinson (priest) =

Arthur Edward Hodgkinson (29 October 1913 – 19 April 1995) was an Anglican priest, most notably Provost of St Andrew's Cathedral, Aberdeen from 1965 until 1978.

Hodgkinson was born on 29 October 1913 and educated at Edinburgh Theological College. He was ordained in 1940. After curacies in Glasgow and Perth, he was Priest in charge of Lochgelly from 1947 to 1954. He was then Rector of Motherwell from 1954 until his appointment as Provost.

He died on 19 April 1995.

Religious titles
Preceded by William Patrick Shannon	Provost of St Andrew's Cathedral, Aberdeen; 1965–1978	Succeeded by Donald Howard
