= Michael Kaiser =

American arts administrator (born 1953)

Michael Angeles Kaiser
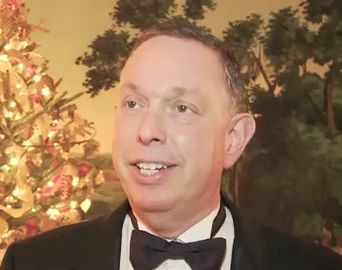
- Kaiser at the White House for the 2009 Kennedy Center Honors

President of the John F. Kennedy Center for the Performing Arts
- In office 2001–2014
- Preceded by: Lawrence Wilker
- Succeeded by: Deborah Rutter

Personal details
- Born: October 27, 1953 (age 73) New York City, New York, U.S.
- Citizenship: American
- Spouse: John Roberts (m. 2013)
- Education: Brandeis University (BA); Massachusetts Institute of Technology (MBA)
- Occupation: arts executive

Michael M. Kaiser (born October 27, 1953) is an American arts administrator who served as president of the John F. Kennedy Center for the Performing Arts (2001–2014) in Washington, D.C. Kaiser currently lives in Great Falls, Virginia.

Dubbed "the turnaround king" for his work at such arts institutions as the Kansas City Ballet, Alvin Ailey American Dance Theater, American Ballet Theatre, and the Royal Opera House, Kaiser has earned international renown for his expertise in arts management.

== Early life ==
Born October 27, 1953, in New York City, Kaiser grew down in New Rochelle, New York, earning an undergraduate degree in economics and minor in music from Brandeis University, magna cum laude, and a master's degree in management from the MIT Sloan School of Management. His study of vocal music reflected an early passion for the arts, and while he hoped for a career as an opera singer he was, as he put it, "just dreadful".

== Career ==
Kaiser's early career focused on strategic planning and management consulting. In 1981, he founded Kaiser Associates, a consulting firm whose clients included General Motors and IBM. But in 1985, spurred by his lifelong love of the arts, he sold his consulting firm to enter the world of arts management.

=== Transition to arts management ===
When he joined the Kansas City Ballet as general manager in 1985, the company was on the brink of bankruptcy. Within two years, Kaiser had revamped and energized the troupe's fundraising, and attracted critical attention and acclaim through ambitious programming initiatives. His leadership enabled the company to pay off the accumulated deficit, which had nearly led to its closure.

Kaiser joined the Alvin Ailey American Dance Theater as executive director in 1991. The company faced extreme challenges, stemming from a $1.5 million accumulated deficit. Kaiser developed a strategic plan with the company's board and staff, targeting fundraising and marketing as key areas for overhaul. Recognizing the company's broad, international appeal, Kaiser set about putting the dancers before a much larger audience. In December 1992, the company was featured on The Donahue Show, then the premiere daytime television program. In an unprecedented move, the full one-hour program was devoted to the Alvin Ailey American Dance Theater, an event viewed by 18 million Americans. In 1993, the company performed at President Bill Clinton's inaugural gala, which was broadcast to an audience of 88 million. During Kaiser's tenure as executive director, the Alvin Ailey American Dance Theater eliminated its deficit, increased the efficiency of its touring programs, and enhanced its national and international image.

In 1995, Kaiser became executive director of American Ballet Theatre. With an accumulated deficit of $5.5 million, the company was struggling on the brink of closure. Ticket revenues were insufficient to meet the company's needs and the towering debt had reduced the board, management, and staff to a daily struggle to keep afloat, forestalling any strategic or long-range planning.

Kaiser set about finding the large donations needed to reduce the $5.5 million deficit. He revamped the touring program, reaching out to cities across the United States as well as in Asia and Europe. He created new education programs to nurture both new dancers and new audiences. And he fueled aggressive new marketing programs, burnishing American Ballet Theatre's long-held reputation as a "company of stars." Within three years, the company had eliminated the entire accumulated deficit and established a surplus. After his success at American Ballet Theatre, the Chicago Tribune coined the sobriquet "The Turnaround King" for Kaiser.

In 1998, Kaiser assumed leadership of the Royal Opera House in London, home of the Royal Opera, London and the Royal Ballet. In the midst of a major renovation, faced with a projected $30 million deficit, and flailing in a firestorm of criticism from the public, its board, and its patrons, the Royal Opera House was facing the most severe crisis of its history. Despite press reports predicting, even welcoming, the demise of the organization, and vitriol from patrons, Kaiser set to work, negotiating with the unions, placating the creative staff of the two resident companies, guiding the new facility through its final construction and problematic technical and stagecraft operations, and beginning the delicate work of repairing the institution's reputation as he worked to erase its debt. Within two years, the deficit was paid off, the new building paid for and opened, and an endowment fund established to protect the security of the Royal Opera House's future.

=== Kennedy Center ===
In 2001, Kaiser joined the Kennedy Center as president. Unlike the organizations which had established his reputation as a savior of companies on the brink of disaster, the Kennedy Center was financially stable and not in need of a turnaround. But Kaiser set the goal of enhancing the Center's status as the nation's center for the performing arts, a destination for both American and international arts lovers.

His first undertaking was the "Sondheim Celebration", an unprecedented staging of six musicals by Stephen Sondheim, within one season, under one roof: Sweeney Todd: The Demon Barber of Fleet Street, Company, A Little Night Music, Sunday in the Park with George, Merrily We Roll Along, and Passion. Critical response to the Sondheim Celebration was extraordinary, and the box office opened to record-breaking sales.

Two other theatrical achievements were a retrospective of Tennessee Williams' work and a highly acclaimed celebration of the ten plays of August Wilson presented in sequential order.

Having set the bar high, Kaiser continued to upgrade the Kennedy Center's artistic profile, negotiating long-term agreements with the Mariinsky Opera and the Mariinsky Ballet, the Royal Shakespeare Company, New York City Ballet, and the Bolshoi Ballet that ensured their regular appearance at the Kennedy Center; producing major festivals of the arts including "The Festival of China", "JAPAN: culture+hyperculture," and "Arabesque: Arts of the Arab World;" each bringing hundreds of international performers and artists to American audiences for the first time; and expanding the Kennedy Center's jazz and family programming. He has expanded educational programming, increasing the annual education budget to $25 million for programs reaching young people and adults—more than any other arts institution.

Long committed to teaching and education, Kaiser has made the Kennedy Center a university of sorts for arts organizations and arts managers by founding, in 2010, the Kennedy Center Arts Management Institute to provide advanced training for young arts administrators and developing a series of programs to help train others in the field. The Institute transitioned to the University of Maryland in September 2014, as the DeVos Institute of Arts Management, based on a $22.5 million endowment from Dick and Betsy DeVos, with Kaiser as Chairman.

He has created a "capacity-building" program, that offers mentoring services to the leaders of 33 African American, Latino, Asian American and Native American arts groups from across the United States, and has instituted similar programs for over 250 arts organizations in New York City and 74 in the Washington, D.C. metro area. He has established a fellows program for arts managers, enabling students and practicing arts managers to study at the Kennedy Center in a practicum that exposes them to the day-to-day work of the center's departments, from marketing and fundraising to programming and operations.

=== Arts in Crisis ===
Kaiser launched Arts In Crisis: A Kennedy Center Initiative in early February 2009, which provides free arts management consultation to arts organizations across the United States. Within 24 hours of unveiling the site, the program received 110 emails from 31 states. "[The initiative] is a high-tech support service through which arts administrators can talk to the Center's personnel about the challenges of shrinking income, budget-conscious audiences and other difficulties in keeping the doors open." Arts in Crisis: A Kennedy Center Initiative is a response to the emergency facing arts organizations throughout the United States. The program, open to non-profit 501(c)(3) performing arts organizations, provides free and confidential planning assistance in areas pertinent to maintaining a vital performing arts organization during a troubled economy. Over 100 experienced arts leaders from across the country are volunteering their time to serve as mentors to organizations in need. Since the initiative's launch in February 2009, the Kennedy Center has hosted symposia and arts community conversations in major cities across the country.

=== Arts in Crisis: 50 State Tour ===
In June, 2009, the Kennedy Center launched a 50 state tour supporting the Arts in Crisis initiative. Michael Kaiser travels to cities in all 50 states, Puerto Rico, and the District of Columbia to lead arts management symposia. At each event, hosted by a local arts organization, Kaiser addresses the challenges facing non-profit performing arts organizations in each city through such areas as fundraising, building more effective Boards of Trustees, budgeting, and marketing.

== Other activities ==
Kaiser is also a cultural ambassador for the U.S. State Department, advising performing arts organizations around the world on building institutional strength through marketing, strategic planning, and fundraising. He has created an online educational forum for arts administrators, where professionals and students in the field can share experience, ask and answer questions, and seek employment and board opportunities.

In June 2009, Kaiser became a weekly blogger for The Huffington Post.

In April 2024, he purchased a home in Great Falls, Virginia, for $7.2 million, making it one of the priciest home sales in the region in that month. In October 2024, he listed the house for $7.195 million and it sold for $7.1 million in November 2024.

== Awards ==
- Dance Magazine Award. 2001
- Capezio Award, 2002
- Helen Hayes Washington Post Award for Innovative Leadership in the Theater Community, 2003
- St. Petersburg 300 Medal, 2004
- Washingtonian of the Year, 2004
- US Department of State Citation, 2005
- Blacks in Dance Award, 2005
- First American to receive China's "Award for Cultural Exchange", 2005
- Musical America's 2006 Impresario of the Year
- Kahlil Gibran "Spirit of Humanity" Award from Arab American Institute Foundation, 2009
- George Peabody Medal for Outstanding Contributions to Music in America, 2009
- Doctor of Humane Letters, honoris causa, Georgetown University, 2011

== Decorations ==
- Order of the Aztec Eagle, 2006
- Commander of the Royal Order of the Polar Star - 26 September 2013

== Bibliography ==
Kaiser has served as a research economist for Nobel prize-winning economist, Wassily Leontief, and is the author of seven books:

- Curtains? The Future of the Arts in America (Brandeis University Press, 2015)
- The Cycle: A Practical Approach to Managing Arts Organizations with Brett E. Egan (Brandeis University Press, 2013)
- Leading Roles: 50 Questions Every Arts Board Should Ask (Brandeis University Press, 2010)
- The Art of the Turnaround: Creating and Maintaining Healthy Arts Organizations (Brandeis University Press, 2008) ISBN 978-1-58465-735-4
- Strategic Planning in the Arts: A Practical Guide (Brandeis University Press, 1995)
- Developing Industry Strategies: A Practical Guide of Industry Analysis (Kaiser Associates, 1983)
- Understanding the Competition: A Practical Guide of Competitive Analysis (Kaiser Associates, 1981)

== Personal life ==
Kaiser is married to John Roberts, an economist with the Commodity Futures Trading Commission. Their August 31, 2013 wedding was officiated by Kaiser's close friend Associate Justice Ruth Bader Ginsburg, the first-ever instance of a US Supreme Court justice performing a same-sex marriage. The wedding took place two months after Ginsburg joined a majority in overturning Section 3 of the Defense of Marriage Act and requiring the federal government to recognize such marriage though they had been legal within the District of Columbia, where the marriage was performed since 2010. (Roberts is not related to US Chief Justice John G. Roberts.)

He has two siblings: Thomas Kaiser is a history professor at the University of Arkansas, Little Rock, and Susan Kaiser founded a non-profit pre-school, "Bread and Roses." Kaiser donated a kidney to his sister, Susan, in 1988.
