= Peter Ellefson =

American musician and educator

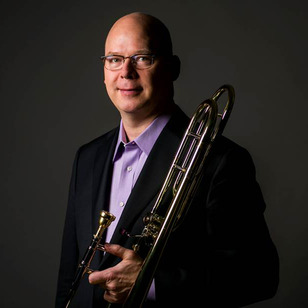
- Education: Linfield College; Northwestern University
- Occupation: Professor
- Employer: Indiana University
- Spouse: Deborah Rutter
- Website: https://www.peterellefson.com/

Peter Ellefson is a trombonist and professor of music at Indiana University Bloomington's Jacobs School of Music, having been a faculty member since 2002 and Chair of the Brass Department from 2014–2021.

== Education ==
Ellefson is from Myrtle Creek, Oregon and is the youngest son of music educator, Wendell Ellefson (deceased 1994). A 1980 graduate of South Umpqua High School, Ellefson attended and graduated with honors in 1984, from Linfield College in McMinnville, Oregon, where he was honored as the Most Outstanding Alumnus in 2012. He received his master's degree in 1985 from Northwestern University. His primary teachers have been Warren Baker, Mark Lawrence, Frank Crisafulli, M. Dee Stewart and Joseph Alessi. He also considers his time in the 1980s, driving the motorhome for the Empire Brass and hearing them perform nearly every day to be pivotal in his musical development.

== Career ==
Ellefson has been a frequent guest musician with the Chicago Symphony and the New York Philharmonic and has also performed with the Boston Symphony, The Cleveland Orchestra, and the St. Louis Symphony. In 1991, he was an assistant professor at Eastern Washington University and was a member of the Spokane Symphony. From 1992-2002 he was a member of the Seattle Symphony, where he participated in dozens of recordings, performing on trombone, euphonium and bass trumpet. He was the principal trombone for many of Seattle Opera's productions of Richard Wagner's Der Ring Des Nibelungen. While in Seattle he also participated in hundreds of recording sessions for film, television and video game soundtracks. Peter Ellefson has released three solo recordings. In 2010, he released his first solo recording titled Pura Vida on the Summit Records label. In 2017, he released À la Manière de Defaye and in 2019, his most recent, “3.” He is currently recording his fourth solo recording.

== Contributions ==
Ellefson has authored articles on Wagner, Bruckner, and orchestral freelancing in the Journal of the International Trombone Association and in the Brass Player's Cookbook.

== Personal ==
Ellefson is married to Deborah Rutter, former president of the John F. Kennedy Center for the Performing Arts in Washington, D.C., and who has recently been appointed Vice-Provost for the Arts at Duke University.
