= Henry Erskine Hill =

Scottish priest and author (1864–1939)

Henry Erskine Hill (10 March 1864 – 22 April 1939) was an Anglican priest and author.

Erskine was born on 10 March 1864, educated at the University of Edinburgh; and ordained in 1888. After curacies in Edinburgh and Glasgow he was Rector of St George, Glasgow from 1895 to 1912. He became Rector of St Andrew's Cathedral, Aberdeen in 1912; and Provost in 1914. In 1932 he became vicar of Monkhopton; and in 1934 a prebendary of Hereford Cathedral.

He died on 22 April 1939.

Religious titles
Preceded by William Perry	Provost of St Andrew's Cathedral, Aberdeen; 1914 –1932	Succeeded by Gordon Kinnell
