= Isaac Poobalan =

Provost of St Andrew's, Aberdeen; Scottish Episcopal priest

Isaac Munuswamy Poobalan is an Anglican priest. He has been Provost of St Andrew's Cathedral, Aberdeen since 2015.

== Biography ==
Poobalan was born in 1962. He studied at University of Edinburgh.

Pooblan was ordained in 1995. He served his curacy at St Peter's, Lutton Place, Edinburgh. He was then Priest in charge at St Clement, Aberdeen. He was Rector of St John's, Aberdeen from 2001 until his appointment as Provost. He is also Chaplain of Robert Gordon University.

Anglican Communion titles
Preceded by Richard Eifl Kilgour	Provost of St Andrew's Cathedral, Aberdeen; 2015 to present	Incumbent
