= Gordon Kinnell =

English Anglican priest

Gordon Jack Kinnell AKC (2 May 1892 – 18 November 1971) was an Anglican priest, most notably Provost of St Andrew's Cathedral, Aberdeen from 1932 until 1955.

Kinnell was born in Ipswich, Suffolk. He was educated at King's College London; and ordained in 1916. After curacies in Battersea and Clapton he was Rector of Bearsden. He was the incumbent at Cupar before his appointment as Provost; and at Buntingford afterwards.

He died in Danbury, Essex, aged 80.

Religious titles
Preceded by Henry Erskine Hill	Provost of St Andrew's Cathedral, Aberdeen; 1932–1955	Succeeded by Paddy Shannon
