= Richard Kilgour =

Richard Eifl Kilgour is an Anglican priest: he was Provost of St Andrew's Cathedral, Aberdeen from 2003 until 2015.

== Biography ==
Kilgour was born in 1957, educated at the University of Edinburgh and Edinburgh Theological College; and ordained in 1986. After a curacy at St Giles, Wrexham he was Vicar at St Mary & St Beuno, Whitford from 1988 to 1997. He was Rector of Llanllwchaiarn with Aberhafesp before his time as Provost; and general secretary of the International Christian Maritime Association afterwards.

Religious titles
Preceded by William David Wightman	Provost of St Andrew's Cathedral, Aberdeen; 2015 –2015	Succeeded by Isaac Munuswamy Poobalan
