= William Smith (Provost of St Andrew's Cathedral, Aberdeen) =

Scottish priest

William Smith was Provost of Aberdeen in the middle of the 18th century.

== Notes ==
Anglican Communion titles
| Preceded by | Provost of St Andrew's Cathedral, Aberdeen; 1735– 1774 | Succeeded by John Skinner |
