= Paddy Shannon =

Anglican priest (1909–1995)

William Patrick Shannon (9 December 1909 – 1995) was an Anglican priest, most notably Provost of St Andrew's Cathedral, Aberdeen from 1955 until 1965.

Shannon was born in Glasgow in 1909, educated at the University of Glasgow and Edinburgh Theological College, and ordained in 1934. After curacies in Edinburgh he was Rector of Haddington from 1939 until 1946 and then of Elgin until his appointment as Provost.

He died in 1995.

Religious titles
Preceded by Gordon Kinnell	Provost of St Andrew's Cathedral, Aberdeen; 1955–1965	Succeeded by Arthur Hodgkinson
