= O magnum mysterium (Lauridsen) =

Motet for choir by Morten Lauridsen

- Motet by Morten Lauridsen
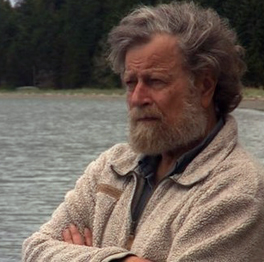
- Morten Lauridsen in 2012
- Occasion: Christmas
- Text: O magnum mysterium
- Language: Latin
- Composed: 1994
- Dedication: Los Angeles Master Chorale
- Performed: 18 December 1994: Los Angeles
- Published: 1995
- Scoring: SATB div.

O magnum mysterium (O great mystery) is a motet for choir a cappella by Morten Lauridsen. He set the text of "O magnum mysterium", a Gregorian chant for Christmas, in 1994. The composition, performed and recorded often, made Lauridsen famous. It was described as expressive ethereal sounds in imperturbable calmness.

== History ==
The American composer Morten Lauridsen was professor of composition at the USC Thornton School of Music for fifty-two years until his retirement in 2019. He wrote his setting of "O magnum mysterium" in 1994, on a commission from Marshall Rutter of the Los Angeles Master Chorale, for his wife Terry Knowles.

The composition was first performed at the Dorothy Chandler Pavilion in Los Angeles on 18 December 1994 by the Los Angeles Master Chorale, conducted by Paul Salamunovich. It was published in 1995 by Southern Music Publishing. The popular setting was often performed and recorded and became one of Lauridsen's signature pieces. Sandra Dackow wrote an arrangement for strings.

== Text and music ==
The Latin text "O magnum mysterium" is a Gregorian chant from the fifth responsory of nine for Vigil on Christmas Day. It reflects first oxen and donkey next to the manger as first mentioned in Isaiah 1:3. and traditionally related to the nativity of Jesus as a symbol for the mystery of the self-abasement of God in his Incarnation. In a second theme, the text is based on the greeting of Elizabeth welcoming Mary when she visits.

Latin text

O magnum mysterium,
et admirabile sacramentum,
ut animalia viderent Dominum natum,
iacentem in praesepio!
Beata Virgo, cujus viscera
meruerunt portare
Dominum Iesum Christum.
Alleluia!

English translation

O great mystery,
and wonderful sacrament,
that animals should see the newborn Lord,
lying in a manger!
Blessed is the virgin whose womb
was worthy to bear
the Lord, Jesus Christ.
Alleluia!

The text was set to music by composers over the centuries, including Palestrina, Tomás Luis de Victoria, Francis Poulenc, and Jennifer Higdon. Lauridsen set the text as a motet for SATB choir.

== Composition ==
=== Inspiration ===
The composer said that he was inspired by a 1633 painting from the Norton Simon Museum, Zurbarán's Still Life with Lemons, Oranges and a Rose (1633), which has been interpreted as symbolism for the Virgin Mary.

Morten Lauridsen wrote in the Wall Street Journal:

...the objects in this work are symbolic offerings to the Virgin Mary. Her love, purity and chastity are signified by the rose and the cup of water. The lemons are an Easter fruit that, along with the oranges with blossoms, indicate renewed life. The table is a symbolic altar.

Lauridsen remembered that he worked on the composition for six months.

=== Intentions ===
He described his intentions: "I wanted this piece to resonate immediately and deeply into the core of the listener, to illumine through sound." He said that the work is meant as "a quiet song of profound inner joy", with music expressing both the mystery of the Incarnation and Mary's tenderness for her child.

Lauridsen remembered that he put considerable thinking into a dissonant chord to comment on Mary's sorrow about her son to be killed.

== Recordings ==
The first performers recorded the work on a 2002 CD with other choral compositions by Lauridsen, entitled after one of them Lux aeterna. A reviewer noted the freshness of the around 90 singers who appear regularly with the Los Angeles Philharmonic Orchestra. He described the tonal music as influenced by Arvo Pärt and John Rutter. Lauridsen founded a choir of 22 international singers to perform his music, the Nordic Chamber Choir, in 1997. He worked with them on a recording of four pieces, including the title piece "O magnum mysterium", conducted with Nicol Matt. A reviewer noted the "higher simplicity" (höhere Einfachheit) achieved by simple melodies, expressive ethereal sounds, and imperturbable calmness.
