= Locus iste (Mealor) =

2009 motet composed by Paul Mealor

- Motet by Paul Mealor
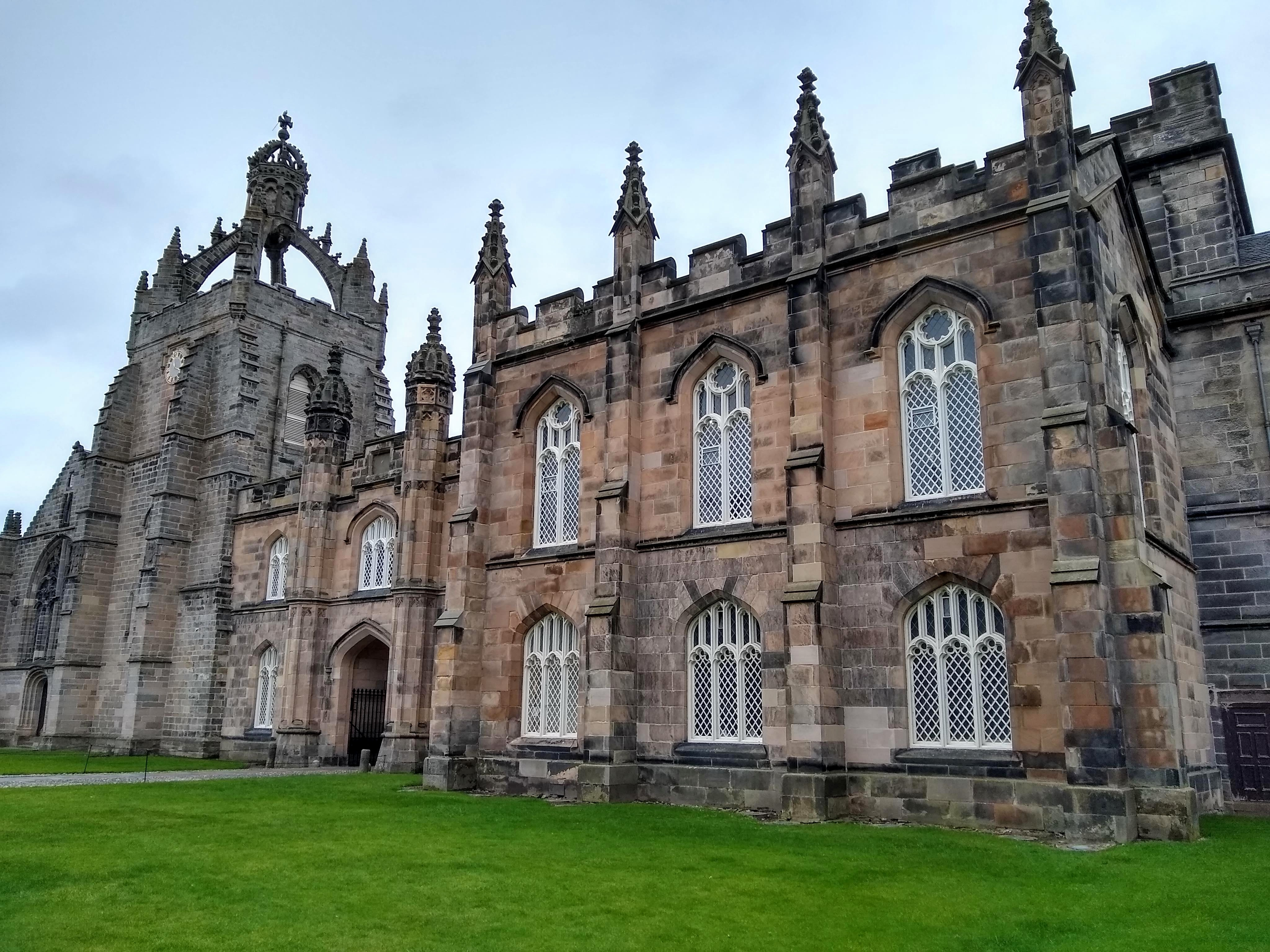
- King's College Chapel in Aberdeen
- Occasion: 500th anniversary of the King's College Chapel
- Text: Gradual Locus iste
- Language: Latin
- Composed: 2009
- Scoring: SATB choir

Locus iste (English: This place), is a sacred motet composed by Paul Mealor in 2011. The text is the Latin gradual Locus iste for the annual celebration of a church's dedication. Mealor set it for four unaccompanied voices, at times divided, for the 500th anniversary of the King's College Chapel in Aberdeen in 2009.

== History ==
The Welsh composer Paul Mealor, professor of composition at the University of Aberdeen from 2003, composed Locus iste for the 500th anniversary of the King's College Chapel in 2009.

== Text and music ==
The Latin text of Locus iste is the gradual Locus iste, part of the proper of the mass for the anniversary of a church's dedication. The incipit, Locus iste a Deo factus est, translates to "This place was made by God".

The motet is scored for an unaccompanied choir which is at times divided.

Locus iste a Deo factus est,
inaestimabile sacramentum,
irreprehensibilis est.

This place was made by God,
a priceless sacrament;
it is without reproach.

The duration is given as 6:29 minutes.

Locus iste was recorded by Tenebrae as part of a collection, A Tender Light, of choral music by Mealor in 2011. It was recorded by the Choir of King's College, Aberdeen, in 2016 as part of the collection O Sacrum Convivium of contemporary sacred music.
