= Deborah Rutter =

American arts executive

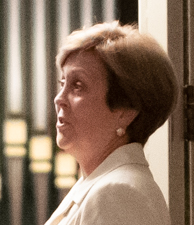

President of the John F. Kennedy Center for the Performing Arts
- In office September 2014 – February 2025
- Preceded by: Michael Kaiser
- Succeeded by: Richard Grenell

Personal details
- Born: Pennsylvania, U.S.
- Spouse: Peter Ellefson
- Children: 1
- Education: Stanford University (BA); University of Southern California (MBA)

Deborah F. Rutter (born September 30, 1956) is an American arts executive. She was the president of the John F. Kennedy Center for the Performing Arts in Washington, D.C. from September 2014 to February 2025. Rutter was the first woman to head the Center, overseeing the Center's operations in presenting theater, dance, music, awards, and the affiliated, National Symphony Orchestra and Washington National Opera. She came to the Center from serving as the president of the Chicago Symphony Orchestra (2003–2014), an American orchestra commonly referred to as one of the "Big Five".

She is currently Vice Provost for the Arts at Duke University.

== Early life ==
Rutter was born in Pennsylvania and raised in Encino, Los Angeles. She is the daughter of attorney and choral administrator Marshall Rutter and his first wife Winifred Hitz. She played piano and violin and participated in youth orchestras in Los Angeles. To help out the youth orchestra, her mother Winifred took classes in orchestral management. Rutter graduated from Stanford University in 1978, where she studied music and German. For a year, she studied in Vienna and played there in a community orchestra. Applying for her first arts executive job, with a letter in German to its German born head, Ernest Fleischmann, she was hired by the Los Angeles Philharmonic Orchestra. She worked there from 1978 to 1986. During that time, Rutter obtained a master's degree in business administration from the University of Southern California.

== Career ==
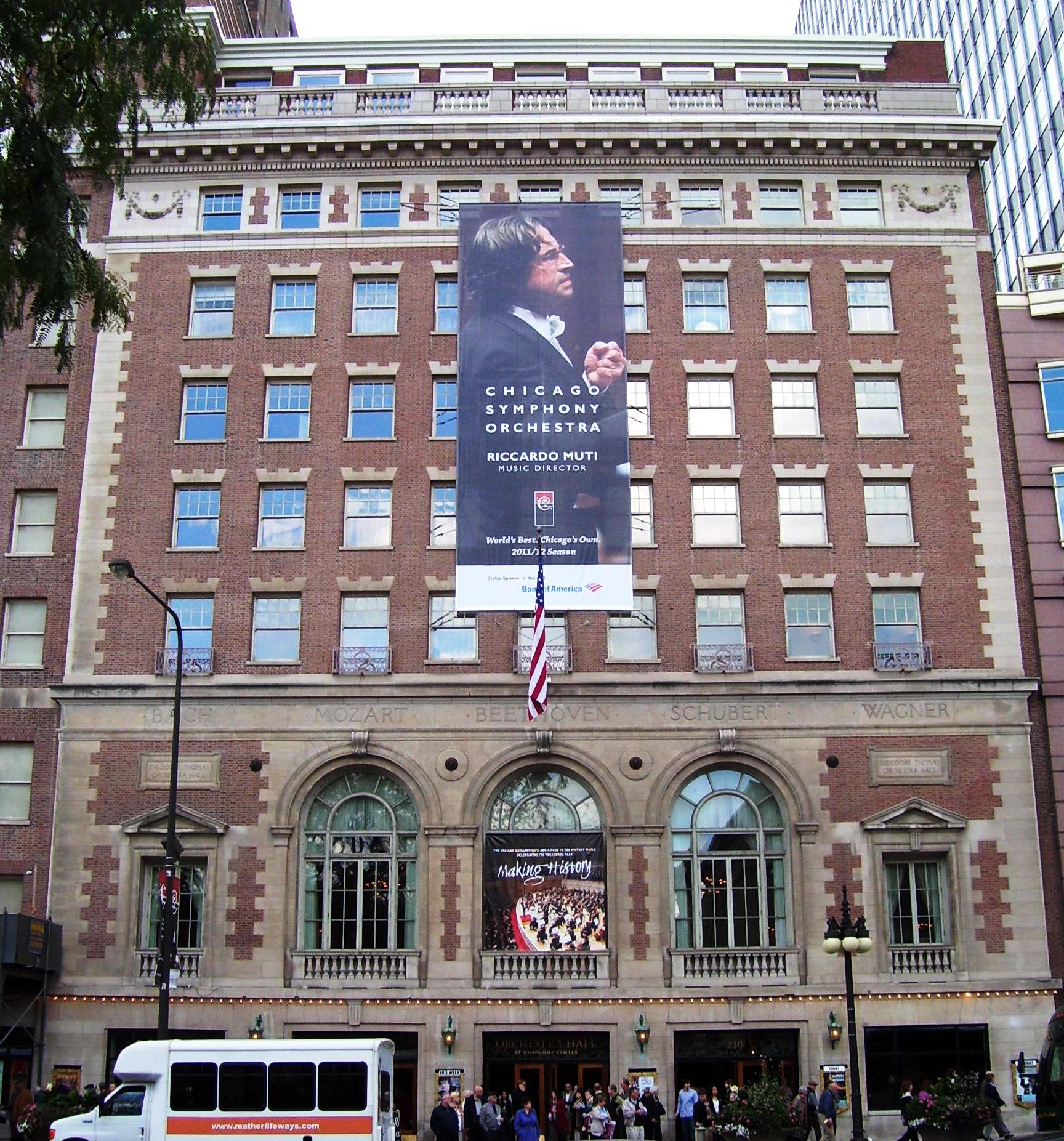
Riccardo Muti banner on Chicago's Orchestra Hall. Rutter was praised for recruiting Muti.

In 1986, Rutter was hired to head the Los Angeles Chamber Orchestra, where she remained until 1992. In 1992, Rutter refused to renew the contract of Iona Brown as principal conductor; Brown later returned after Rutter's departure. She then became the executive director of the Seattle Symphony Orchestra. In Seattle, she oversaw the construction of Benaroya Hall, the orchestra's new home. She successfully worked to increase the Seattle Symphony Orchestra's visibility and endowment.

Rutter was named to head the Chicago Symphony Orchestra Association in 2003. According to arts management professor, Philippe Ravanas, she overhauled the orchestra's finance practices and reversed a financial decline. She was later instrumental in attracting Riccardo Muti as the orchestra's music director, and Yo-Yo Ma as creative consultant. Ma credits Rutter with making the orchestra and its music more accessible through performance and education beyond the major concert. During her tenure, the orchestra was hurt by a severe economic recession but her stewardship helped the organization to successfully weather it. In 2012, she settled a two-day musicians' strike. Her latter years at the orchestra included record fundraising and ticket sales. While in Chicago, she was named to the top 100 list of most powerful Chicagoans by Chicago magazine; she has held the chair of the policy committee of the League of American Orchestras, and has served as a board member for the Solti Foundation. Rutter remained with the orchestra until June 2014.

=== Kennedy Center presidency ===
Rutter became president of the Kennedy Center on September 1, 2014. She became the first woman to head the large, partially federally-funded, performing arts organization that includes many different types of performances and programs, as well as being a presidential memorial.

In the beginning of her tenure, she led the project to create the REACH, the first physical expansion of the Kennedy Center. The $250 million project was based on the assumption that people would want to meet with artists in a more casual setting which consists of a large and outstanding outdoor space designed by Steven Holl.

In 2018, Rutter launched DIRECT CURRENT, a festival of contemporary culture which focused on new and interdisciplinary art. Over her tenure, she has expanded the Center’s programming, notably bringing in Q-Tip as the first artistic director of hip-hop culture.

As part of the Center’s 50th anniversary season celebration, Rutter oversaw the creation and 2022 opening of the permanent exhibit Art and Ideals: President John F. Kennedy. In January 2025, aged 68, she announced her intention to step down at the end of the year. Her 11-year tenure was noted for expanding the center both physically and programmatically. In February 2025, Rutter was dismissed as president of the Kennedy Center shortly after Donald Trump was made chairman of the organization, and as he dismissed almost all the Center's leadership. In March, she was announced to be the recipient of Washington, D.C.'s Arena Stage American Voice Award for her "extraordinary leaders[hip]" in the arts and arts education.

=== Duke University ===
In July 2025, Rutter was appointed Vice-Provost for the Arts at Duke University, effective 1 September 2025.

=== Other activities ===
Rutter holds professional membership or board positions for Vital Voices, and the International Academy of Digital Arts and Sciences. She is an elected member of the American Academy of Arts and Sciences. She has served the Academy on its board of directors, and as co-chair of its Arts Commission.

== Personal life ==
Rutter is married to university professor and trombonist, Peter Ellefson. Previously, she went by the name Deborah Rutter Card due to a former marriage. She has one daughter, Gillian (born 1998).
