= Donald Howard (priest) =

Anglican priest

Donald Howard AKC (1927 - 2007) was an Anglican priest, most notably Provost of St Andrew's Cathedral, Aberdeen from 1978 until 1991.

Howard was born on 21 January 1927, trained for the priesthood at King's College London; and ordained in 1960. After a curacy at Saltburn-by-the-Sea he was Director of the South Bechuanaland Mission from 1962 to 1965; then Rector of St John, East London from 1965 to 1971. He was Rector of Haddington from 1972 to 1978.

Religious titles
Preceded by Arthur Edward Hodgkinson	Provost of St Andrew's Cathedral, Aberdeen; 1978 –1991	Succeeded by William David Wightman
