= St Andrew's Cathedral, Aberdeen =

Coordinates: 57.1491°N 2.0931°W

St Andrew's Cathedral
- The Cathedral Church of Saint Andrew
- Cathair-eaglais Naomh Anndra
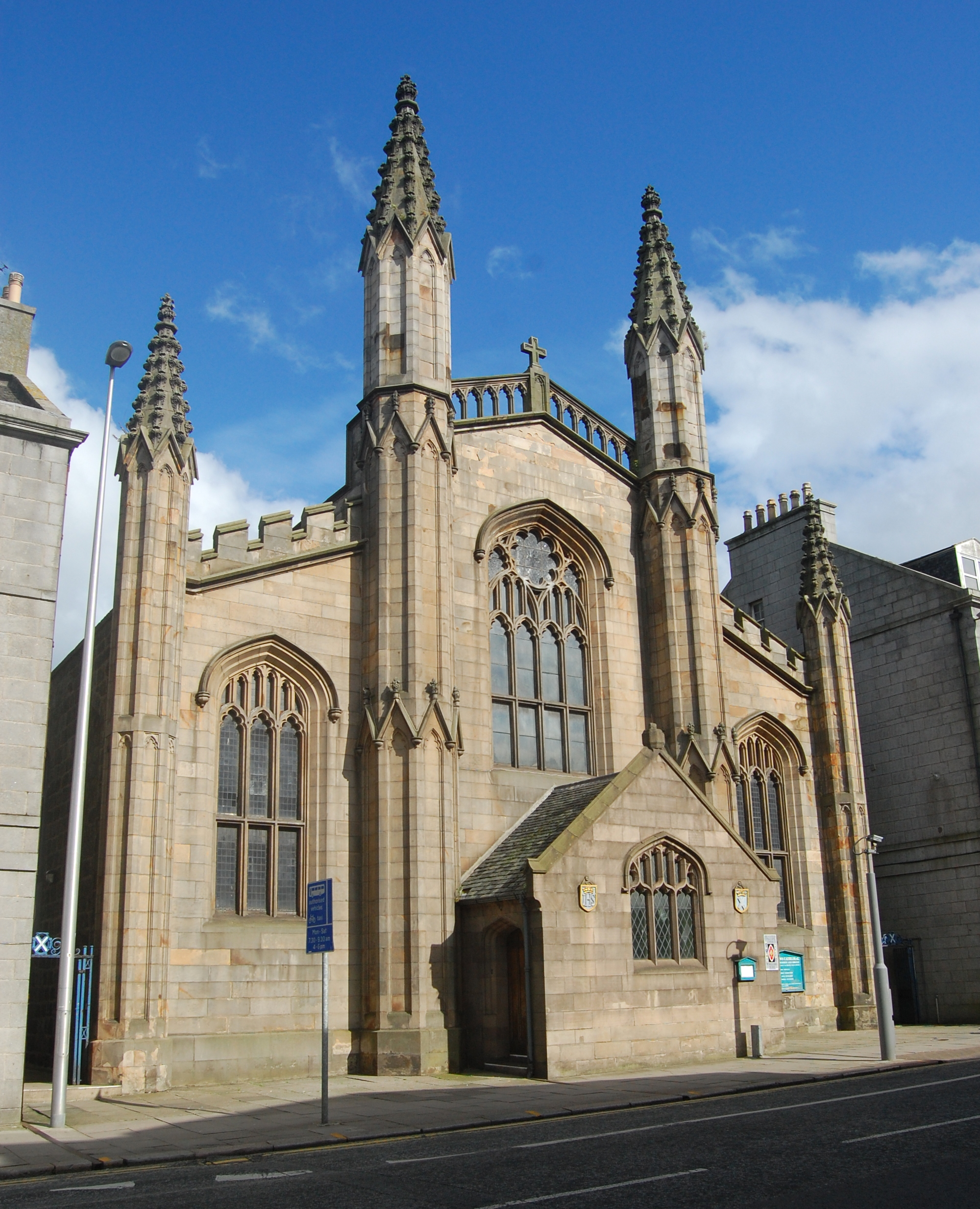
- St Andrew's Cathedral
- Location: Aberdeen
- Country: Scotland
- Denomination: Scottish Episcopal Church
- Website: standrewsaberdeen.org

History
- Dedication: St Andrew

Administration
- Diocese: Aberdeen & Orkney

Clergy
- Bishop: Anne Dyer

St Andrew's Cathedral (Scottish Gaelic: Cathair-eaglais Naomh Anndra), or the Cathedral Church of Saint Andrew, is a cathedral of the Scottish Episcopal Church situated in the Scottish city of Aberdeen. It is the see of the Bishop of Aberdeen and Orkney, who is the Ordinary of the Diocese of Aberdeen and Orkney.

It is a Category A listed building.

== Origin ==
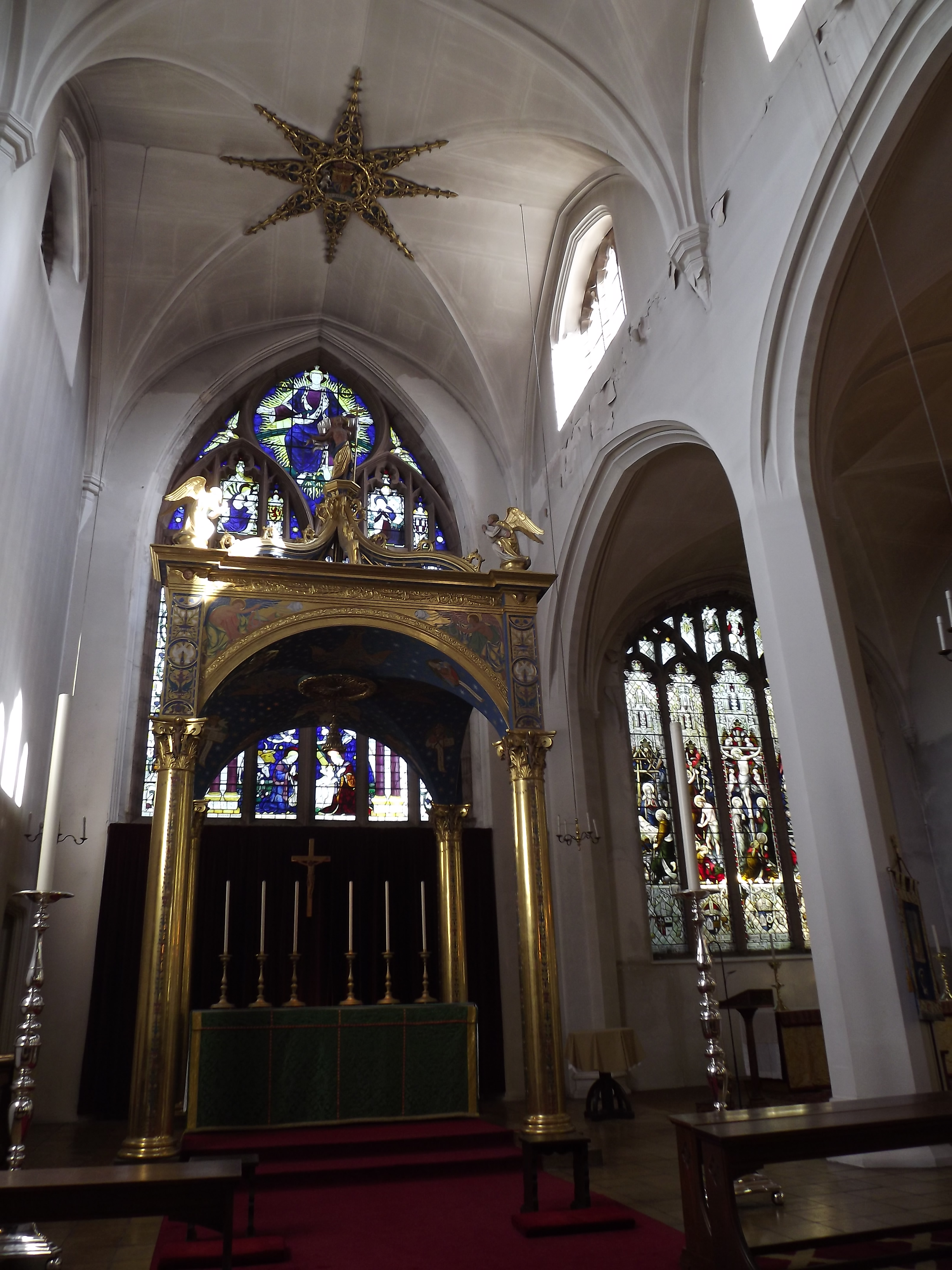
The cathedral high altar in 2012

The origin of St Andrew's Cathedral dates back to a time before the 1688 deposition of James VII (James II of England) when new laws meant that Scottish Episcopalians were required to give up their church buildings. This was done because of the supposed ongoing support for James among Scotland's Episcopalians. The new laws also made the building of Episcopal churches illegal and limited the size of congregations.

The earliest records for the St Andrew's congregation date to 1716 when Andrew Jaffrey, formerly parish priest of Alford, became priest of this congregation, but their meeting places are unknown until 1776 when Bishop John Skinner (1744–1816) built his house in Long Acre with an upper room to be used as a chapel. Following a repeal of the restrictive religious laws in 1792 Saint Andrew’s Chapel was built next to Skinner’s house where the congregations worshipped for 25 years.

== The present building ==
The present church building opened in 1817 and was raised to cathedral status in 1914. The original building was designed in the perpendicular Gothic style by architect Archibald Simpson, one of Simpson's many commissions in the city. While three sides of the cathedral were built out of the local granite, for which Aberdeen is famous, the facade of the structure, facing King Street, Aberdeen, was built from sandstone for economical reasons despite Simpson's opposition. Thus, the cathedral comprised nave and flanking aisles with sandstone ashlar to the King Street elevation and snecked granite rubble to the rear. The chancel was added by George Edmund Street, 1880 and the porch by Robert Lorimer in 1911.

During the 1930s, the cathedral was renovated to commemorate the 150th anniversary of the consecration in Aberdeen of Samuel Seabury (1729–96) as the first bishop of the Episcopal Church in the United States of America, an event which took place on the site currently occupied by Aberdeen City Council's headquarters.

At this time the plan was to create an elaborate, cruciform building with central tower, paid for by a gift of the Episcopal Church in the United States of America. However, the Wall Street crash halted this plan. Instead the cathedral was enlarged and embellished by Ninian Comper. Comper's decorative scheme is largely intact; it includes a vaulted ceiling with decorative panels depicting the arms of the then 48 US states and local families. The chancel has a large gold-painted baldachino and carved oak screen.

In 1938, the US ambassador Joseph Kennedy, accompanied by his 21-year-old son John F. Kennedy, opened an extension to the building.

== Temporary closure ==
In April 2020, church officials said that financial difficulties could mean that the cathedral might not re-open after the COVID-19 pandemic. In June 2020, Bishop Anne Dyer and the Cathedral Trustees and Chapter announced that the cathedral would close temporarily from September 2020, because of problems with the fabric of the building. The congregation continued to gather for worship online.

The cathedral reopened for worship on Sunday, 5 December 2021, with an inaugural service of Advent Carols. The congregation continues to gather for worship on Sundays at 10.45am and on Thursdays at 10am.

== Churchmanship ==
Until the late 1970s and early 1980s, the cathedral was Anglo-Catholic in tradition. In 1982, the cathedral provost, Donald Howard, declared in a sermon the cathedral would remove the large crucifix and four of the six candles on the high altar for Lent so that the altar could be free-standing to permit a 'westward' celebration of the Eucharist, celebrant facing the congregation rather than back to the people. Worship has since become more "broad" in nature, whilst retaining the dignity of cathedral worship.

== Notable people ==
- Samuel Seabury (1729–96) was the first bishop of the Episcopal Church in the United States of America, Samuel Seabury was ordained in 1784. Seabury was consecrated bishop by Robert Kilgour, Bishop of Aberdeen and Primus of Scotland; Arthur Petrie, Bishop of Ross and Moray; and John Skinner, coadjutor bishop of Aberdeen. The consecration took place in "an upper room" of the house of Skinner, then leader of the St Andrew's congregation, approximately 500 metres from the present cathedral. The approximate site of the house is marked by a polished granite tablet on the wall of Marischal College.

== Cathedral clergy ==
=== Canons ===
- Revd Canon Captain Gerry Bowyer
- Revd Canon Neil Brice
- Revd Canon Vittoria Hancock
- Revd Canon Jeremy Paisey
- Revd Canon John Walker

=== Provosts ===
- Andrew Jaffray
- James Milne
- 1735–1774: William Smith
- John Skinner
- William Skinner
- Stephen Allen
- John Ryde
- Thomas Suther
- Henry Ley Greaves
- 1882–1909: Myers Danson
- 1910–1912: William Perry
- 1914–1932: Henry Erskine Hill
- 1932–1955: Gordon Kinnell
- 1955–1965: Paddy Shannon
- 1965–1978: Arthur Hodgkinson
- 1978–1991: Donald Howard
- 1991–2002: David Wightman
- 2003–2015: Richard Kilgour
- 2015–present: Isaac Poobalan

== Cathedral music ==
=== Organists ===
- James Davie (1783-1857). 18?–18?:
- Mrs Christian Hunter ca. 1836 (daughter of James Davie)
- Thomas Berry (1818-1892) ca. 1848
- Thomas Henry Allwood 1852 - 1853
- R.H. Baker 1853 - ????
- John Adlington (1839-1884) ca. 1868 - 1877
- William Morrison 1877 - 1880 (formerly organist at St Mary’s Episcopal Church)
- George Cummings Dawson (1859–1916) F.R.C.O. 1880 - 1886 (Headmaster of the Aberdeen High School for Girls 1893–)? (afterwards organist of Holborn West Church, Aberdeen)
- Thomas Cooke 1887 - 1913
- T.E. Wright 1913 - 1916 (afterwards organist of South United Free Church, Aberdeen)
- Harold E. Bennett (1881–1938) F.R.C.O. 1916 - 1938 (Senior music master at the High School for Girls, Aberdeen 1917–?)
- George Alfred Trash (1902–1961) L.R.A.M. A.R.C.O. L.T.C.L. 1938 - 1961
- John Gavin Cullen (1936–2022) M.A. F.R.C.O. A.R.C.M. 1961 - 1964 (Assistant music master at Aberdeen Grammar School, 1961–64.)
- Frederick William Fea 1964 - 1966
- Richard Galloway 1966 - 1968
- David McGinnigle 1968 - ca. 1973
- G. Geoffrey Pearce 1974 - 1984 (formerly organist of St Mark's Church, Aberdeen)
- Andrew Morrisson Ph.D 1984 - 2000
- Christopher Cromar 2020 - 2021
- Colin Stuart (B.Mus G.B.S.M. A.R.C.O. P.G.C.E.) 2025

=== Organs ===
The first organ associated with St Andrew's was installed in 1795 in the 'upper room' chapel in Long Acre and was the work of the London organ builder Samuel Green (1740–96). This organ was moved to the newly built chapel in King Street in 1817 but was soon replaced after being damaged by fire.

The second organ (1818) was made by the firm of Bruce of Edinburgh and comprised 2 manuals and pedals. In 1871 ithis instrument was rebuilt and enlarged to 3 manuals by the firm of Bryceson of London. Further work was undertaken in 1917 by Hill, Norman & Beard of London and in 1970 by Rushworth & Dreaper of Liverpool.

== See also ==
- Religion in Scotland
- St Machar's Cathedral – the original cathedral in Aberdeen, now a High Kirk of the Church of Scotland
- St Mary's Cathedral – cathedral of the Roman Catholic Diocese of Aberdeen
