= Paul Mealor =

Welsh composer (born 1975)

Professor Paul Mealor LVO CStJ FRSA FRSE CLJ
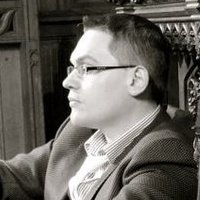
- Mealor in 2009
- Born: 25 November 1975 (age 50); St Asaph, Denbighshire, Wales, UK
- Education: Royal Danish Academy of Music
- Alma mater: Alcuin College, York
- Occupations: Composer and teacher
- Website: paulmealor.com

Paul Mealor LVO CStJ FRSA FRSE CLJ FLSW (born 25 November 1975) is a Welsh composer. A large proportion of his output is for chorus, both a cappella and accompanied. He came to wider notice when his motet Ubi Caritas et Amor was performed at the wedding of Prince William and Catherine Middleton in 2011. He later composed the song "Wherever You Are", which became the 2011 Christmas number one in the UK Singles Chart. He has also composed two operas, four symphonies, concerti and chamber music.

== Biography ==
Born in St Asaph, Denbighshire, Wales, Mealor studied composition privately with William Mathias and John Pickard and then read music at the University of York (1994–2002). He studied composition at York with Nicola LeFanu, and in Copenhagen at the Royal Danish Academy of Music with Hans Abrahamsen (1998–99).

From 2003 to 2024 he was Professor of Composition at the University of Aberdeen. In 2003 he founded the University of Aberdeen Music Prize for composition.

He took early retirement in October 2024 and the university honoured him with a lifetime Emeritus Professorship. Since October 2023 he has been the Artistic Director of the North Wales International Music Festival.

He has held visiting professorships in composition in institutions in Scandinavia and the United States. He is a Fellow of the Royal Society of Arts and since 2011 has been published by Novello. Also in 2011, he signed to Decca Records. His first album for Decca, A Tender Light – a collection of sacred choral anthems – spent six weeks at No 1 in the Classical charts.

Mealor's motet, a setting of Now Sleeps the Crimson Petal (rearranged as Ubi Caritas et Amor), was commissioned by Prince William for his marriage to Catherine Middleton at Westminster Abbey on 29 April 2011, when it was sung by the Choirs of Westminster Abbey and Her Majesty's Chapel Royal conducted by James O'Donnell. Later that year, Mealor was commissioned to write the music for Wherever You Are, a song setting a text compiled from letters written to British Army military personnel deployed on active service in the Afghanistan War by their wives or partners, as part of the BBC Two television series The Choir: Military Wives. The single, released on 19 December 2011, became the 2011 Christmas number one in the UK Singles Chart and raised money for military charities. In the 2012 Classic FM Hall of Fame, he was voted the 'nation's favourite living composer' and succeeded in achieving the highest placing of any new entry in the history of the Hall of Fame with Wherever You Are charting at No 5.

In 2012, he was appointed a Free Burgess of the City of Aberdeen.

In 2013, Mealor composed the song "With a friend like you" for the final of the second season of the BBC 2 series "The Choir: Sing while you work". All three choirs of the final presented the song at Ely Cathedral. The P&O choir was declared winner.

In April 2014, Mealor's follow up album to "A Tender Light" titled "I Saw Eternity" was released. It reached No 1 in the Specialist classical charts.

In September 2014, it was announced that he had been appointed President of Tŷ Cerdd (which promotes Welsh Music to the world), and Patron of the Welsh Music Guild.

In January 2018, he was appointed as an Officer of the Venerable Order of St John (OStJ) by HM Queen Elizabeth II. In March 2023 he was promoted to Commander (CStJ) by HM King Charles III.

In May 2019, he was appointed to the Order of the Scottish Samurai (OSS) at Great Shogun Level.

In March 2020, he was appointed a Commander of The Catholic Order of St Lazarus of Jerusalem (CLJ) and in November 2020 he was awarded The Saltire Society Fletcher of Saltoun Award for his outstanding contribution to arts and humanities in Scotland. He is only the second composer, after Sir James MacMillan to be given the award.

In 2021, he composed, along with Grahame Davies (as lyricist), the official hymn for Her Majesty's Royal Air Force, Per Ardua ad Astra.

Mealor's compositions featured in three of the four national services of thanksgiving for the life of the late Queen Elizabeth II in September 2022. His, 'I shall not Die but Live' (a setting of Psalm 118 in Scots Gaelic) was written especially for the service and sung by Karen Matheson at Giles Cathedral, Edinburgh. His 'A Welsh Prayer' was also sung at Llandaff Cathedral at the Welsh National Service of thanksgiving.

In 2023, Mealor was commissioned to create a brand new piece for the Coronation of Charles III and Camilla. His work, "Coronation Kyrie" – set in the Welsh language – was sung by Welsh bass-baritone Sir Bryn Terfel – the first time that the Welsh language was sung at a Coronation.

Also in 2023, he was commissioned to compose three works for the Presentation of the Honours of Scotland to Charles III – Balmoral Flourishes, a Gaelic Psalm setting and the closing recessional march, The Call of Lochnagar. For this, he was appointed Lieutenant of the Royal Victorian Order (LVO) in the 2024 New Year Honours.

It was announced in January 2026 that he was appointed a Lay Canon of St Asaph's Cathedral.

In September 2026 he was awarded the Wales Care Awards' Sir Bryn Terfel Foundation Award for Promoting the Arts in Social Care by Sir Bryn Terfel CBE himself at St Asaph Cathedral.

In October 2026 he was commissioned by BBC Radio 3 to compose a new work to mark the 60th anniversary of the Aberfan disaster. His requiem for hope, Aberfan: From Darkness to Light was first performed by the BBC National Orchestra and Chorus of Wales, Ynysowen Primary School, Ysgol Cymraeg Rhyd Y Grug, Ynysowen Male Voice Choir and Mark Lewis Jones (Narrator) conducted by Timothy Redmond in Aberfan Community Centre and Hoddinott Hall, Cardiff.

In October 2026 it was announced that Mealor is the new Composer in Association with the BBC National Orchestra and Chorus of Wales and will be composing new works for them over the coming years and leading their composition education projects.

== Selected works ==
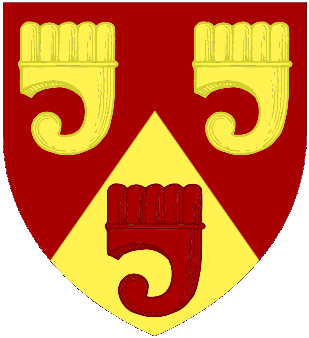
Arms granted by the Lyon Court in 2023.

- Aberfan: From Darkness to Light (2026). Commissioned by BBC Radio 3 to mark the 60th anniversary of the Aberfan disaster. First performed by the BBC National Orchestra and Chorus of Wales, Ynysowen Primary School, Ysgol Cymraeg Rhyd Y Grug, Ynysowen Male Voice Choir and Mark Lewis Jones (Narrator) conducted by Timothy Redmond in Aberfan and Cardiff.
- The Weather of My Being (2025). Commissioned to mark the twentieth wedding anniversary of Their Majesties King Charles III and Queen Camilla and first performed for Their Majesties at Crathie Kirk, Balmoral in August 2025 by Caritas Choir conducted by the composer.
- The Light of Paradise - Fourteen Devotions of Margery Kempe (2023). First performed by the Zurich Chamber Singers and sonic.art in Schaffhausen, Switzerland on 14 January 2024.
- Gelert – A Community Opera (Singers, chorus and small ensemble. Duration: 45 minutes.). Commissioned and premiered at the North Wales International Music Festival in September 2021.
- Symphony No 4 'At the haunted end of day' (Orchestra, 2022. Duration: 20 minutes). Commissioned and premiered by the Welsh Chamber Orchestra in June 2022 conducted by Anthony Hose.
- Wonders of the Celtic Deep (Orchestra & Chorus, 2021. Duration: 240 minutes). Orchestral score for the four-part BBC Wales/ OneTribe TV series.
- Piano Concerto (Orchestra, 2020. Duration: 20 minutes). Commissioned by JAM on the Marsh and the North Wales International Music Festival and Premiered in August 2020 by John Frederick Hudson (Piano) and the London Mozart Players conducted by Michael Bawtree.
- Symphony No 3: Illumination (Orchestra, 2018. Duration: 40 minutes). Commissioned by the BBC National Orchestra of Wales and premieres by them at Hoddinott Hall, Cardiff, 30 November 2018
- Euphonium Concerto (Orchestra, 2017. Duration: 16 minutes). Commissioned by the Welsh Proms and premiered by David Childs (Euphonium) and the Royal Philharmonic Orchestra conducted by Owain Arwel Hughes CBE at St David's Hall, Cardiff, July 2017.
- Symphony No 2: Sacred Places (Orchestra, 2016. Duration: 25 minutes). Commissioned by the North Wales International Music Festival and premiered by the New Sinfonia conducted by Robert Guy in September 2016
- Symphony No 1: Passiontide (soprano and baritone soloists, chorus and orchestra, 2015. Duration: 1 hour and 10 minutes). Libretto by Peter Davidson. Commissioned and premiered by Jillian Bain Christie (soprano), Sean McCarther (Baritone), the University of Aberdeen Chamber Choir and the Orchestra of Scottish Opera, conducted by James Jordan on 19 November 2015 at St Machar's Cathedral, Aberdeen.
- Celtic Prayers (children's choir, chorus & orchestra, 2014). Libretto by Grahame Davies. Commissioned by the BBC and first performed by the BBC National Chorus and Orchestra of Wales at St David's Hall Cardiff on 1 March 2014.
- The Farthest Shore (chorus, boys choir, brass & organ, 2013). Libretto by Ben Kaye. Commissioned by the John Armitage Memorial and first performed in St David's Cathedral on 28 May 2013.
- Crucifixus (baritone, chorus and optional accompaniment, 2012).
- Wherever You Are (chorus, 2011).
- Ubi Caritas et Amor (chorus, 2011). A revised setting of Now Sleeps the Crimson Petal.
- Now Sleeps the Crimson Petal (4 madrigals)(chorus, 2010). Commissioned by the John Armitage Memorial Trust and first performed by the combined choirs of St Salvator's (St Andrews) Chapel Choir, University of Aberdeen Chamber Choir and Edinburgh University Chamber Choir, conducted by Michael Bawtree in Holy Trinity Church, St Andrews, October 2010.
- She Walks in Beauty (chorus, 2010). Text by Lord Byron, written for Octavoce.
- Sanctuary Haunts (chorus, 2009). Commissioned by University of Aberdeen and first performed by Polyphony (choir) and Stephen Layton on 5 February 2010.
- Stabat Mater (chorus & piano, 2009). Revised version (chorus, harp and string orchestra, 2010) premiered by the St Andrews Chorus and Heisenberg Ensemble, conducted by Michael Downes, St Andrews, November 2010.
- Between Eternity and Time (soprano & piano, 2008). Three Settings of Emily Dickinson commissioned by Irene Drummond and Alasdair Beatson and first performed by them at King's College Chapel, Aberdeen on 6 November 2008.
- Let Fall the Windows of Mine Eyes (chorus, 2008). Commissioned by the Voices of Shakespeare Festival (Brecon) and first performed by Con Anima on 12 July 2008 at the Living Willow Theatre, Brecon.
- The Shadows of Dreams (soprano, cello & piano, 2007). First performed by Sarah Leonard (soprano), Ian Mitchell (Clarinet) and Huw Watkins (Piano), Elphinstone Hall, Aberdeen, 20 April 2008.
- Aurora Lucis Rutilat (organ, 2006). Composed for Roger Williams (organist) and first performed by him at King's College, Cambridge, February 2007
- Liturgy of Fire (symphonic wind ensemble, 2006). Commissioned and first performed by the New York University Wind Ensemble conducted by Christian Wilhjelm at the Frederick Loewe Theatre, New York on 6 December 2006.
- De Profundis (organ, 2005). Commissioned by George Chittenden and first performed by him at St Patrick's Cathedral, Dublin, 6 August 2005.
- Borderlands (piano trio, 2004). First performed by the Chagall Trio at the University of Manchester.
- And Profoundest Midnight Shroud The Serene Lights of Heaven (chorus, 2002). Text by Rilke and Shelley. Commissioned by and first performed by York Vocal Index, directed by John Potter, at the Sir Jack Lyons Hall, York, May 2002.
- Elegy for a Play of Shadows (2001). Version 1 (cor anglais and harp) first performed by Eamonn O'Dwyer at Sir Jack Lyons Hall, York. Version 2 (cor anglais and five instruments) first performed by the Britten Sinfonia conducted by Nicholas Cleobury in Canterbury, November 2001.
- Hidden Arias (2001) (oboe). First performed by Melinda Maxwell at Dartington Hall, August 2001.
- Rising of The Sixfold Sun (orchestra, 2000). First performed by the BBC National Orchestra of Wales conducted by Thomas Dausgaard, St David's Hall, Cardiff, February 2000.

== Discography ==
- Madrigali: Fire & Roses (Divine Art DDA 25094) Con Anima Chamber Choir directed by Paul Mealor. Includes Mealor's Now Sleeps the Crimson Petal and Morten Lauridsen's Madrigali and Chanson Éloignée.
- Mealor: Stabat Mater (Campion Cameo 2083) – Irene Drummond (soprano); Drew Tulloch (piano) Con Anima Chamber Choir/Paul Mealor. Includes Stabat Mater; Let Fall the Windows of Mine Eyes; Between Eternity and Time; Beata es, Virgo Maria; Lux Benigna; Ave.
- Borderlands (Campion Cameo 2053) – Chagall Trio. Includes Mealor's Borderlands.
- Christmas Favourites from Aberdeen (KCL 2009) – Chapel Choir of King's College, Aberdeen/ Roger Williams (organist). Includes Mealor's Locus Iste.
- A Tender Light (Decca Classics 4764814) – Tenebrae and the Royal Philharmonic Orchestra conducted by Nigel Short. Includes Now Sleeps the Crimson Petal, She Walks in Beauty, O Vos Omnes, Stabat Mater, Salvator Mundi, Ubi Caritas.
- I Saw Eternity (Decca Classics 4810494) – Tenebrae and the Aurora Orchestra conducted by Nigel Short. Includes Peace, I Saw Eternity and Crucifixus.
- Immortal Memory – A Burns Night Celebration (Vox Regis) – University of Aberdeen Chamber Choir conducted by the composer
- Serenity (GIA Publications CD-1078) – The Same Stream, conducted by James Jordan (conductor)
- O Sacred Heart for strings (2023) – Royal Philharmonic Orchestra, Owain Arwel Hughes on Welsh Music for Strings, Rubicon RCD1198 (2025)
