= David Wightman (priest) =

William David Wightman is an Anglican priest: he was Provost of St Andrew's Cathedral, Aberdeen from 1991 until 2002.

Wightman was born on 29 January 1939, educated at the University of Birmingham and Wells Theological College; and ordained in 1964. After a curacy in Castlechurch he was Vicar at Buttershaw from 1970 to 1976; and of Cullingworth from 1976 to 1983. After this he was Rector of Peterhead then Longside before his time as Provost.

Religious titles
Preceded by Donald Howard	Provost of St Andrew's Cathedral, Aberdeen; 1991 –2002	Succeeded by Richard Kilgour
