= Roger Williams (organist) =

British organist

Roger Bevan Williams, MBE (born 1943) is a Welsh organist and musicologist. In 2010, he retired as Master of Ceremonial Music and Organist to the University of Aberdeen, a music department in which he had been a member for over 30 years.

== Biography ==
Born in Swansea, Wales, Williams began his musical education at the Huddersfield School of Music. He graduated with BMus Honours from the University of Wales (University College Cardiff) before proceeding to Goldsmiths' College, University of London. At King's College, Cambridge he gained his PhD for his research into the early works of Arnold Schoenberg-.

Williams spent eight years in London working as a freelance musician, combining the roles of conductor, organist, harpsichordist, singer and composer. He held various church posts and ran a small opera company, sang ad hoc with the BBC Singers, and played at the main London music venues.

He was for a short time the Head of the Chiswick Evening Music Centre, while lecturing at the West London Institute. In 1978 he took up the post of Lecturer in the Music Department at Aberdeen University. He was later appointed Senior Lecturer and Head of Department. Following the closure of the Music Department in Aberdeen (now re-established) he was appointed Music Director and Organist to the University.

Williams continues to teach and work in Aberdeen where he has enjoyed a long association with the Haddo House Choral & Operatic Society and the North East of Scotland Music School. He was made MBE in the UK Honours list of 2009. Recognising his many years of service and astounding number of recitals at their institution, Williams was made an honorary Doctor of Music from the University of Aberdeen in July 2011.

He is honorary adviser in music to the National Trust for Scotland.

== Professional life ==
For the first 15 years of his appointment in Scotland, Williams also held the post of Organist at the Church of Our Lady of Victories, Kensington High Street where he advised on the rebuilding of an 1870s Willis organ. Previously he had been an Assistant Organist at Holy Trinity Church Brompton, then Organist at St. Patrick’s Soho Square, and Music Director and Organist at the Sacred Heart Church, Wimbledon.

During the 1980s he was Chorus Master to the Scottish National Orchestra (now RSNO), working with conductors such as Alexander Gibson, Neeme Järvi, Yuri Ahronovich, Gary Bertini, Norman Del Mar, Christopher Seaman, Simon Rattle, Esa-Pekka Salonen, Bryden Thomson, Richard Hickox, and Yan Pascal Tortelier. The chorus gave the first broadcast of Britten's War Requiem on Italian radio on a tour to Turin and, on a tour to Jerusalem, the world premier of its first commission, Pipes of Peace by Eddie McGuire.

In 1990 he was appointed Organist to the University of Aberdeen and had the Harrison and Harrison organ in the Chapel at King's College, Aberdeen revoiced and tuned to an unequal temperament. As Master of Ceremonial Music he helped to acquire the new Aubertin for the chapel. He has since commissioned several leading composers to write pieces specially conceived for this instrument. Among the new organ music pieces Williams has commissioned are John McLeod's The King’s Toccata; Timothy Raymond's Nocturne; Peter Relph's Les Anges Encerclant; Sofia Gubaidulina's Hell und Dunkel; Stephen Montagu's Behold, A Pale Horse; Claire Singer's A FÀS SOILLEIR; Pete Stollery's b3:dz; and Joe Stollery's A Squabble of Mews.

For ten years from 1997 he conducted the newly re-formed Aberdeen Sinfonietta in its performances as a chamber orchestra at the Music Hall in Aberdeen. He also planned and directed the free weekly "Lunchbreak Concerts" for the City of Aberdeen at Aberdeen Art Gallery’s Cowdray Hall for 15 seasons from 2003 onwards.

On 31 August 2010, he retired as Master of Chapel and Ceremonial Music to the University of Aberdeen. During his time in this role, he played at some 375 university graduation ceremonies, 1000 chapel services, and 1500 weddings.

On 16 September 2010, Williams performed during the Papal Mass at Bellahouston Park, Glasgow, as part of Pope Benedict XI's tour of the United Kingdom.

In 2016, he became organist of the Cathedral Church of St Machar, Aberdeen.

Currently, Williams remains a visiting pianoforte and organ tutor to students at the University of Aberdeen and the North East of Scotland Music School. He continues to perform across Aberdeenshire, directing ensembles and undertaking further academic research on the music collections of Scottish castles and country houses.
