= O magnum mysterium (Palestrina) =

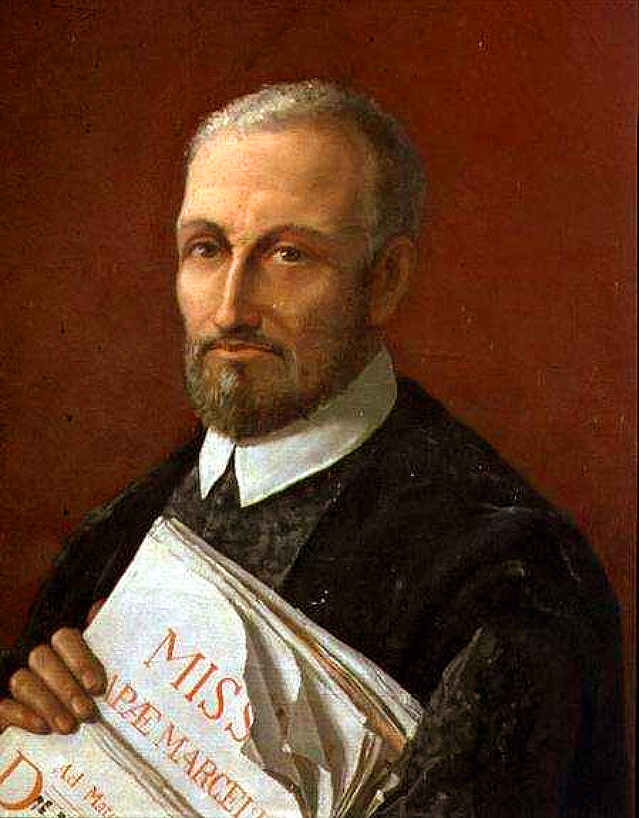
Portrait of Giovanni Pierluigi da Palestrina, 16th century

O magnum mysterium (1569) is a six-part motet by Giovanni Pierluigi da Palestrina, based on the responsorial chant of the same name, and was written for the celebration of Christmas. The piece is intended to express the joy and awe that was felt by the shepherds as they celebrated and worshiped the Christ-child in the manger on Christmas Eve. Palestrina took the text for this piece from the first half of the third and fourth Responsories of Matins on Christmas Day. The text has been set many times by numerous composers, such as Palestrina, Poulenc, Lauridsen, and Morales.

== History ==
O magnum mysterium is a six-voice motet in the Aeolian mode in two musical parts. It was published in 1569 in Rome and formed a part of a collection of motets for five-, six- and seven voices, known as his Liber Primus Motettorum. Palestrina wrote it for Christmas to express the joy and awe of the shepherds as they celebrated Christ’s birth. Palestrina wrote this motet during times when complaints were being made about the plainness of religious works. He wrote it as a response against the complaints. He furthered the bounds of complexity by writing his choral compositions for six parts, and yet he made the Catholic liturgical music less complex by using fewer melismas and letting the voices sing the same syllables at the same time.

O magnum mysterium is a responsorial chant from the Matins of Christmas. Palestrina used the first half of the third and fourth Responsories of the Matins on Christmas Day. It is a simple polyphonic work in which most of the voices sing the same syllables on the same beats.

== Text ==
The text of O magnum mysterium, in all its settings, is the same. The text is in Latin and refers to the Bible's story of Christ in the manger. It was specially chosen as a celebration of the birth of Jesus Christ from the Virgin Mary and to illustrate God’s grace and mercy to sinners. Lauridsen explained his use of music in combination with text which led to the words being highlighted at important parts. He explained how, on the word “Virgo,” which means Virgin in Latin, the alto’s sing a dissonant G-sharp appoggiatura, the only note not of the tonic in the whole piece. This is done to focus attention on the importance of the symbolism behind the Virgin Mary and her part in the birth of the Saviour. Palestrina highlights the text in a different way - through repetition.

| | Latin | English |
| First Part | O magnum mysterium et admirabile sacramentum ut animalia viderent Dominum natum iacentem in praesepio. Natum vidimus et chorus angelorum collaudantes Dominum. Alleluia. | O great mystery and wonderful sacrament, that beasts should see the new-born Lord lying in a manger. The new-born we have seen and a chorus of angels praising God. Alleluia. |
| Second Part | Quem vidistis pastores? Dicite, annunciate nobis quis apparuit? natum vidimus et chorus angelorum collaudantes Dominum. Alleluia. | Whom have you seen, shepherds? Speak, tell us who has appeared? The newborn we have seen and a chorus of angels praising God. Alleluia. |

== Structural Analysis ==
O magnum mysterium sheet music

Palestrina scored this motet for an unaccompanied choir in six parts (SSAATB). While the motet is broadly set in the mode of A Aeolian, this composition can be considered “freely-composed” and is very harmonic in writing style. Palestrina gives the idea of the tonal areas of the motet by starting with three different chords; e minor, a minor and in d minor. Palestrina does not use a diatonic key, but freely employs accidentals.

Bars 1 to 3 are in E Mixolydian, and in bar 4 it changes to the Phrygian mode before ending with a Phrygian cadence (a form of the "imperfect" cadence) in D (bar 7). In bar 8, it changes to D Mixolydian and there is another Phrygian cadence in bar 11. Bar 15 ends on yet another Phrygian cadence, after which it modulates to D and changes to E in bar 19. At these cadence points, it can be seen that one voice remains a lead through to the other side of the cadence, while the others resolve cadentially, creating a movement through the cadence, and diminishing stagnation of the piece at cadence points.

Melodically, Palestrina employs many syllabic unisons in this motet and not much imitation between the voices. There is therefore a clarity of text and diction impossible in imitative counterpoint. As a result, there is not much dissonance in the work, and that which does occur is normally due to enharmonic notes in a syllabic melisma. All of this creates a piece which feels crisp and clear, reflecting the holy idea of the birth of Jesus depicted in the text.

Palestrina does, however, make use melodic and rhythmic motives in this motet, and uses word painting to exhibit the lyrics. An example of this can be seen in the repetition of “ut animalia viderent Dominum”. The voices sing the phrase independently in syllabic unison, emphasising their importance through repetition. The repetition of the note can rather be seen as a declaration (a very short statement of form) instead of calling it a “real motif”. The idea of repetition is, however employed throughout the motet:

- “magnum mysterium” – bar 4 to 5 is echoed in bar 8 to 9.
- Melodically: “et admirabile” – bar 11 to 13, and 15 to 16
- “et choros angelorum” – From bar 42 to 51 is repeated in bar 52.

The motet begins in duple meter, and changes to triple meter in bar 52 at the opening of the "Alleluia" section, and then changes back to duple meter at its closure for the beginning of the second big section of the piece.

The final “Alleluja” section is lively and the voices no longer sing in unison and all voices sound independently. Palestrina makes use of scale patterns and variations, which are common in his other works. This can be seen in bar 141, in which quarter notes are used and sung in different variations as melismas. Finally, Palestrina ends the motet with a very strong plagal cadence.
