= Bruce Whiteman =

Canadian poet, translator, and essayist

Bruce Whiteman (born David Bruce Whiteman, June 18, 1952) is a Canadian poet, translator, editor, and essayist whose writings focus on music, bibliography, cultural history, and literature. Born in Southern Ontario and educated at Trent University and the University of Toronto, in 1996 Whiteman was appointed director of the William Andrews Clark Memorial Library at the University of California, Los Angeles, a position he held until 2010. Currently Whiteman lives in Peterborough, Ontario, and contributes book reviews and essays regularly to publications such as TriQuarterly, Rattle, and the Los Angeles Review of Books.

== Poetry ==
Although he has published extensively as a rare books librarian, scholar, and critic, Whiteman has called writing poetry "the part of my life I'm most passionate about." Known primarily as a prose poet who has been compared to fellow Canadian poets Christopher Dewdney and bpNichol, Whiteman's opus magnum is The Invisible World is In Decline, a continuing long poem he began working on in 1981 and which was first published in 1984; the ninth and final volume was published in 2022. A 2015 publication entitled Tablature marked Whiteman's return to the sort of verse poetry that characterized much of his earlier work.

== Selected publications ==
Poetry

- The Invisible World Is in Decline, Book IX. Toronto: ECW Press, 2022.
- The Sad Mechanic Exercise. Kentville, NS: Gaspereau Press, 2019.
- Tablature. Montreal: McGill-Queen's University Press, 2015.
- Intimate Letters. Toronto: ECW Press, 2014.
- The Invisible World Is in Decline, Books I-VI. Toronto: ECW Press, 2006.
- Tristia. Pasadena: Vero Press, 2002.
- XXIV Love Poems. Sherman Oaks: Ninja Press, 2002.
- The Invisible World Is in Decline, Book V. Toronto: ECW Press, 2000.
- The Forger Contemplates Rossetti. Los Angeles: Lyceum Press, 2000.
- Visible Stars: New and Selected Poems. Dorion: The Muses' Company, 1995.
- Zukofsky Impromptus. Toronto: Sin Tax, 1995.
- Polyphonic Windows. Montreal: Poets & Painters Press, 1993.
- The Invisible World Is in Decline, Books II-IV. Toronto: Coach House Press, 1989.
- En avoir fini avec le corps seul. Le Sambuc: La Presse des Poètes et des Peintres d'Outre-Mer, 1987.
- A Nature Murder. Hamilton: Poets & Painters Press, 1985.
- Recesses in the Heart: The Thera Poems. Toronto: blewointmentpress, 1984.
- The Invisible World Is in Decline. Toronto: Coach House Press, 1984.
- The Cold Engineering of the World. Toronto: League of Canadian Poets, 1983.
- The Thera Poems. North Walsham: Warren House Press, 1982.
- 10 Lessons in Autobiography. Guelph: Gryphon Press, 1981.
- Inventions. Toronto: Three Trees Press, 1979.
- The Sun At Your Thighs, The Moon At Your Lips. Toronto: Piraeus Press, 1978.
- 12 Poems, 12 Drawings. With M.W. Jewell. Toronto: Poets & Painters Press, 1978.

Translation

- Tiberianus. Pervigilium Veneris. New York: Russell Maret, 2009.
- Catullus. LXXXV/CV: Two Poems in Five Essays. Fullerton: Lyceum Press, 2006.
- François Charron. After 10,000 Years, Desire: Selected Recent Poems. With Francis Farley-Chevrier. Toronto: ECW Press, 1995.

Cultural History

- Work To Be Done: Selected Essays and Reviews. Windsor: Biblioasis, 2024.
- Ken Norris's Report: An Essay. Peterborough: Poets & Painters Press, 2024
- Reading Wide and Deep: The Canadian Long Poem: A Conversation. Peterborough: Poets & Painters Press, 2022. (With Ken Norris)
- Best Canadian Essays 2021. Windsor: Biblioasis, 2021.
- The World from Here: Treasures of the Great Libraries of Los Angeles. Los Angeles: UCLA Armand Hammer Museum, 2001. Edited by Bruce Whiteman and Cynthia Burlingham.
- J.E.H. Macdonald. Kingston: Quarry Press, 1995.
- Lasting Impressions: A Short History of English Publishing in Quebec. Montreal: Véhicule Press, 1994.
- The Letters of John Sutherland, 1942-1956. Toronto: ECW Press, 1992.
- A Bibliography of Macmillan of Canada Imprints 1906-1980. Toronto: Dundurn Press, 1985.
- Raymond Souster and His Works. Toronto: ECW Press, 1985.
- Raymond Souster: A Descriptive Bibliography. Ottawa: Oberon Press, 1984.
- A Literary Friendship: The Correspondence of Ralph Gustafson and W.W.E. Ross. Toronto: ECW Press, 1984.
- Leonard Cohen: An Annotated Bibliography. Downsview: ECW Press, 1980.
