= O magnum mysterium =

Religious text for Christmas

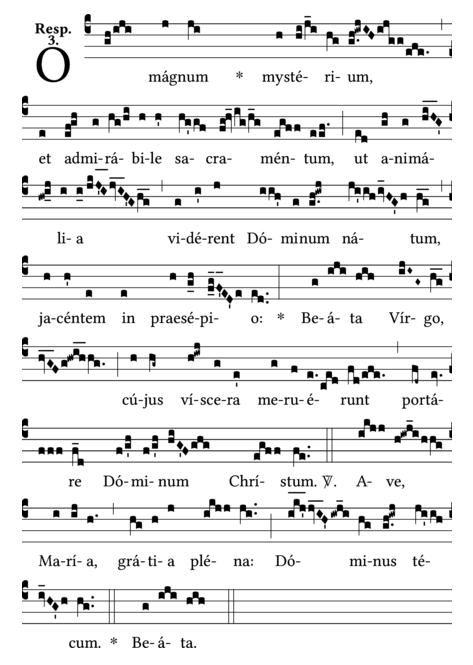
Gregorian responsory O magnum mysterium

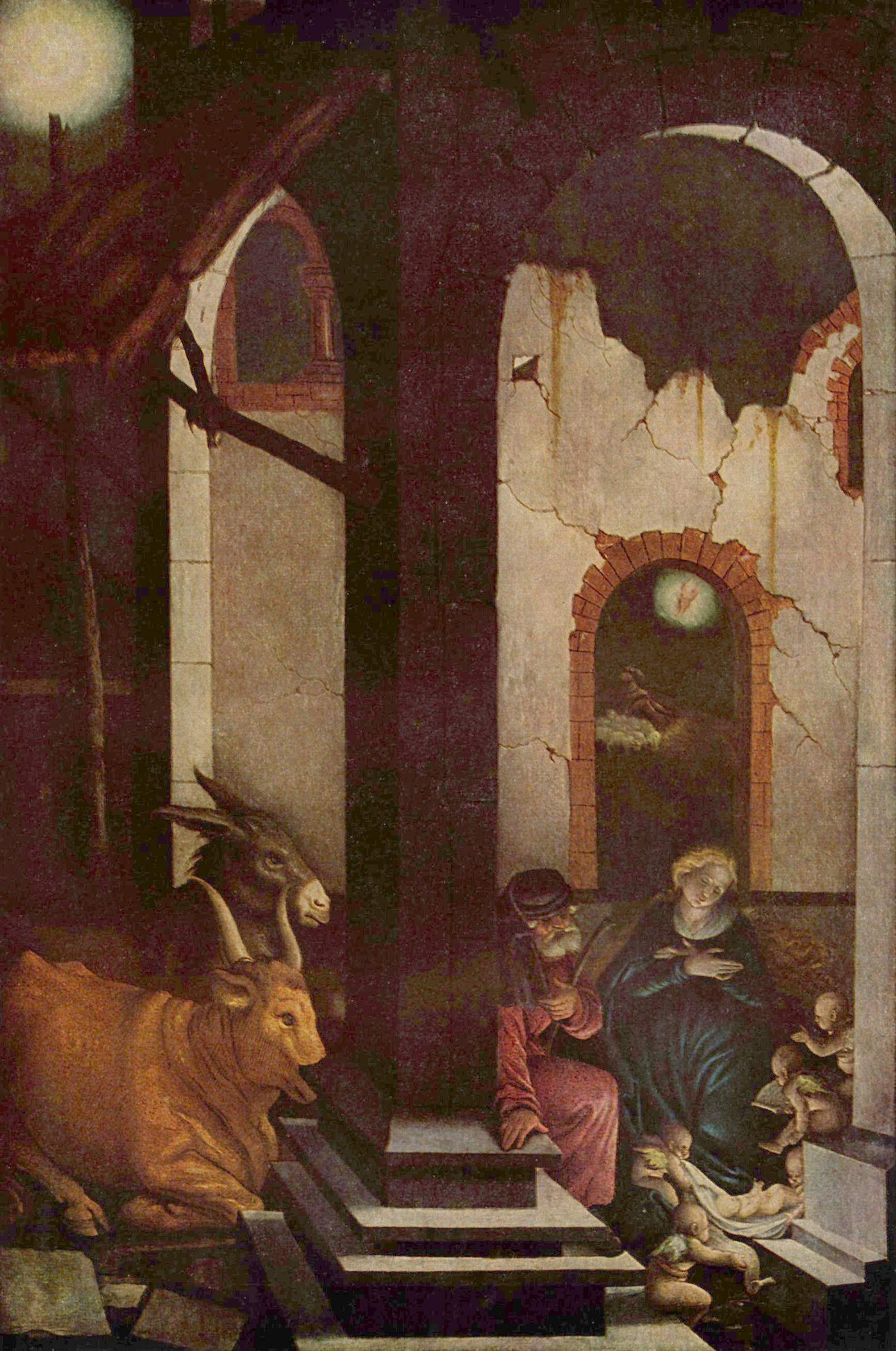
Painting of the Nativity scene, by Hans Baldung (1520)

O magnum mysterium is a responsorial chant from the Matins of Christmas.

== Text ==
The text is drawn from the Matins of Christmas in the Roman Breviary.

Latin text

O magnum mysterium,
et admirabile sacramentum,
ut animalia viderent Dominum natum,
iacentem in praesepio!
O beata virgo, cuius viscera
meruerunt portare
Dominum Christum.
Alleluia!

English translation

O great mystery,
and wonderful sacrament,
that animals should see the newborn Lord,
lying in a manger!
O blessed virgin, whose womb
was worthy to bear
the Lord Jesus Christ.
Alleluia!

In the original responsorial chant, the first line of Ave Maria is also included: "Ave Maria, gratia plena, dominus tecum".

== History ==
The image of the oxen and donkey next to the crib is found in Isaiah (Isa. 1.3) and is traditionally related to the nativity scene at the birth of Jesus in Luke 2. Luke (Lk 2.7) does not mention animals, but a manger. In the apocryphal Gospel of Pseudo-Matthew, both animals are specifically named. The image continued to spread from the 13th century onwards when it was included in the Golden Legend. It became the most popular symbol for the mystery of the self-abasement of God in his Incarnation. (Phil 2,6–7).

The second part of the responsory is a versicle which is based on the words with which Elizabeth welcomes Mary on her visitation (Lk 1.42–43). Most polyphonic settings of the text omit the versicle. The setting by Cristóbal de Morales includes a different versicle.

David Thompson states that "the origin of this Nativity poem is in itself a great mystery. It is not a biblical text. The poem/chant was incorporated in mediaeval times into the Divine Office as the fourth of the nine Responsories for Matins on Christmas Day." He conjecturally dates its incorporation to the liturgical reforms of Pope Gregory VII.

== Choral settings ==
O magnum mysterium has an associated plainchant melody, and in this form has been sung since the middle ages. However, the text has appealed to many composers over the years. Some of the earliest settings are by Paolo Aretino (1508-1584), Adrian Willaert (c. 1490 – 7 December 1562) and Nicolas Gombert (c. 1495 – c. 1560), which were published in the mid 1500s. Many of the most notable composers of the renaissance made settings, including William Byrd, Jacob Clemens non Papa, Cristóbal de Morales, D. Pedro de Cristo, Palestrina (article on the setting) and Tomás Luis de Victoria. Victoria went on to publish a mass based on his motet in 1592.

Composers continued to set the text in the ensuing centuries, including Jan Dismas Zelenka, but none of the notable composers of the 19th century made a setting.

The text became popular again in the twentieth century, with notable settings by Francis Poulenc and more recently Morten Lauridsen and Marcus Paus. The Choral Public Domain Library carries a list of roughly fifty choral settings.
