= Morten Lauridsen =

American composer (born 1943)

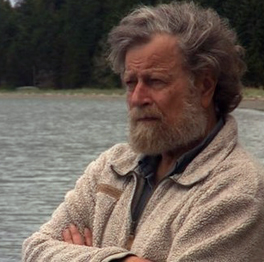
- Lauridsen on Waldron Island in 2012
- Born: February 27, 1943 (age 83); Colfax, Washington, U.S.
- Occupations: Composer; Conductor; Teacher
- Organizations: USC Thornton School of Music
- Awards: National Medal of Arts

Morten Johannes Lauridsen III (born February 27, 1943) is an American composer and teacher. A National Medal of Arts recipient (2007), he was composer-in-residence of the Los Angeles Master Chorale from 1994 to 2001, and is professor emeritus of composition at the USC Thornton School of Music, where he taught for fifty-two years until his retirement in 2019.

== Biography ==
A native of the Pacific Northwest, Lauridsen worked as a Forest Service firefighter and lookout on an isolated tower near Mount St. Helens. He attended Whitman College for 2 years, before traveling south to study composition at the University of Southern California with Ingolf Dahl, Halsey Stevens, Robert Linn, and Harold Owen. He began teaching at USC in 1967.

In 2006, Lauridsen was named an "American Choral Master" by the National Endowment for the Arts. In 2007, he received the National Medal of Arts from President George W. Bush in a White House ceremony, "for his composition of radiant choral works combining musical power, beauty, and spiritual depth that have thrilled audiences worldwide."

His works have been recorded on more than 200 CDs, five of which have received Grammy Award nominations, including O Magnum Mysterium by the Tiffany Consort, A Company of Voices by Conspirare, Sound The Bells by The Bay Brass, and two all-Lauridsen discs entitled Lux Aeterna by the Los Angeles Master Chorale led by Paul Salamunovich and Nocturnes with the Polyphony choir and the Britten Sinfonia conducted by Stephen Layton.

A recipient of numerous grants, prizes, and commissions, Lauridsen chaired the composition department at the USC Thornton School of Music from 1990 to 2002 and founded the school's advanced studies program in film scoring. He has held residencies as guest composer/lecturer at over 100 universities and has received honorary doctorates from Oklahoma State University, Westminster Choir College, King's College, University of Aberdeen, and Whitman College. In 2014 he was invited to be honorary artistic president of Interkultur/World Choir Games. In 2016 he was awarded the ASCAP Foundation Life in Music Award. In late February 2020, via an update on his Facebook page, Lauridsen revealed he had retired from the Thornton School of Music in the spring of 2019, after having taught classes there for over 50 years.

Lauridsen divides his time between Los Angeles and his home in the San Juan Archipelago off the northern coast of Washington State.

== Compositions ==
His eight vocal cycles and two collections—Les Chansons des Roses (Rilke), Mid-Winter Songs (Graves), A Winter Come (Moss), Madrigali: Six "FireSongs" on Italian Renaissance Poems, Nocturnes (Rilke, Neruda, and Agee), Cuatro Canciones (Lorca), Four Madrigals on Renaissance Texts, A Backyard Universe, Five Songs on American Poems (Moss, Witt, Gioia, and Agee) and Lux Aeterna—his series of sacred a cappella motets (O magnum mysterium, Ave Maria, O Nata Lux, Ubi caritas et amor, and Ave Dulcissima Maria) and numerous instrumental works are featured regularly in concert by artists and ensembles throughout the world. O Magnum Mysterium, Dirait-on (from Les Chansons des Roses), O Nata Lux (from Lux Aeterna), and Sure On This Shining Night (from Nocturnes) are best-selling choral octavos.

His musical approaches to the texts he sets are diverse, ranging from direct to abstract in response to characteristics (subject matter, language, style, structure, historical era, etc.). His Latin sacred settings, such as the Lux Aeterna and motets, often reference Gregorian chant, as well as Medieval and Renaissance techniques while blending them with contemporary sounds. Other works such as the Madrigali and Cuatro Canciones are highly chromatic or atonal. His music has an overall lyricism and is tightly constructed around melodic and harmonic motifs.

Referring to Lauridsen's religious music, the musicologist and conductor Nick Strimple said he is "the only American composer in history who can be called a mystic, [...] Lauridsen's probing, serene work contains an elusive and indefinable ingredient which leaves the impression that all the questions have been answered." From 1993, Lauridsen's music rapidly increased in international popularity, and by the end of the century he had eclipsed Randall Thompson as the most frequently performed American choral composer.

== Vocal works ==
Date	Composition/Song Cycle	Movements
2012	Prayer (On a Poem by Dana Gioia)	
2008	Canticle/O Vos Omnes	
2006	Chanson Eloignee (Rilke)	
2005	Nocturnes (written for the American Choral Directors Association's; Brock Commission)	I. Sa Nuit d'Été (Rainer Maria Rilke) II. Soneto de la Noche (Pablo Neruda) III. Sure on this Shining Night (James Agee) IV. Epilogue: Voici le soir (Rilke, added in 2008)
2004	Ave Dulcissima Maria (written for the Harvard Glee Club)	
1999	Ubi Caritas et Amor	
1997	Lux Aeterna (Text and Translation)	I. Introitus II. In Te, Domine, Speravi III. O Nata Lux IV. Veni, Sancte Spiritus V. Agnus Dei
1997	Ave Maria	
1994	O Magnum Mysterium	
1993	Les Chansons des Roses (Rilke)	I. En Une Seule Fleur II. Contre Qui, Rose III. De Ton Rêve Trop Plein IV. La Rose Complète V. Dirait-on
1987	Madrigali: Six "Firesongs" on Italian Renaissance Poems	I. Ov'è, Lass', Il Bel Viso? II. Quando Son Piu Lontan III. Amor, Io Sento L'alma IV. Io Piango V. Luci Serene e Chiare VI. Se Per Havervi, Oime
1981	Cuatro Canciones Sobre Poesias de Federico García Lorca	
1980	Mid-Winter Songs (Robert Graves)	I. Lament for Pasiphaë II. Like Snow III. She Tells Her Love While Half Asleep IV. Mid-Winter Waking V. Intercession in Late October
1976	Where Have the Actors Gone	
1970	I Will Lift Up Mine Eyes	
1970	O Come, Let Us Sing Unto the Lord	
1967	A Winter Come (Howard Moss)	I. When Frost Moves Fast II. As Birds Come Nearer III. The Racing Waterfall IV. A Child Lay Down V. Who Reads By Starlight VI. And What Of Love
1965	A Backyard Universe	

== Recordings ==
Over 200 recordings of works by Morten Lauridsen have been released, including five that have received Grammy nominations.

CDs:

Lauridsen: Lux Aeterna; Los Angeles Master Chorale; Paul Salamunovich; Grammy nomination (1998); Lux Aeterna (Orchestral Version), Les Chansons des Roses, Ave Maria, Mid-Winter Songs (Orchestral Version), O Magnum Mysterium; RCM
Lauridsen: Northwest Journey; Chamber works performed by Ralph Grierson, Jane Thorngren, Viklarbo Ensemble, Donald Brinegar Singers, Shelly Berg, Sunny Wilkinson, James Drollinger, and Morten Lauridsen; includes Where Have the Actors Gone, Dirait-on (Duet Version), Ubi Caritas et Amor, A Winter Come, Variations, Cuatro Canciones, Madrigali, and O Magnum Mysterium (Piano/Vocal Version); RCM
O Magnum Mysterium; Nordic Chamber Choir; conducted by Nicol Matt; includes the Madrigali, Lux Aeterna (Organ version), O Magnum Mysterium, and Les Chansons des Roses; Hanssler Recordings
Lauridsen – Lux Aeterna; Britten Sinfonia and Polyphony Chorus; conducted by Maestro Stephen Layton; 2005 Grammy nomination; includes the Lux Aeterna (Orchestral Version), Madrigali, Ave Maria, Ubi Caritas et Amor, and O Magnum Mysterium; Hyperion Records
Lauridsen – Nocturnes; Britten Sinfonia and Polyphony Chorus; with Morten Lauridsen, piano and Andrew Lumsden, organ; conducted by Stephen Layton; includes the Mid-Winter Songs on Poems by Robert Graves, Les Chansons des Roses (Rilke), I Will Lift Up Mine Eyes, O Come Let Us Sing Unto The Lord, Ave Dulcissima Maria, and Nocturnes
Dialogues: Musical Conversations between Composer and Conductors; 3-CD set; conversations between Morten Lauridsen and conductors Paul Salamunovich and James Jordan discussing Morten Lauridsen's compositions, with demonstrations by Lauridsen at the piano; GIA Publications
Sure On This Shining Night; Hartford chamber choir Voce and the Voce Chamber Artists; movements from six vocal cycles plus four premiere CD recordings; Lauridsen accompanies at the piano on several works; Voce Recordings
Lauridsen – Mid-Winter Songs; The Singers – Minnesota Choral Artists; contains the complete Nocturnes, Mid-Winter Songs, Four Madrigals on Renaissance Texts and Les Chansons des Roses, and Three Psalm Settings; The Singers-Minnesota Choral Artists Recordings
Prayer: The Songs of Morten Lauridsen; Jeremy Huw Williams, Paula Fan, Caryl Hughes; Cowitz Bay Recordings

== Sheet music sales and performances ==
Morten Lauridsen is currently one of America's most performed composers, with hundreds of performances each year throughout the world in venues including Carnegie Hall, Lincoln Center, Kennedy Center, Walt Disney Concert Hall, the Vatican, Sydney Opera House, and Westminster Abbey. Over one million copies of his scores have been sold and his Dirait-on, O Magnum Mysterium, and O Nata Lux have become best-selling octavos.

Recordings of Morten Lauridsen's compositions are featured regularly on radio broadcasts throughout the United States, and he is a frequent interview guest on radio and television programs, including a KCET Life and Times program, the national broadcast of "A Portrait of Morten Lauridsen" on First Art, and a nationally broadcast Christmas Day feature on NPR's Weekend Edition with Scott Simon. He has been profiled in several extended articles, including in the Los Angeles Times "Calendar", Seattle Times, Choral Journal, Choir and Organ, Chorus America's Voice, Fanfare Magazine, and the Wall Street Journal. He has received over four hundred commission requests, including from Harvard University, the American Choral Director's Association, and the Pacific Chorale, and is a frequent guest lecturer and Artist/Composer-in-Residence.

His principal publishers are Peermusic (New York/Hamburg) and Peer's affiliate, Faber Music (London).

== Teaching life ==
Years	Program	Position
1968–69	Jascha Heifetz Master Classes	Theory Instructor
1966	USC Music Preparatory Department	Established Theory Program
1970–90	Thornton School of Music Undergraduate Theory Program	Coordinator
1972–2019	USC Thornton School of Music	Full-Time Faculty
	Scoring for Motion Pictures and TV Advanced Studies Program, Thornton School of Music, USC	Founder
1990–2002	Composition department at the Thornton School of Music	Chair
Current	Thornton School of Music	Distinguished Professor of Composition

In addition to these positions, Lauridsen has served as artistic advisor on the boards of the Los Angeles Master Chorale, Dale Warland Singers, I Cantori (New York), USC Scoring for Films/TV Program, National Children's Chorus, Creative Kids Education Foundation, Volti (San Francisco Chamber Singers), New York City Master Chorale, Jacaranda, and Angeles Chorale.

== Publications ==
"It's a Still Life That Runs Deep: The Influence of Zurbaran's Still Life With Lemons, Oranges and a Rose on Morten Lauridsen's Composition 'O Magnum Mysterium'", Wall Street Journal, February 21, 2009

Foreword to Evoking Sound by James Jordan, GIA Publications, 2009

"Morten Lauridsen on Composing Choral Music," a chapter in Contemporary Choral Music Composers, GIA Publications, 2007

Liner notes for Randall Thompson—The Peaceable Kingdom, Schola Cantorum of Oxford, Hyperion Records

"Remembering Halsey Stevens," National Association of Composer Journal, 1990

== Documentary ==
The 2012 documentary film Shining Night: A Portrait of Composer Morten Lauridsen portrays the composer at his Waldron Island retreat and in rehearsals in California and Scotland. Commentaries about the composer by poet Dana Gioia, conductor Paul Salamunovich, composer/conductor Paul Mealor, composer Alex Shapiro, and conductor Robert Geary, along with performances by the San Francisco Choral Society, University of Aberdeen Choral Society and Orchestra, Con Anima Chamber Choir, and Volti, are featured. Works include O Magnum Mysterium, Lux Aeterna, Madrigali, Dirait-on, and Nocturnes, with soundtracks by Polyphony and the Britten Sinfonia (conducted by Stephen Layton), The Singers: Minnesota Choral Artists (conducted by Matthew Culloton), and the Dale Warland Singers (conducted by Dale Warland).
