= Dufftown =

Coordinates: 57.445°N 3.128°W

Dufftown: Scottish Gaelic: Baile Bhainidh; Scots: Dufftoun
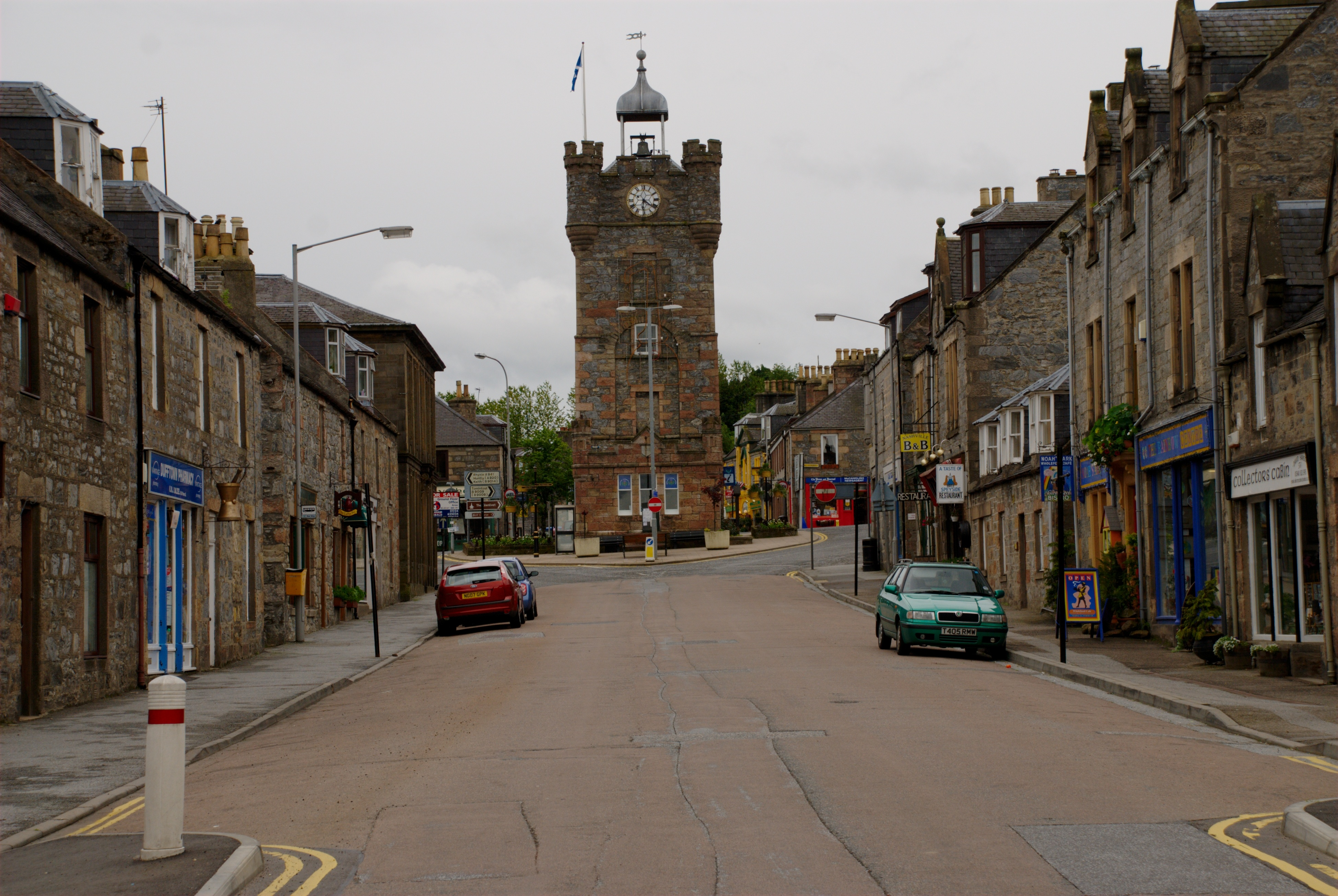
- Approaching the Dufftown Clock Tower in the middle of Dufftown

- Location within Moray
- Population: 1,515 (2022)
- OS grid reference: NJ323399
  - Edinburgh: 108 mi (174 km) SSW
  - London: 430 mi (692 km) SSE
- Council area: Moray
- Lieutenancy area: Banffshire
- Country: Scotland
- Sovereign state: United Kingdom
- Post town: KEITH
- Postcode district: AB55
- Dialling code: 01340
- Police: Scotland
- Fire: Scottish
- Ambulance: Scottish
- UK Parliament: Moray West, Nairn and Strathspey
- Scottish Parliament: Moray

Dufftown (Scottish Gaelic: Baile Bhainidh [ˈpaləˈvanɪ(j)]) is a new town and burgh in Moray, Scotland. While the town is part of the historic Mortlach parish, the town was established and laid out in the early 19th century as part of a planned new town settlement. The town has several listed 19th century buildings and serves as a regional centre for agriculture, tourism and services. The town is well known for its whisky-based economy, as it produces more whisky than any other town in Scotland and is home to several existing and former distilleries.

Dufftown had a population of 1,515 inhabitants in 2022.

== History ==
Historically part of Banffshire, Dufftown is in the ancient parish of Mortlach (Scottish Gaelic: Mòrthlach). There is evidence of Pictish settlement in the area and in approximately 566 AD, St Moluag established the first Christian church in the area, the site of the present Mortlach Parish Church. In the Middle Ages, Mortlach (in Latin Murthlacum) was an episcopal see. The Diocese of Mortlach was one of Scotland's 13 medieval bishoprics. The names of four bishops of the see are known: Beóán of Mortlach (fl. 1012), "Donercius", "Cormauch", and Nechtan, who transferred the see to Aberdeen in April 1132, during the reign of King David I of Scotland.

Balvenie Castle dates from the 13th century and is the second oldest building in the area, having been restored by John Comyn, Earl of Buchan and existing in use until 1746 when it was abandoned following the Jacobite Rebellion. Another building of historical significance is the primarily 15th century Castle of Auchindoun, which towers within the earthworks of an earlier prehistoric hill fort.

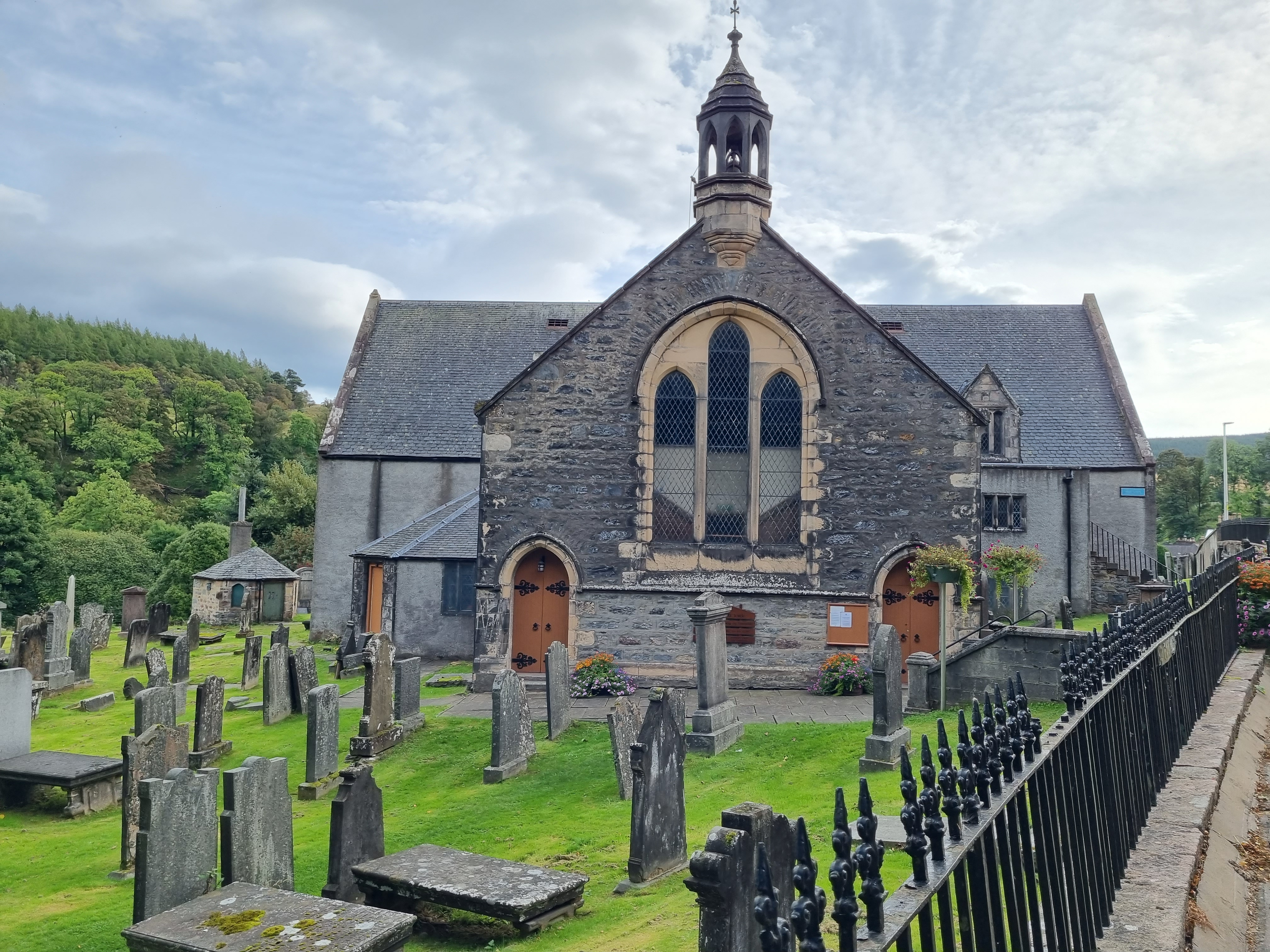
Mortlach Parish Church in the south of Dufftown is part of an older site of Christian worship from the 6th century.

While there was an earlier hamlet at Laichie and Mortlach, Dufftown as a Burgh was founded in 1817 by James Duff, 4th Earl Fife and was named after him. The town was established to help develop the Earls estate and provide both housing and employment for soldiers returning home from the Napoleonic War. The new town included the historic Mortlach settlement. The town was planned in the form of a right-angled cross or grid, with the streets running north, south, east and west from a square in the middle. This was in a similar format to other earlier Highland new town settlements such as nearby Grantown-on-Spey and Tomintoul. Properties were allocated on a Feu basis, with farming strips running away from each property, the first feu was number 3 Balvenie St.

By 1841, the town had grown to a population of 770 and the Clock Tower was built for use as a gaol and as the Burgh chambers between 1839 and 1847. A public hall was built in 1879 and this became a picture house (cinema) in the 20th century in the 1930s, before closing in the 1970s (the building survives as a restaurant). In 1890, Stephens cottage hospital was founded with funds from Lord Stephen and in 1902, a new public school was built for the town. The town continued to grow into the 19th century, reaching 1,823 people by 1901. However, by 1952, the population of Dufftown had decreased to 1,460.

== Geography ==
Dufftown lies in the centre of a long glen (valley) amid the surrounding hills, which include the granite mountain of Ben Rinnes (841 metres (2,759 ft)) to the southeast. The River Fiddich (Scottish Gaelic: Fiodhach / Abhainn Fhiodhaich) is a right bank tributary of the River Spey that runs through the glen, giving its name to the whisky Glenfiddich. The Fiddich is joined on the eastern edge of the town by the Dullan Water which drains Glen Rinnes.

The geological composition beneath most of Dufftown is that of metamorphosed Dalradian sedimentary rocks with subsidiary volcanic rocks.

The Isla Way is a 21-kilometre (13 mi) walking path that links Dufftown and the surrounding area with Keith.

=== Climate ===
Dufftown has an oceanic climate typical of Northern Scotland, characterised by relatively mild, damp winters and cool cloudy summers. The area averages 76 air frosts a year. Like much of Europe, Dufftown's climate is insulated somewhat by the Gulf Stream, a warm ocean current originating near the Gulf of Mexico. This warm ocean current makes Dufftown's climate significantly milder during the winter than expected for its latitude.

Climate data for Keith (Nearest climate station to Dufftown)1981 – 2010
Month	Jan	Feb	Mar	Apr	May	Jun	Jul	Aug	Sep	Oct	Nov	Dec	Year
Mean daily maximum °C (°F)	5.9 (42.6)	6.4 (43.5)	8.4 (47.1)	11.0 (51.8)	13.8 (56.8)	16.0 (60.8)	18.5 (65.3)	18.1 (64.6)	15.6 (60.1)	12.0 (53.6)	8.3 (46.9)	5.7 (42.3)	11.6 (53.0)
Mean daily minimum °C (°F)	−0.6 (30.9)	−0.6 (30.9)	0.8 (33.4)	2.6 (36.7)	4.9 (40.8)	7.8 (46.0)	9.8 (49.6)	9.4 (48.9)	7.2 (45.0)	4.5 (40.1)	1.8 (35.2)	−1.0 (30.2)	3.9 (39.0)
Average precipitation mm (inches)	65.7 (2.59)	57.8 (2.28)	63.2 (2.49)	59.6 (2.35)	60.8 (2.39)	77.8 (3.06)	70.6 (2.78)	75.6 (2.98)	89.2 (3.51)	100.9 (3.97)	91.9 (3.62)	64.7 (2.55)	877.8 (34.57)
Mean monthly sunshine hours	45.9	77.3	108.2	142.2	190.0	152.7	156.8	145.6	117.5	89.6	53.2	35.0	1,314
Source: metoffice

== Whisky in Dufftown ==
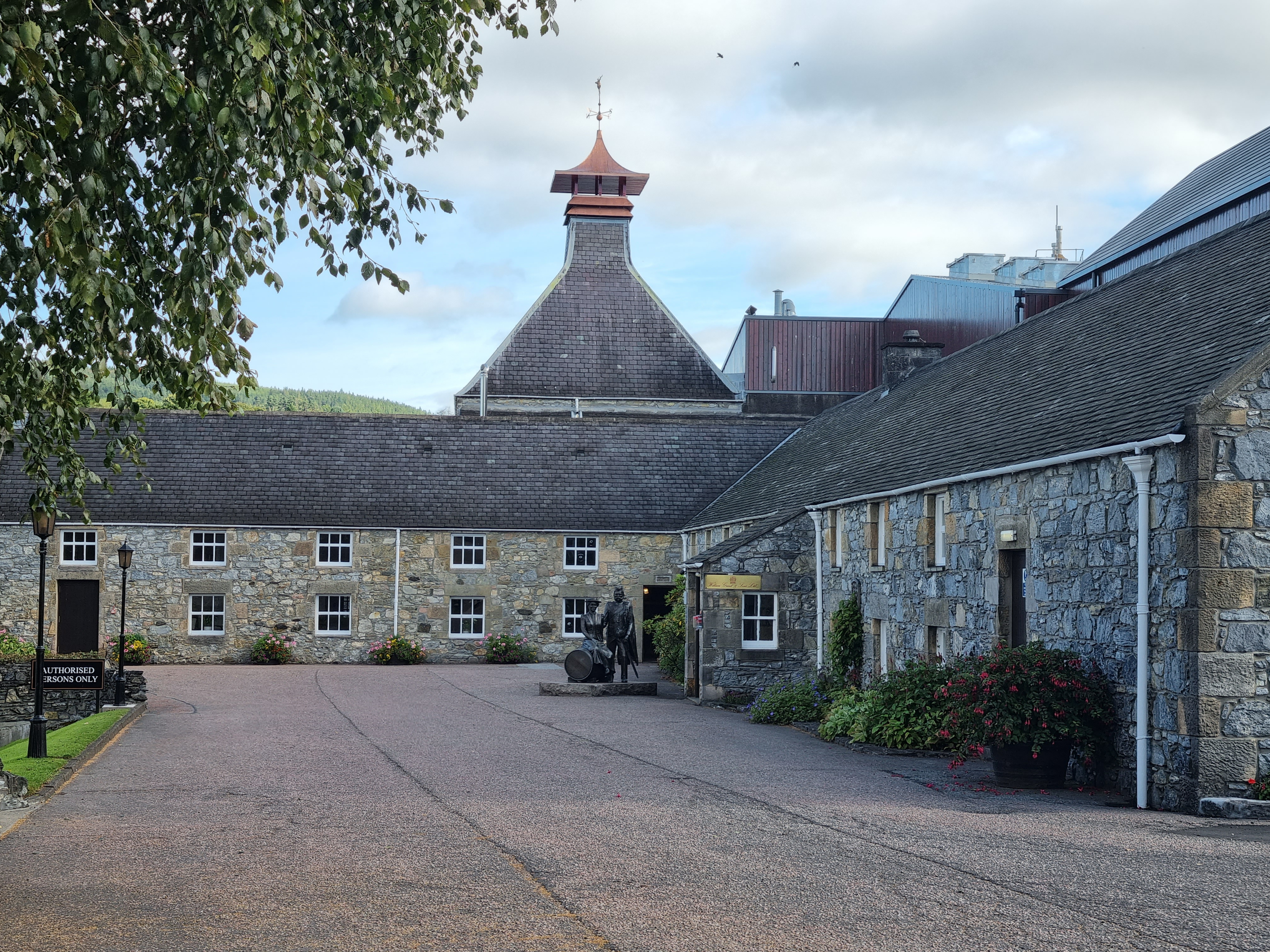
Glenfiddich, one of the whisky brands of Dufftown, established in 1886.

Dufftown is located on the River Fiddich and is the location of several Scotch whisky distilleries. It produces more malt whisky than any other town in Scotland and lays claim to the assertion that it is the “Whisky Capital of the World”, as the term is widely found in news and tourism media and can also be found on signposts on the way into the town. Accordingly, there is a popular rhyme that goes ‘Rome was built on seven hills, Dufftown stands on seven stills.’

The largest and best known of the many surrounding distilleries is the Glenfiddich distillery that distills Glenfiddich single malt Scotch whisky. The Glenfiddich distillery is owned by William Grant & Sons, Dufftown's largest employer. This proliferation puts it on the famed Malt Whisky Trail, which also includes Keith, Glen Grant Distillery, Marypark, and Tomintoul.

The town has a small whisky history museum and heritage centre, which is currently undergoing restoration.

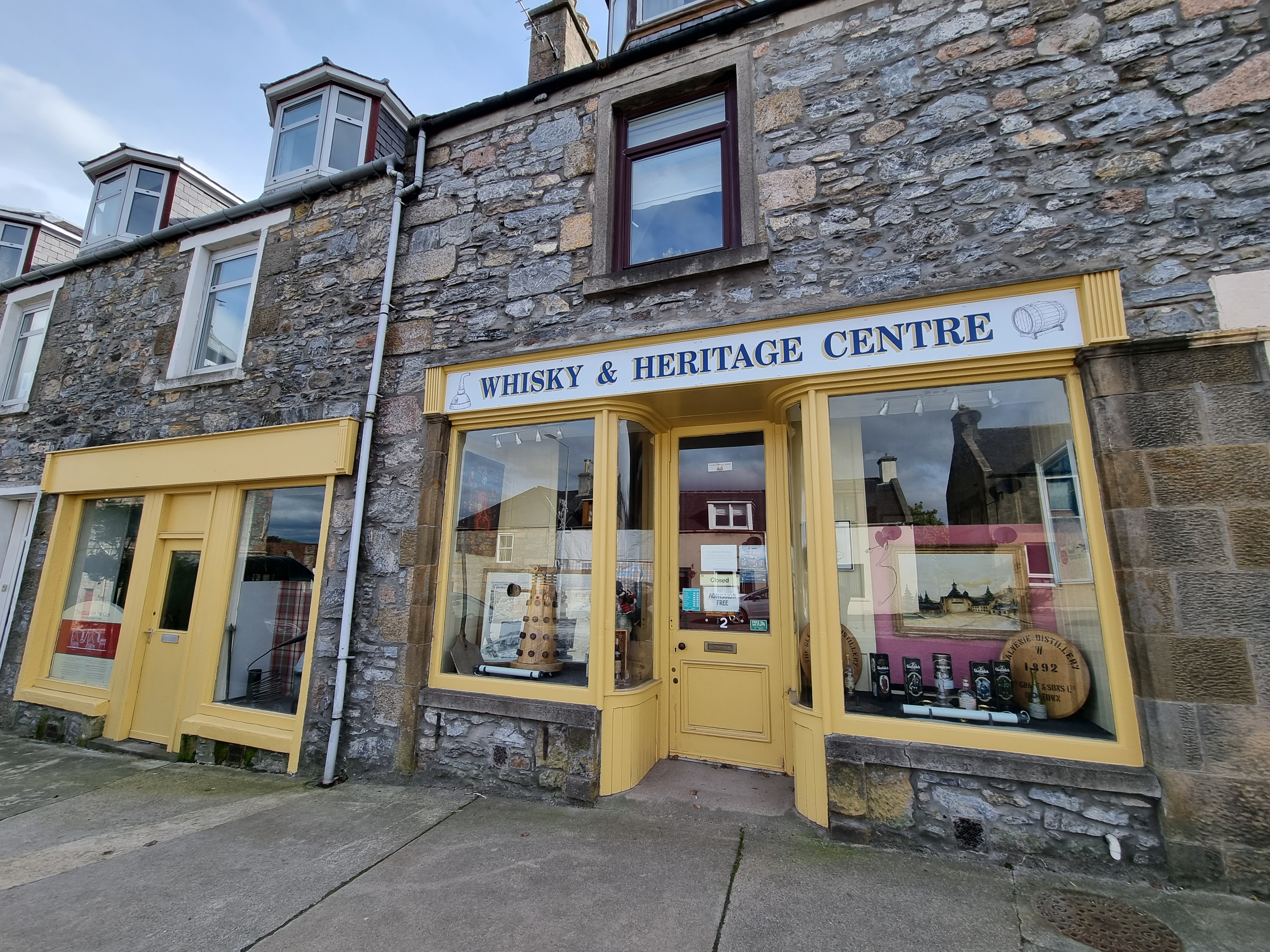
The Whisky and Heritage Centre in Dufftown, a free local history museum focusing on whisky.

The following distilleries have produced whisky in Dufftown:

=== Active distilleries ===
- Balvenie
- Dufftown
- Glendullan
- Glenfiddich
- Kininvie
- Mortlach

=== Former distilleries ===
- Convalmore
- Parkmore
- Pittyvaich

== Culture and community ==
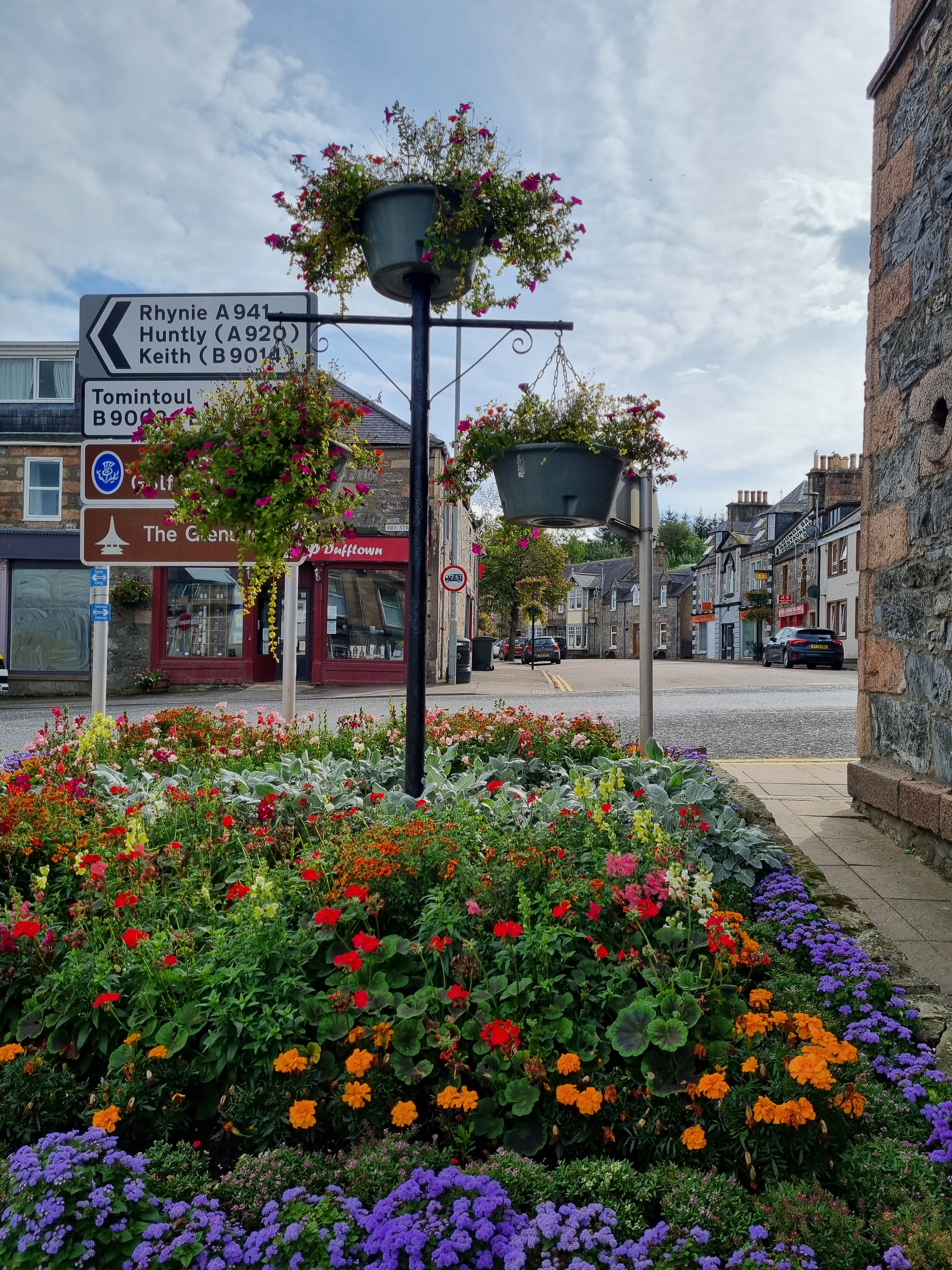
Dufftown flower display, adjacent to the clock tower in 2021.

Dufftown hosts a highland games event every July which attracts many tourists.

The town acts as the epicentre for an annual whisky festival called The Spirit of Speyside.

In April 2021, a new regeneration project for the town entitled Destination Dufftown was launched. In response to recent economic decline in the town, the project aims to encourage new visitors to the town through a plan for new facilities for the town including a leisure centre, new accommodation for visitors, camping facilities and new shops.

=== Community facilities ===
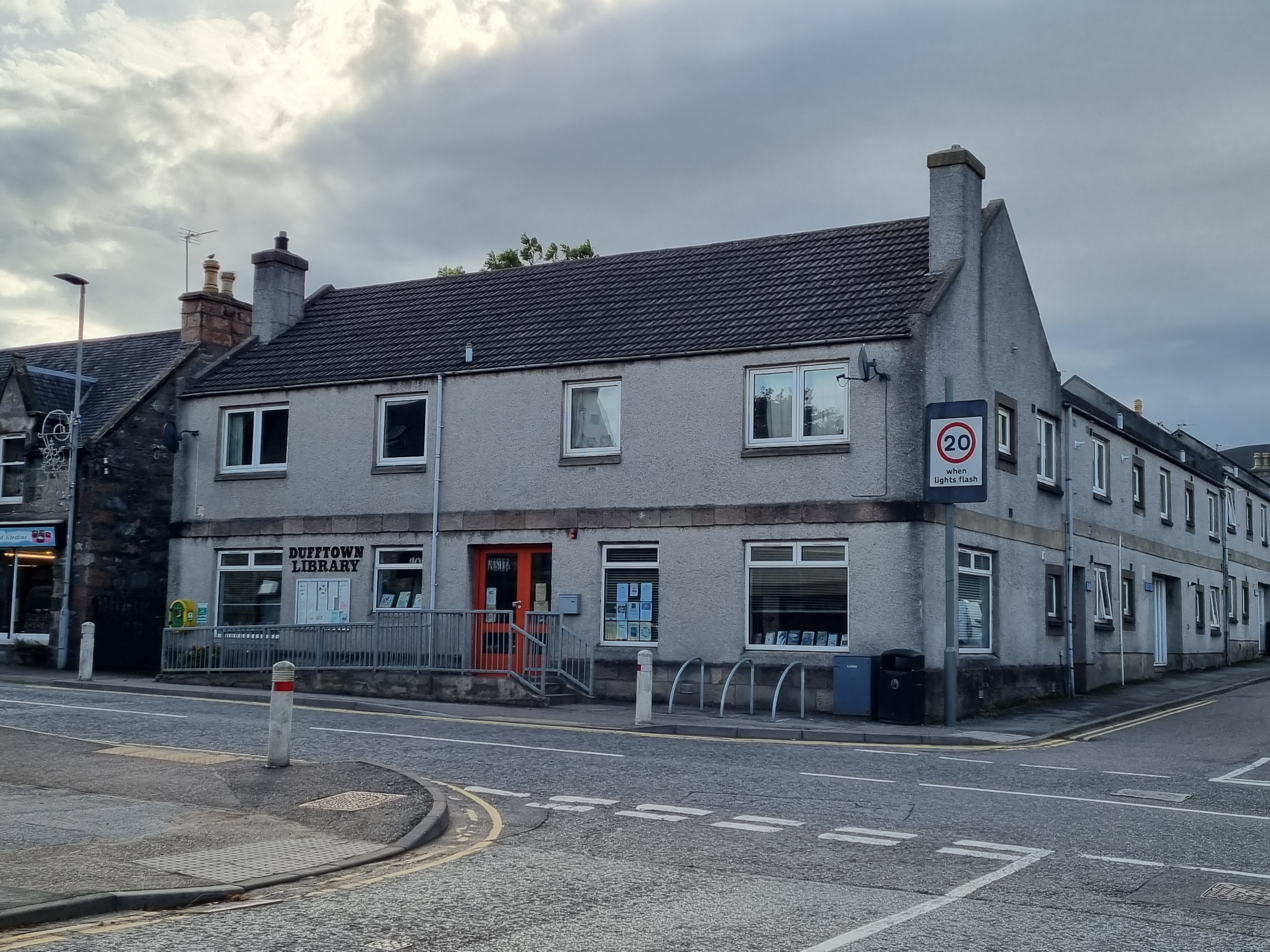
Dufftown Library on Balvenie Street in the town centre.

The Stephen Hospital is a local community hospital serving the town under the responsibility of NHS Grampian. The hospital has 20 beds, was built in 1890 and extended in 1976 and 1984, including the addition of a local health centre.

Dufftown library is a small community library on Balvenie Street in the town. The library was scheduled for closure in 2013 but the council decided to keep the library open following a legal challenge from the public.

Tininver Park is a local community park in Dufftown with a play area that was upgraded in 2021.

Dufftown Golf Club is an 18 hole course located on the south-western edge of the town.

=== Popular culture ===
According to the third film in the Harry Potter series, Harry Potter and the Prisoner of Azkaban, Hogwarts, the main setting of the series, is said to be close to Dufftown by Hermione Granger, when the town is mentioned in an article in The Daily Prophet.

== Landmarks ==
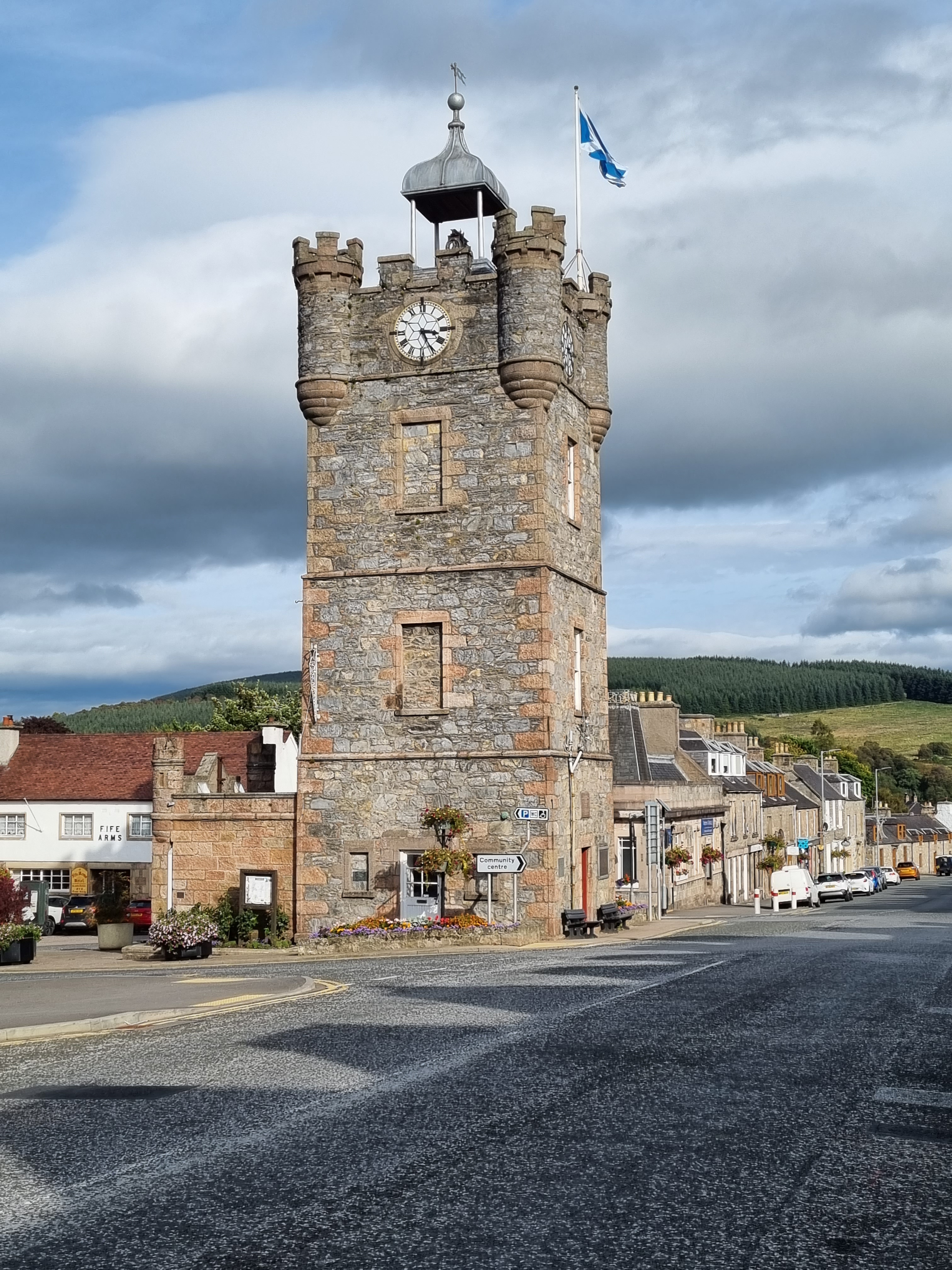
Dufftown Clock Tower, looking east along Fife Street.

Dufftown's notable buildings include Balvenie Castle, which was partly built with stones from the ruins of nearby Auchindoun Castle. The street plan of Dufftown is mainly four main roads meeting at the Dufftown Clock Tower. Built in 1839, the Clock Tower is in square form, with three floors and a crenulated roof. It was previously used as a prison but is now a tourist information centre.

The town contains many Victorian era buildings, some of which are Category B and C listed in status. As well as the Clock Tower, notable examples include the former Clydesdale Bank at Number 1 Balvenie Street (built 1880), a three bay house at 49 Fife Street (built 1830–40), the Police Station and House on York Road (built 1897), the B-listed Maravale House at 68 Fife Street (mid 19th century) and 51 Fife Street (an early 19th century house with walls and gatepiers).

The Dufftown War Memorial to persons killed in the First World War and Second World War is located on Balvenie Street. The memorial is in the form of a bronze gothic cross on a granite-ashlar pillar and there is a garden of remembrance adjacent to the memorial.

== Transport ==
The railway reached Dufftown in 1862 when the Keith and Dufftown Railway opened a station in the settlement. The station closed to passengers in 1968 with goods traffic coming to an end around 1991. In 2003, the Keith and Dufftown Railway Association reopened the station and the line as a preserved railway and set up their headquarters at the station. The nearest station with mainline services is Keith railway station.

== Education ==
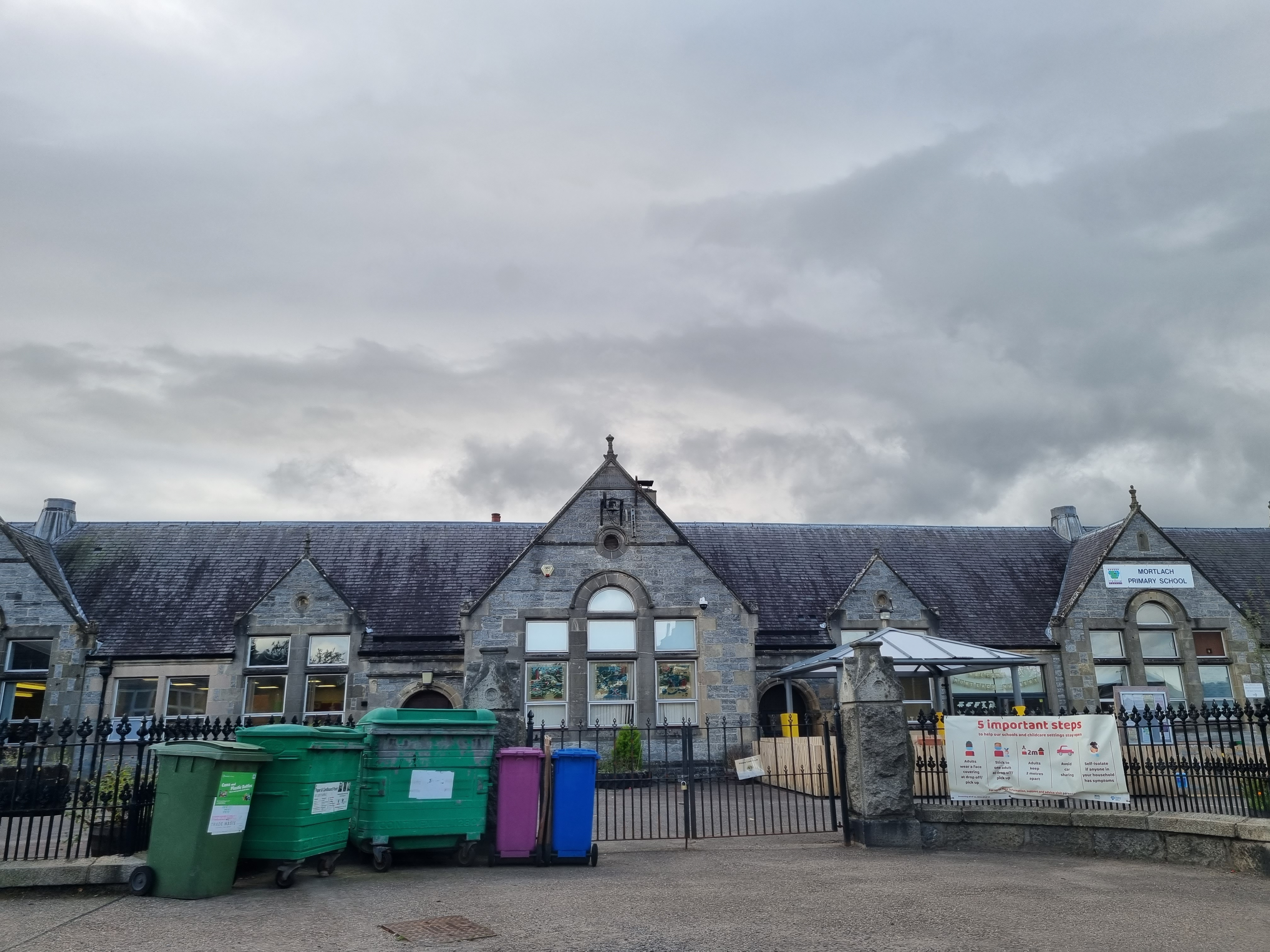
Dufftown Primary School, established in 1992.

Mortlach Primary School provides education to primary school age children in the town. The school was built in 1902 and was originally the parish school serving Mortlach.

Dufftown does not have its own secondary school, the nearest is Speyside High School in Aberlour.

== Religion ==
The old Kirkton of Mortlach, with the historic Mortlach Parish Church, is on the southern outskirts of the present town.

Today, the Diocese of Mortlach, under its Latin name of Murthlacum, is a titular see of the Catholic Church. A Catholic Church, St Mary’s, was built in the town in 1824 by the priest and musician George Gordon on Fife Street.

== Notable people ==
- Leslie Benzies (born 1971), the former president of Rockstar North, which produces the famous Grand Theft Auto game series amongst other games, was born in Aberdeen and grew up in Dufftown.
- Helen Carruthers Mackenzie (1859–1945), health campaigner, was born here in 1859.
- George Stephen, 1st Baron Mount Stephen (1829–1921), one of the founders of the Canadian Pacific Railway was born in Dufftown.
- William Grant, Lord Grant (1909–1972), Unionist Members of Parliament (MPs), Lord Advocate and Lord Justice Clerk, born in Dufftown
- William Robertson Nicoll (1851–1923), writer and Free Church Minister in Dufftown

== See also ==
- Whisky
- List of whisky brands
- List of distilleries in Scotland
