= List of listed buildings in Dufftown, Moray =

This is a list of listed buildings in the parish of Dufftown in Moray, Scotland.

== List ==
Name	Location	Date Listed	Grid Ref. (Note: Sometimes known as OSGB36, the grid reference (where provided) is based on the British national grid reference system used by the Ordnance Survey. • "Guide to National Grid". Ordnance Survey. • "Get-a-map". Ordnance Survey.)	Geo-coordinates	Notes	LB Number (Note: Historic Environment Scotland assign a unique alphanumeric identifier to each designated site in Scotland, for listed buildings this always begins with "LB", for example "LB12345".)	Image
War Memorial, Balvenie Street Dufftown				57°27′00″N 3°07′49″W	Category C(S)	24717	Upload another image
68 Fife Street, Maravale And Garden Walls				57°26′40″N 3°07′22″W	Category B	24722	Upload Photo
51 Fife Street, Clan-Y-Mor, Garden Walls And Gatepiers				57°26′38″N 3°07′30″W	Category C(S)	24724	Upload Photo
Mortlach Distillery, No 2 Kiln And No 5 Store				57°26′35″N 3°07′21″W	Category B	24725	Upload Photo
49 Fife Street				57°26′40″N 3°07′29″W	Category B	24720	Upload Photo
Fife Street, St Mary Of The Assumption Roman Catholic Church, Hall And Gatepiers				57°26′40″N 3°07′20″W	Category B	24723	Upload Photo
30 Fife Street, The Royal Oak				57°26′42″N 3°07′33″W	Category C(S)	24721	Upload another image
York Street, Police Station And Police House With Rear Walls To Hill Street				57°26′51″N 3°07′51″W	Category C(S)	24727	Upload Photo
1 Balvenie Street, Clydesdale Bank				57°26′43″N 3°07′42″W	Category B	24718	Upload Photo
9-13 (Odd Nos) Church Street, Glenfiddich Cafe And Picture House Cafe, Cinema And Projection House				57°26′40″N 3°07′42″W	Category B	24719	Upload another image
The Square, Clock Tower				57°26′41″N 3°07′42″W	Category B	24726	Upload another image

== Key ==
The scheme for classifying buildings in Scotland is:

- Category A: "buildings of national or international importance, either architectural or historic; or fine, little-altered examples of some particular period, style or building type."
- Category B: "buildings of regional or more than local importance; or major examples of some particular period, style or building type, which may have been altered."
- Category C: "buildings of local importance; lesser examples of any period, style, or building type, as originally constructed or moderately altered; and simple traditional buildings which group well with other listed buildings."

In March 2016 there were 47,288 listed buildings in Scotland. Of these, 8% were Category A, and 50% were Category B, with the remaining 42% being Category C.

== See also ==
- List of listed buildings in Moray
