= Eadweard =

Eadweard is the Anglo-Saxon form of Edward. It may refer to:

- Eadweard I (c. 874–924), known as Edward the Elder, king of the Anglo-Saxons
- Eadweard II (c. 962–978), known as Edward the Martyr, king of England
- Eadweard III (c. 1003–1066), known as Edward the Confessor, king of England
- Eadweard Muybridge (1830–1904), English photographer

== See also ==
- Eadward, 12th-century prelate in Scotland
