= Helen Mackenzie =

Helen Mackenzie may refer to:

- Helen Mackenzie (swimmer), New Zealand swimmer in 1950s-1960s
- Helen Carruthers Mackenzie (1859–1945), British educationist and public health campaigner
- Helen, wife of politician Alexander Mackenzie
