= Dufftown Clock Tower =

Class B listed clock tower in Moray, Scotland

Coordinates: 57°26′41″N 3°07′42″W

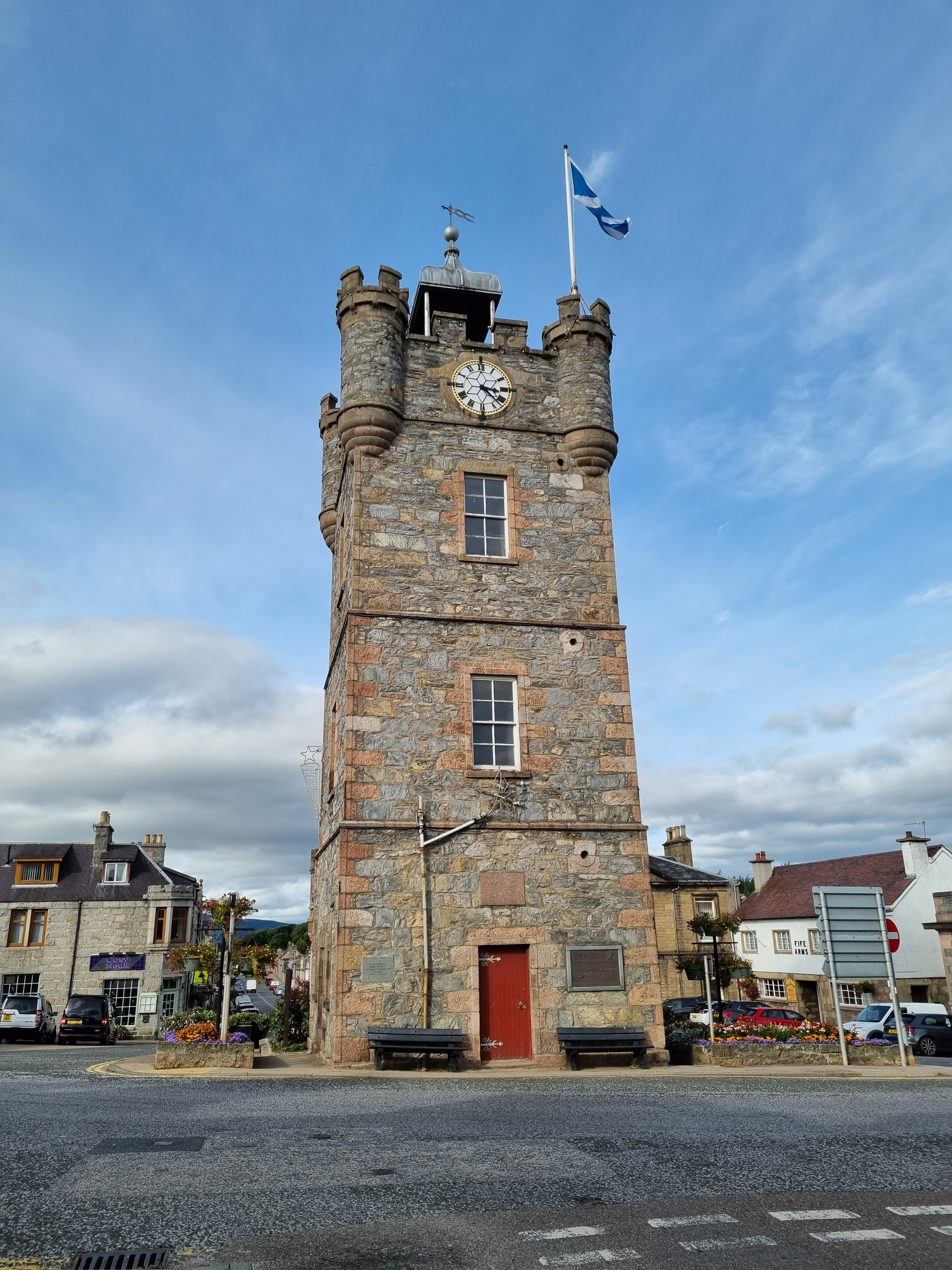
Dufftown Clock Tower in 2021

Dufftown Clock Tower is a stone tower with a clock at the crossroads in the centre of Dufftown, Moray, at the focal point of the town square. It became a Class B listed building in 1972.

The town was a planned settlement, developed from 1817 by James Duff, 4th Earl Fife, near Balvenie Castle and Balvenie House. There are six malt whisky distilleries operating nearby: Dufftown, Mortlach, Glendullan, Balvenie, Kininvie, and Glenfiddich.

The three storey tower was constructed of grey granite with pink granite dressings in 1839, as the town gaol. After use as a prison, and then as the Burgh Chambers, it is now a Tourist Information Centre.

The ground floor has doors to the south and west, with band courses between the floors. The first and second floors have a window recess on each elevation; some have a sash window but many are blank. The walls have some mock circular gun loops. The crenellated parapet has a clock face on each elevation, with a dummy bartizan at each corner. The tower was originally topped by a leaded steeple; it now has a bellcote with leaded ogee roof, ball finial and weathervane.

The clock was brought to Dufftown from Banff, where it was known as "the Clock That Hanged MacPherson": MacPherson of Kingussie was convicted and condemned to death, and the Sheriff of Banff Lord Braco put the clock forward by 15 minutes to ensure that MacPherson would be hanged before a pardon arrive.

Around the base of the tower are plaques commemorating Alexander Duff, 1st Duke of Fife (1849-1912) and Lord Mount Stephen (1829-1921), and another plaque records that the clock was illuminated to commemorate Queen Victoria's Diamond Jubilee in 1897.

A single storey pink granite extension was added to the north in 1925.

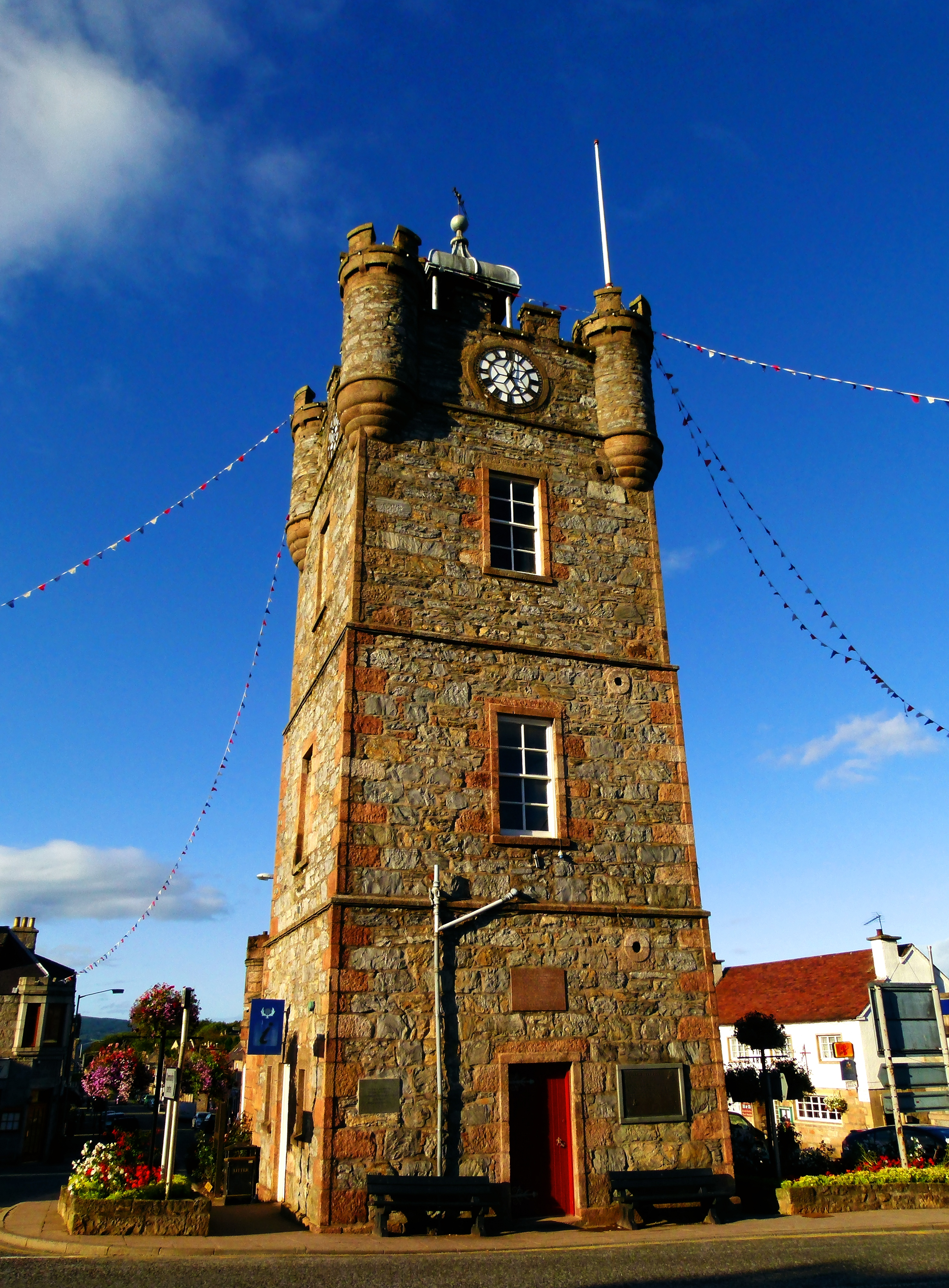
In 2011

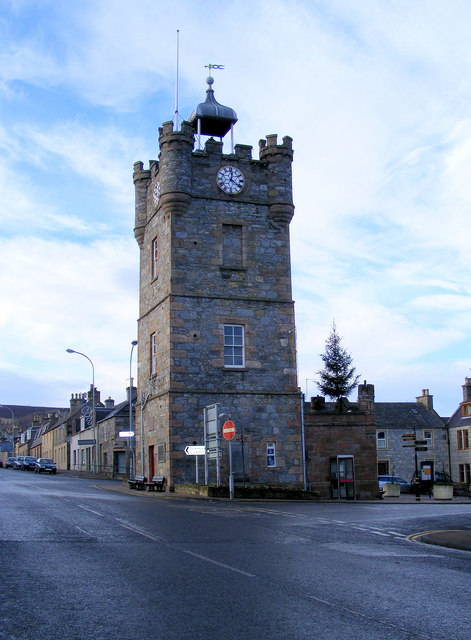
In 2009

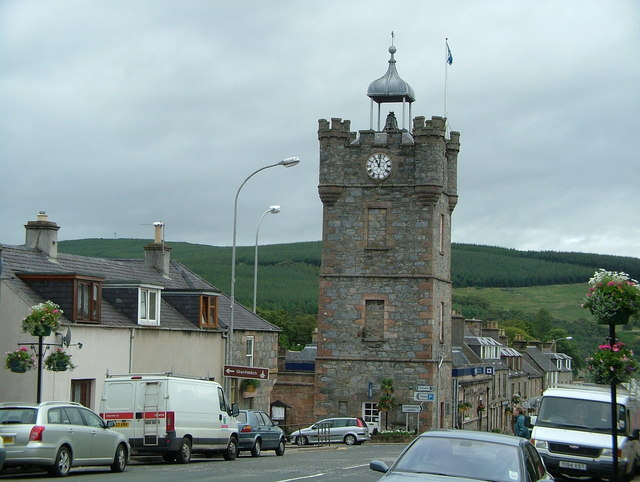
In 2007

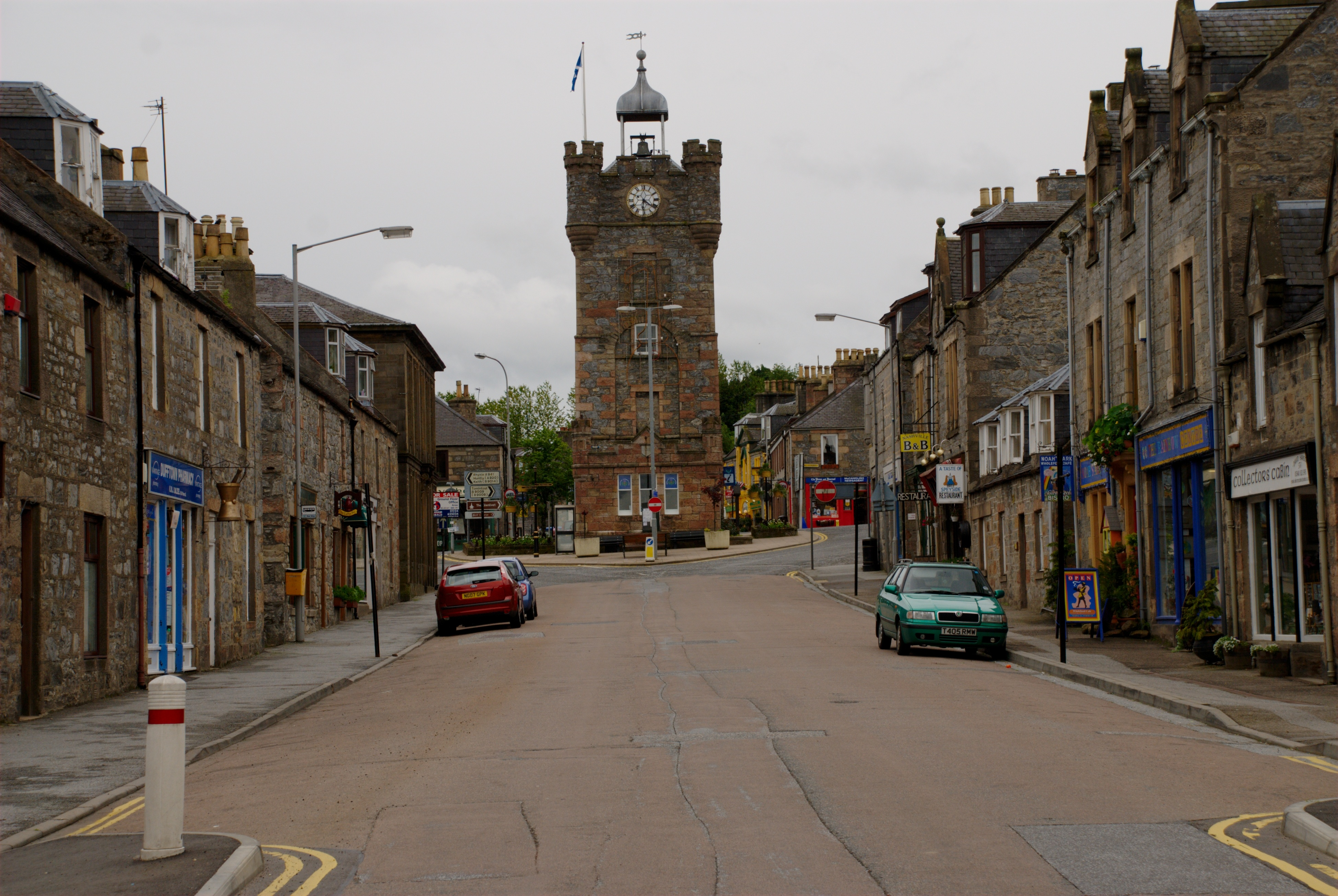
In 2007

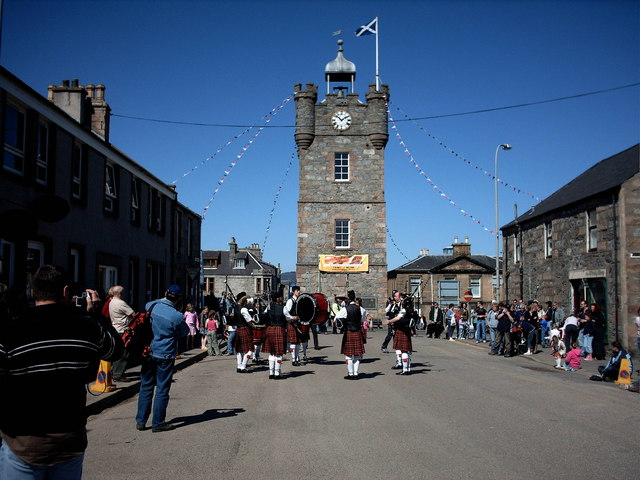
In 2006

== See also ==
- List of listed buildings in Dufftown, Moray
