= Nechtan of Aberdeen =

First Bishop of Aberdeen, Scotland

Nechtan of Aberdeen is the first Bishop of Aberdeen after the seat of the bishopric had been moved to Aberdeen from Mortlach. The only contemporary sources for Bishop Nechtan are charters; he appears as "Nectan escob Abberdeon" in a Gaelic charter recorded in the notitiae on the Book of Deer, a charter which explicitly dates to "the eighth year of the reign of David", that is, 1131. He also appears in a charter granted to him by King David I of Scotland, a charter which the modern editor dates to 1137.

Later Medieval authorities make specific claims about dates. Hector Boece, for instance, wrote that Nechtan became bishop in 1122, and that Nechtan ruled Mortlach for 14 years, and a further 17 years at Aberdeen. Moreover, Gavin Dunbar, a 16th-century Archbishop of Glasgow, wrote in his Epistolare that Nechtan's see was moved from Mortlach to Aberdeen in the year 1125, partially contradicting the account of Boece. Neither source is particularly reliable.

== Notes ==
Religious titles
| Preceded by Cormac | Bishop of Mortlach-Aberdeen fl. 1131x1137 | Succeeded by Edward |
