= Mortlach Parish Church =

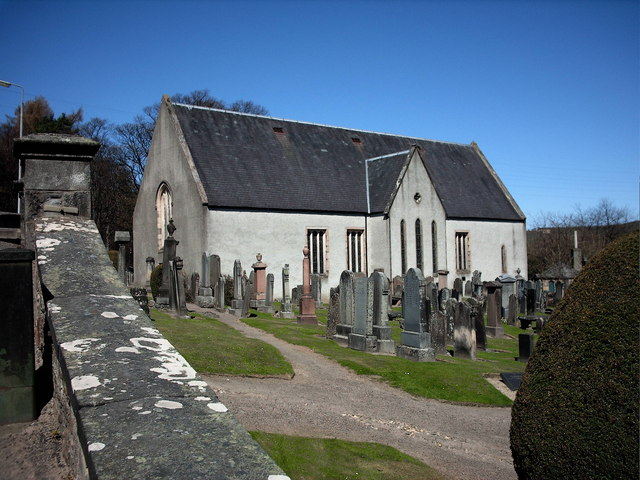
- Mortlach Parish Church, viewed from the south
- Mortlach Parish Church
- 57°26′20″N 3°07′41″W
- Location: Mortlach, near Dufftown
- Country: Scotland
- Denomination: Church of Scotland
- Previous denomination: Roman Catholic (prior to the Scottish Reformation)

Architecture
- Functional status: Active
- Heritage designation: Category A listed building

Mortlach Parish Church is a church within the Church of Scotland serving the parish of Mortlach, in Moray, close to the village of Dufftown. The site of the church has long been associated with Christianity, going back perhaps as far as 566 when St Moluag is said to have founded a religious community there. A Class II Pictish stone, dating from between the seventh and ninth centuries, was discovered there, which can now be seen in the burial ground. There was a bishopric on the site in the eleventh and twelfth centuries, prior to it being moved to Aberdeen in the reign of King David I. The current church retains some of the fabric of a thirteenth-century structure, which has been repeatedly remodelled in the centuries that followed, most recently in 1931. The church, along with the surrounding burial ground and a watch house within the grounds, has been designated a Category A listed building.

== Description ==
Mortlach Parish Church is built in a T-plan, and much of the existing structure dates to the nineteenth and twentieth centuries, but it incorporates substantial amounts of mediaeval and post-mediaeval fabric. The nave, which reflects the plan of the original thirteenth-century building, is rectangular, oriented east-west, with a nineteenth-century aisle projecting from the north side. Apart from the gable end of the north aisle which is of exposed rubble, the walls of the church are harled, with ashlar detailing.

The south elevation has a central gabled bay, protruding about a metre from the rest of the wall. This has three narrow lancet windows, with a quatrefoil window above in the gable. The east gable, which most closely resembles how the church would have looked in mediaeval times, and which, along with the monuments, was the reason for its listing, has three narrow stained-glass lancet windows, spaced widely apart, the outer two around ground level, and the central one rising up into the gable. The west gable also retains an original mediaeval window. The two main entrances are at either end of the gable of the north aisle, separated by large point-headed tripartite window, and there is a stair on the north side of the main part of the church which gives access to the galleries. An octagonal bellcote on the apex of the gable of the north aisle, made of ashlar and slightly corbelled out.

=== Interior ===
The north aisle houses a collection of sixteenth- and seventeenth-century tombstones, including that of Alexander Leslie of Kininvie, dated to around 1549, and Alexander Duff of Keithmore, and his wife Helen Grant, dated 1694. There is also a large stone finial with a sundial in one face, which is presumed to have been mounted on one of the gables at some point in the building's history.

At the east end of the nave is a raised chancel, which features a marble font, and wooden pulpit and communion table dating from the 1930s. There are wooden pews throughout the nave and the north aisle, also from the 1930s. There are galleries in the north aisle, and at the west end of the nave; the one in the nave houses a large pipe organ.

=== Watch House ===
Included within the designation is the church's watch house, which is a small polygonal building with a pointed window. This building is in a state of some disrepair, with cracks in the walls and some missing or slipped slates in the roof, and it was added to the Buildings at Risk Register for Scotland in 2008.

=== Burial Ground ===
The burial ground, which has been extended and is still in use, is also included within the designation. It is irregularly shaped and surrounded by rubble walls with spear-head railing, and contains tombstones dating from the seventeenth, eighteenth, nineteenth and twentieth centuries. Amongst these are a number of Commonwealth war graves from the first and second world wars.

Also to be found in the burial ground is pictish stone known as the Battle Stone. It is a Class II stone, featuring a Celtic cross and carvings of various animals and monsters. The stone is thought to date from some point between the seventh and ninth centuries, and is traditionally believed to commemorate a battle, but this is not certain.

== History ==
The site where Mortlach Parish Church stands has an ancient association with Christianity. Although the records from the early period of its life are not entirely reliable, it is traditionally thought to be the site of a monastery founded by St Moluag around the year 566, and King Malcolm II is thought to have extended a church already present on the site in 1010, to give thanks for winning a battle. Malcolm II is also believed to have established a bishopric at Mortlach, and scholars generally accept that at least three bishops were based there prior to 1140. The bishopric was later moved to Aberdeen during the reign of David I.

The earliest parts of the existing structure are from the thirteenth century. In the centuries that followed, the church underwent a series of extensions and remodelling, being converted first from a mediaeval to a Georgian style, then to Gothic Revival, and finally the more muted mediaeval style seen today.

The north aisle was initially added in 1826, and it was extended in 1876 by Alexander Marshall Mackenzie. The projection on the south wall, which originally housed the organ and pulpit, also dates from this time. Work done at this time re-exposed the lancet windows in the east gable, which had been hidden during earlier renovation works; the church's mediaeval features were further restored during another period of restoration, in 1930–1931, undertaken by A. Marshall Mackenzie & Son. The nave was largely remodelled at this time, with the organ moved to the gallery to the west of the nave, and the pulpit and communion table moved to the raised chancel at the east end.

Mortlach Parish Church, with its watch house and burial grounds, was designated a Category B listed building in 1972; it was upgraded to Category A in 1987.

== Current Usage ==
Mortlach Parish Church is still in use as an active place of worship, and a part of the Church of Scotland. It is presided over by Rev Eduard Enslin.
