= River Fiddich =

Tributary of the River Spey in northeast Scotland

Coordinates: 57°26′N 3°07′W

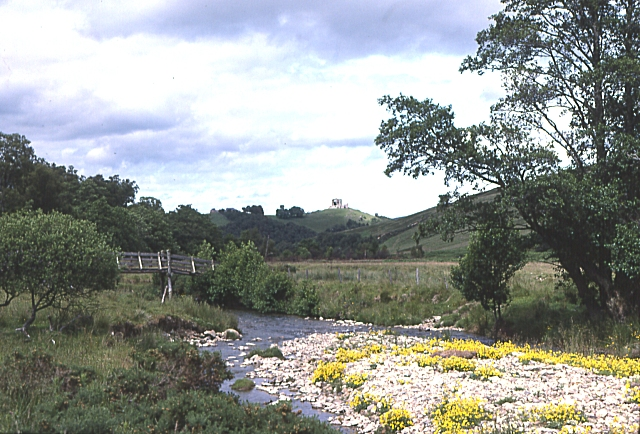
River Fiddich near Bridgehaugh in 1983

The River Fiddich (Scottish Gaelic: Fiodhach / Abhainn Fhiodhaich) is a right bank tributary of the River Spey in northeast Scotland. It rises on the eastern slopes of Corriehabbie Hill in Glenfiddich Forest and flows northeastwards beneath the A941 road, past Auchindoun Castle to a sharp bend adjacent to the A920 road where it turns westwards to flow to Dufftown. The Fiddich is joined on the eastern edge of the town by the Dullan Water which drains Glen Rinnes. Their combined waters then flow generally northwestwards, passing beneath the B9014 road near Balvenie Castle and then the A95 at Craigellachie immediately before meeting the Spey.

The headwaters of the Dullan Water, the Burn of Favat and the Corryhabbie Burn, meet at Milltown of Laggan before flowing as the Dullan, northeastwards to Dufftown. There are distilleries adjacent to both rivers, notably that producing Glenfiddich whisky.

== Etymology ==
The name derives from that of an ancient province of Pictland by the name of Fidach. Fida may have been a pre-Gaelic personal name.
