= Cormac of Mortlach =

Third Bishop of Mortlach, Scotland

Cormac of Mortlach is the third Bishop of Mortlach, Scotland, according to the list of the Aberdeen Registrum. He is known only by name. Skene tried to identify him with Bishop Cormac of Dunkeld, but this argument rests purely on the similarity of an extremely common name. Cormac's successor Nechtan was bishop by at least 1131, when he appears in a charter recorded in the Gaelic notitiae on the margins of the Book of Deer.

== Notes ==
Religious titles
Preceded by Donercius	Bishop of Mortlach fl. 1000sx1131	Succeeded by Nechtan
