= Helen Carruthers Mackenzie =

Scottish suffragist, social work educator and public health campaigner

Helen Carruthers Mackenzie CBE
- Born: Helen Carruthers Spence; 13 April 1859; Mortlach, Banffshire, Scotland
- Died: 25 September 1945 (aged 86); Edinburgh, Scotland
- Other names: Dame Helen Carruthers Mackenzie; Helen, Lady Leslie Mackenzie
- Citizenship: British
- Known for: Education, public health and women's campaigns and issues
- Spouse: Sir William Leslie Mackenzie

Helen, Lady Leslie Mackenzie (née Helen Carruthers Spence) CBE (13 April 1859 – 25 September 1945) was a Scottish suffragist, pioneering social work educator and public health campaigner.

== Early life ==
Mackenzie was born Helen Carruthers Spence in Mortlach, Banffshire, the daughter of William Spence, merchant tailor and provost of Dufftown, and his wife, Mary McDonell. She was educated at the local village school, where she became a pupil teacher. She trained to be a teacher at the Church of Scotland Training College in Aberdeen and then she taught around Aberdeen until she married Dr (later Sir) William Leslie Mackenzie in 1892.

== Social and political work ==
Shortly after their marriage, the couple moved to Edinburgh, where Dr Mackenzie was Chief Medical Officer for Leith. Helen Mackenzie became involved in the social and political life of the city, acting as the Honorary Secretary of the Edinburgh and District branch of the Women's Emancipation Union in 1895, working with middle and working class women to resist authority until the right to vote was won (e.g., asking those standing for election to support women's suffrage before selection to stand). Mackenzie had become part of the suffrage movement as early as 1891, under the influence of Elizabeth Clarke Wolstenholme Elmy in WEU in Newton Stewart, Galloway. She moved to Edinburgh and was invited to join the Edinburgh National Society for Women's Suffrage, which, she said, ‘included the prominent women of Edinburgh of that time’. Mackenzie went on to be one of the founders of the Edinburgh Women Citizens' Association in 1918, alongside Mona Chalmers Watson, and was described as the 'most active executive committee members' and over these years she worked for women's emancipation alongside Elsie Inglis, Flora Stevenson, Louisa Stevenson, Mary Burton, and Jessie Methven.

Throughout her life, she showed a strong commitments to education, public health as well as women's campaigns and issues. In 1901, Dr Mackenzie was appointed the Scottish Local Government Board’s first medical inspector. Mackenzie and her husband collaborated on a 1903 Royal Commission for Scotland report on the health of school children in Edinburgh. Helen Mackenzie organised the studies and wrote the reports, and was present while her doctor husband examined the children. The report demonstrated conclusively that there was inverse relationship between affluence and children's health. McKenzie and her husband argued that teachers should be trained in health issues and many of their recommendations were adopted into the 1908 Education (Scotland) Act.

After her husband’s knighthood, known as Lady Leslie Mackenzie, she became one of the founding committee members on the University of Edinburgh's School of Social Study and Training, where she taught a course on Local Government from 1918 until at least 1932. In addition, she had a long involvement with the Edinburgh College of Domestic Science (which later was absorbed into the Queen Margaret University), chairing it from 1943 - 1945. She served as President of the National Association of Health Visitors, Women Sanitary Inspectors and School Nurses as well as being a Member of the Departmental Committee for the review of public health services in Scotland. She continued to be active in social and political work up until her death in Edinburgh in 1945.

== Honours ==
Her husband was knighted in 1919, making her Lady Leslie Mackenzie. Mackenzie was honoured in her own right when she was made a Commander of the Order of the British Empire (CBE) in 1933, for her work with women and children.

In 1937, the University of Edinburgh awarded her an honorary doctor of letters degree.
