= Donercius =

Donercius or Donort is the second Bishop of Mortlach according to the list of the Aberdeen Registrum. He is known only by name. Skene says that "Donercius has all the appearance of a fictitious name". Whether the name is fictitious or a corruption cannot be known from the existing evidence. His alleged predecessor Beóán is known to have been bishop in the reign of King Máel Coluim II of Scotland, so if Donercius really did exist, he was certainly bishop in the 11th century.

== Notes ==
Religious titles
Preceded by Beóán	Bishop of Mortlach fl. 1000s	Succeeded by Cormac
