= Edward of Aberdeen =

12th-century bishop of Aberdeen

Edward [Ēadweard, Eadward, Édouard, Étbard] was a 12th-century prelate based in Scotland. He occurs in the records for the first time as Bishop of Aberdeen in a document datable to some point between 1147 and 1151. His immediate predecessor, as far as the records are concerned, was Bishop Nechtán. The latter can be shown to have been active at least between 1131 and 1132, and possibly as late as 1137. Edward's accession must have occurred, then, sometime between 1131 and 1151, with a date after the 1130s more likely than not.

Edward witnessed charters of Kings David I, Máel Coluim IV and William the Lion. Bishop Edward was the recipient of a Bull, dated 10 August 1157, of Pope Adrian IV, confirming the possessions of the diocese of Aberdeen and authorising the bishop to appoint at his own discretion either monastic or secular canons to staff his cathedral. This to some extent marks Bishop Edward as a founding father figure for the bishopric, though he was not the first bishop. His name, Edward, may indicate an Anglo-Norman or even an Anglo-Saxon origin, though this cannot be taken with certainty, as the name was associated with the saintly and famous Normanised English King Edward the Confessor, and had been the name of a son of King Máel Coluim III mac Donnchada. Nevertheless, if the former is the case, he is the first non-native Scot to ascend the bishopric of Aberdeen.

It is possible, if not likely, that Edward was the Chancellor of that name who served King David I in the 1140s. Edward's death, recorded in the Chronicle of Melrose, occurred in 1171. He was succeeded by Matthew.

Religious titles
Preceded by Nechtán	Bishop of Aberdeen; 1131 x 1151–1171	Succeeded by Matthew
Government offices
Preceded by Herbert of Selkirk	Chancellor of Scotland c.1143–c.1145	Succeeded by William Comyn
