= Beóán of Mortlach =

Scottish bishop

Beóán of Mortlach is the first of the three known Bishops of Mortlach. His name, which could also be written in non-Gaelic contexts as Beanus, Beoanus and Beyn, means "lively one". Walter Bower, following John of Fordun, says that the bishopric was founded by king Máel Coluim II of Scotland in the seventh year of his reign (1012 AD) as thanks to God for victories over the Scandinavians, and says that "the first bishop was Beyn, a saintly man, worthy of the episcopal office, elevated to this see by the Lord Pope Benedict VIII at the king's request". The Aberdeen Registrum records a charter granted to Bishop Beóán by King Máel Coluim at Forfar, granting the bishop the churches and lands of Clova and the unidentified Dulmech. The Aberdeen Breviary commemorated "Bishop Beóán" (Beyn episcopus) as a saint on 26 October. Another Beóán, perhaps the one mentioned in the Life of St. Cathróe of Metz, was commemorated on 16 December, and the two were often confused.

== Notes ==
Religious titles
Preceded by New Creation	Bishop of Mortlach bp. 1012-?	Succeeded by Donercius
