= George H. Taggart =

American genre painter and portraitist

George Henry Taggart
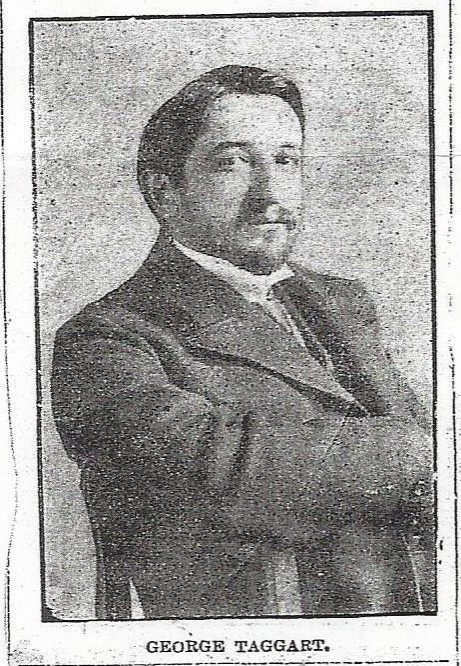
- Born: March 11, 1865; Evans Mills, New York, U.S.
- Died: August 26, 1958 (aged 93); Port Washington, New York, U.S.
- Resting place: Brookside Cemetery, Watertown, New York
- Education: Académie Julian
- Occupation: Painter
- Spouse: Mary Dickson Sample

George H. Taggart (March 11, 1865 – August 26, 1958) was an American genre painter and portraitist.

== Life ==
Taggart was born on March 11, 1865, in Evans Mills, New York. He attended the Académie Julian in Paris, France, where he was trained by William-Adolphe Bouguereau, Gabriel Ferrier, and Jules Joseph Lefebvre. He first exhibited his work in France at the Paris Salon and in Toulouse.

Taggart returned to New York, where he exhibited his work at the National Academy of Design in 1898. He moved to Salt Lake City, Utah in 1900, and he was asked to do paintings for Brigham Young University and the Salt Lake Temple of the Church of Jesus Christ of Latter-day Saints. For example, he did a portrait of Joseph Smith in 1902, and a group portrait of the Quorum of the Twelve in 1903. He painted many portraits of prominent Utahns, including Salt Lake City Mayor Ezra Thompson. He traveled to Mexico to do a portrait of President Porfirio Díaz in 1903. His artwork was collected by Guillermo Landa y Escandón and Wilhelm II, German Emperor.

Taggart married Mary Dickson Sample. He died August 26, 1958, in Port Washington, New York, and he was buried in the Brookside Cemetery in Watertown, New York.
