= Lickleyhead Castle =

Castle in Aberdeenshire, Scotland

- Aberdeenshire in Scotland
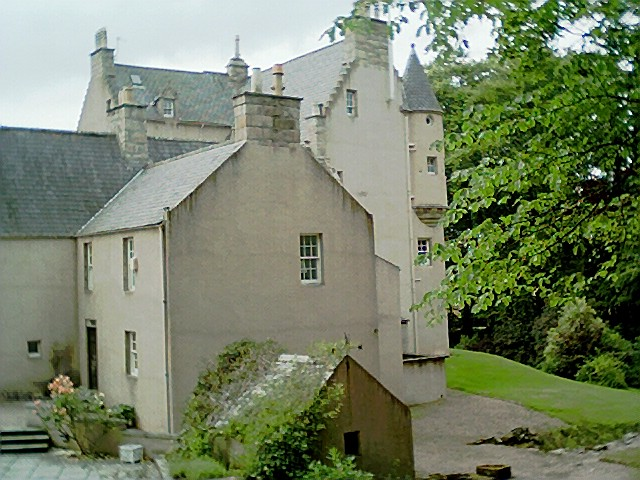
- Lickleyhead Castle

Site information
- Type: L-plan castle
- Condition: Restored

Location
- Location in Aberdeenshire
- Coordinates: 57.3020°N 2.6203°W

Site history
- Built: c. 1600

Garrison information
- Designations: Category A listed building

Lickleyhead Castle is a well-restored L-plan castle, dating from around 1600, a kilometre south of Auchleven, by the banks of the Gadie Burn, in Aberdeenshire, Scotland. Alternative spellings are Licklihead and Licklyhead Castle.

== History ==
The estate originally belonged to Clan Leslie, but William Leith, who had twice been Provost of Aberdeen, acquired it from George Leslie in the 13th century. It remained in that family until, in 1625, Patrick Leith sold it to William Forbes of Leslie, who is thought to have restored the main element of the building, perhaps with the help of John Bell of Aberdeen.

While residing in the house, William Forbes, illegitimate son of John Forbes, accidentally shot off his hand. This was believed to be a judgment on him for the murder of Alexander Irvine, who was thought to be a supporter of the Marquess of Montrose. After the Restoration, he was executed for the crime.

The house was owned by the Hays for a period from the end of the 17th century.

Patrick Duff of Craigston purchased the castle in 1723. He and his son built a new wing to the castle and remodelled its interior. There were further additions during the 1820s by Henry Lumsden, after he acquired the property from the Ogilvy-Maitland family.

The castle was the seat of the lairds of Premney.

Don Guillermo de Landa y Escandón, then Governor of Mexico City, bought the castle in 1922 for his daughter Maria Luiz following her marriage into the Arbuthnot-Leslie family. Her great-granddaughter Rose Leslie, an actress, lived at Lickleyhead Castle during her childhood. The castle was repossessed from her father in 2018 after a dispute about repayments for a loan. The current owners are the Davies family, originally from the Wirral.

== Structure ==
The main block of the castle lies east to west, with the wing providing cover over two faces by jutting out southward. In the main block, there are corbelled two-storey turrets on the north front, the upper floors having oval windows. A heavily corbelled semi-circular stair turret, corbelled out to square, rises in the west re-entrant; it provides access to a watch room in the wing. The castle has crow-stepped gables. It is harled, and has a slated roof.

The tower rises to three storeys, with an attic and a garret. While it has no gun loops, it has twelve shot holes. There are decorated pediments.

There is a vaulted basement, with a kitchen and cellar, lit by slit windows; this is accessed by the entrance in the main re-entrant angle to the south. Narrowing turnpike stairs give access to the first floor; ascent afterwards is by the turret stair. There is an excellent hall.

It is a category A listed building.
