= Nicholas Bogdan =

Archaeologist and architectural historian

Nicholas Quentin Bogdan BA MPhil (18 June 1947 – 16 August 2002) was an archaeologist and architectural historian who was a pioneer in urban rescue archaeology and a specialist in the study of Scottish castles. He was notable for his direction of rescue excavations in the centre of Perth and his work on Fetternear Palace in Aberdeenshire.

== Early life and education ==
Nicholas Bogdan was born in 1947. He was the son of a Russian doctor, Andrew Bogdanovich who afterwards changed the family name to Bogdan due to anti-Russian sentiment. He was educated at Gordonstoun school and then read archaeology at Queen's University, Belfast. He did post-graduate work at the University of St Andrews on Scottish castles.

== Archaeological work ==
He helped form the Scottish Castles Survey project. He was a founding member of the Tayside and Fife Archaeological Committee in 1976 and was a member of the committee until 1984.

In 1975 he was appointed director of a large urban excavation in the centre of Perth, using funding from the Manpower Services Commission. The site was finally published thirty-five years later.

== Fetternear Palace ==
Nicholas Bogdan was a co-director of the Scottish Episcopal Palaces Project with Penelope (Penny) Dransart of the University of Wales, Lampeter. The major work of this project was on Fetternear Bishop’s Palace in Aberdeenshire. This was once the residence of Bishop Alexander Kinimund, author of the Declaration of Arbroath in 1320. In 1560, Fetternear became the principal Scottish seat of the Leslies of Balquhain and Fetternear. Survey and excavation work here began in 1995 and recovered a vast amount of material. It also “demonstrated that Fetternear is one of the most important medieval sites in the British Isles”. Research uncovered links via the Leslie family to Austria, Hungary and Slovenia. Only after working at Fetternear did Bogdan find out that he was distantly related to the Leslies of Balquhain and Fetternear.

== Personal life ==
He was involved in the restoration of Barra Castle in Aberdeenshire, his home throughout his life. He never married but was survived by his partner Penny Dransart.
