= Leslie Castle =

Castle in Aberdeenshire, Scotland

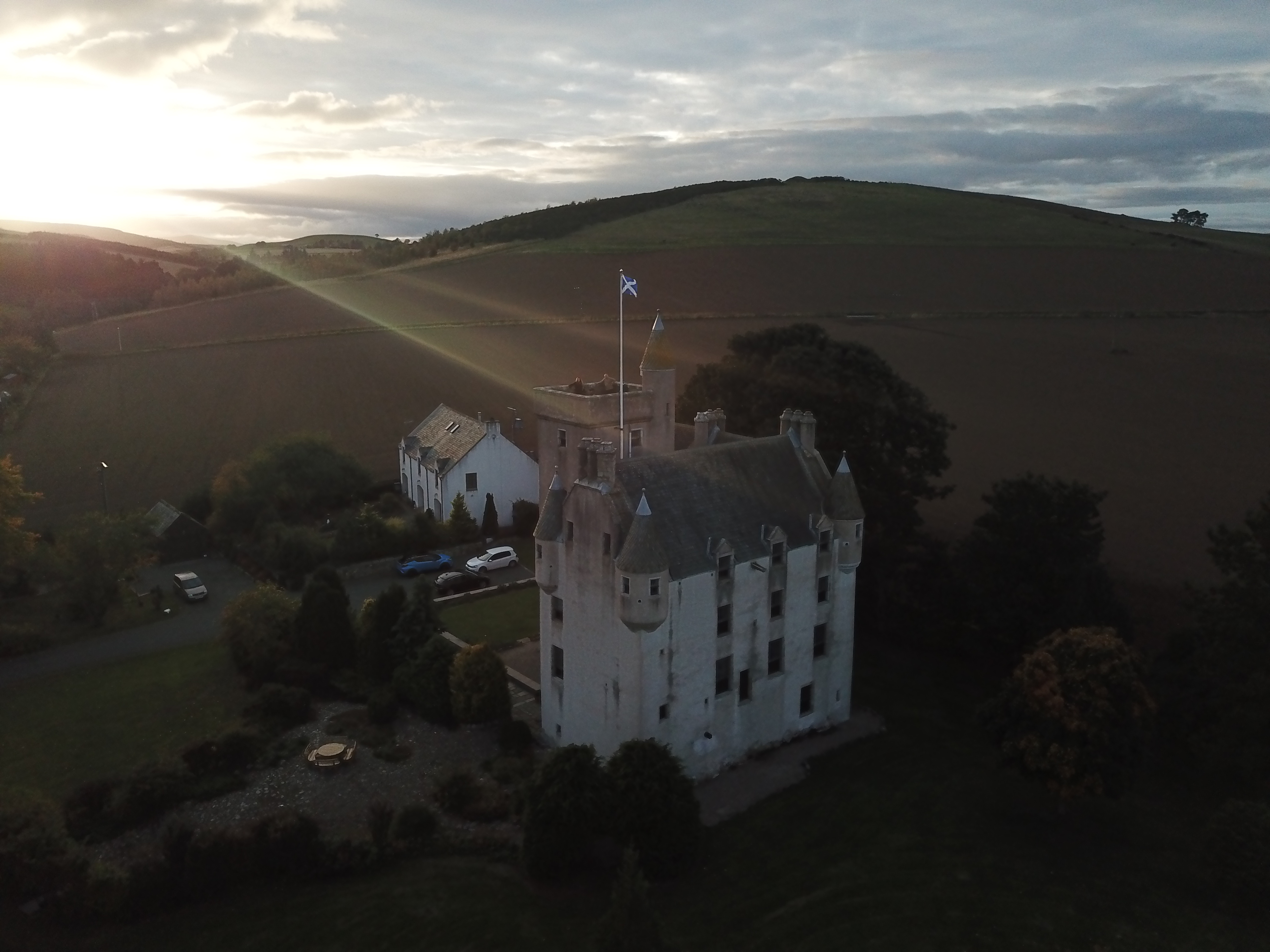
- Leslie Castle in 2018

- Location within Aberdeenshire
- 57.3125°N 2.666389°W
- Type: Castle
- Location: Leslie, Aberdeenshire

History
- Built: Around 1661
- Built for: William Forbes of Monymusk

Site notes
- Restored: 1989
- Current use: Operates as a Guesthouse

Listed Building – Category B
- Official name: LESLIE CASTLE
- Designated: 24 November 1972
- Reference no.: LB9239

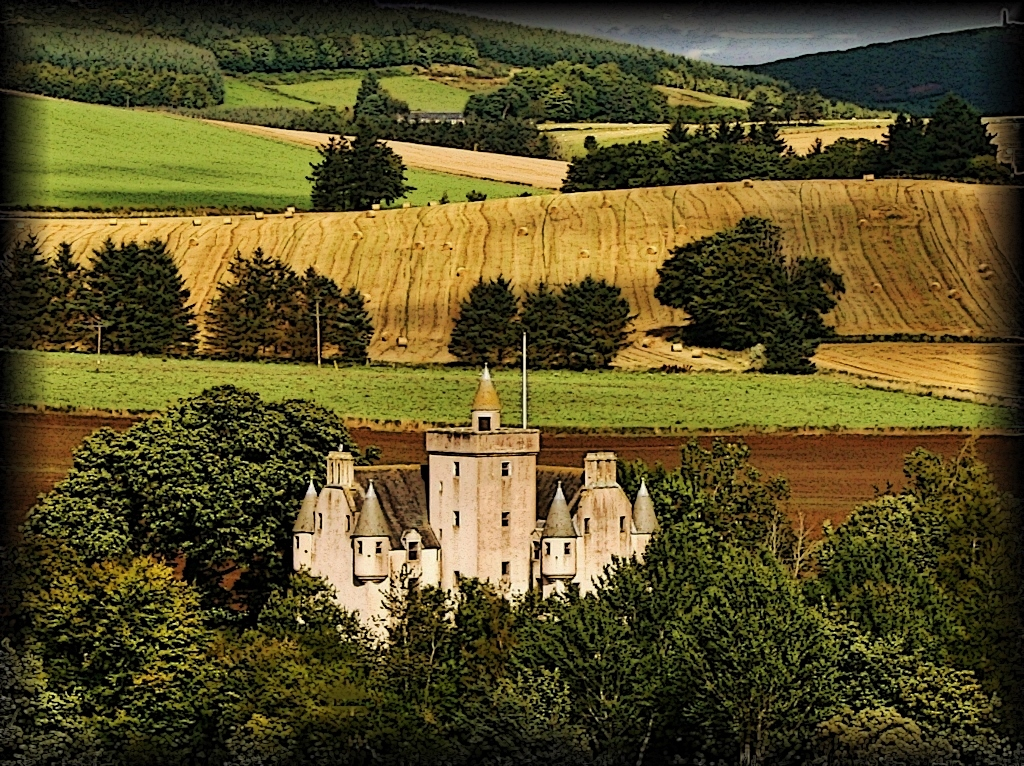
Leslie Castle

Leslie Castle is a castle in Aberdeenshire, Scotland, the historical seat of Clan Leslie, located just to the west of Auchleven, or about 45 kilometres (28 mi) northwest of Aberdeen.

== History ==
It was an L-plan castle and featured a unique staircase in the square tower which made use of lamps in a central column with openings into the stairwell itself for illumination. The lamps could be raised and lowered by a chain. The castle was three storeys high with a garret. The basement was vaulted, and it also had a drawbridge with gatehouse.

It was built for William Forbes of Monymusk on the site of a former castle (probably a wooden motte and bailey) around 1661 as "the last fortified house in Scotland". There is an inscription on the wall dated 17 June 1661.

Following the death of Forbes in 1670, it fell into the possession of Leiths of Leith Hall.

By 1820, the last resident of the castle, Captain Stewart, had died and the castle itself had lost its roof and became a ruin.

== 20th and 21st century ==
It became a category B listed building on 24 November 1972, when it was recorded ruinous, the interior filled with debris, and the floors gone.

In 1980, the castle and estate were purchased for about $25,000 and restored by the City of Aberdeen architect David Carnegie Leslie at a cost of about $1 million. The castle's walls had collapsed and there were piles of rubble up to 8 feet (2.4 m) high, and tons of carved stone had been stolen over the years. A full-sized tree had also grown inside a collapsed parapet. The castle was restored using stone from 300-year-old cottages on a neighbouring estate that had also collapsed. In July 1989, it was opened as a hotel with five bedrooms. It was descheduled in September 1989.

In 1995, a Leslie Clan Gathering was held at Leslie Castle.

In 2016, the castle opened again as Leslie Castle B&B and was listed for sale in 2017 when it was described by The Scotsman as a "fairytale castle" with 1.9 acres of land. The original kitchen was being used as a breakfast room with a large fire place, the second and third floor were the guest bedrooms, whilst the owner's rooms were on the fourth floor.

Since 2018, the castle has been operating as a guesthouse run by the current Baron of Leslie (John Andrea), but is also available for exclusive hire for events.
