= Fetternear Palace =

Coordinates: 57.2437°N 2.4599°W

Fetternear Bishop's Palace
- Interactive map of the Fetternear Bishop's Palace area

General information
- Location: near Kemnay in Aberdeenshire

Fetternear Bishop's Palace is an archaeological site of what was one of the palaces (or residences) of the medieval bishops of Aberdeen. It is near Kemnay in Aberdeenshire. Later, a ruined tower-house and mansion of Fetternear House were built on part of the site.

== Fetternear parish and the location of the bishop’s palace ==
The bishop's palace at Fetternear was situated in what was, in medieval times, a separate parish. At the end of the sixteenth century the parish was incorporated, along with Logie Durno, into that of Chapel of Garioch. Fetternear's parish kirk was dedicated to St Ninian and was on the north bank of the River Don about a mile from the bishop's palace.

The palace itself is on sloping ground above the Marshes Burn near its confluence with the River Don opposite Kemnay. Placename scholars consider the Fetter- element of the name to be derived from the Gaelic term fetter (or fother, fodder, fether). Toponyms of this type typically refer to the situation of the place on shelving or terraced land. Scholars do not agree on the meaning of the –near element of the placename.

== In documentary sources ==
The lands of Fetternear belonged to the church from at least the twelfth century. There are few documentary references to the bishop's palace, although the name of Fetternear (in various spellings) does occur in medieval charters. In 1157 Pope Adrian IV confirmed that the manor and lands belonged to Edward, Bishop of Aberdeen. Alexander II of Scotland designated in 1242 the lands of Fetternear and Brass (now Forest of Birse) as free forests or, in other words, hunting reserves. He granted them to Ralph, Bishop of Aberdeen.

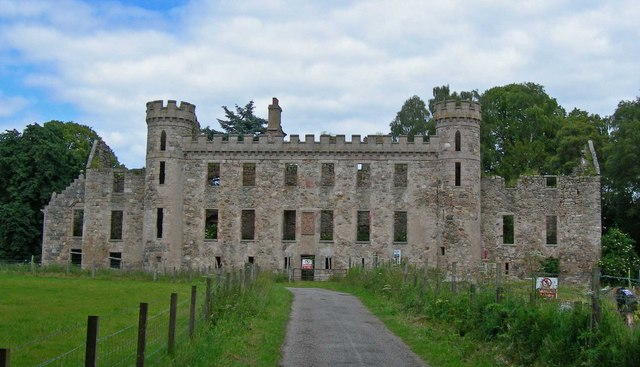
Fetternear House (the palace is no longer standing)

A tradition reported in 1522 by Hector Boece, the first principal of the University of Aberdeen, concerned Bishop Alexander de Kininmund I, who is reported to have spent Easter at Old Aberdeen, summer at Fetternear, autumn at Old Rayne and Christmas at Mortlach. According to Boece, Bishop Alexander undertook these pastoral visitations "to educate his flock and correct their errors" and, in order to fulfil these duties, he began to construct residences in each of the four named places. Boece said that Bishop Alexander completed the palaces at Aberdeen and Fetternear despite the distractions caused by the First War of Scottish Independence against England. Given that the earlier charters mention the existence of a manor at Fetternear, Bishop Alexander must have been responsible for rebuilding the palace.

== Scottish Episcopal Palaces Project – Fetternear ==
In an architectural history of the post-medieval mansion at Fetternear, H. Gordon Slade mentioned that very little of the bishop's palace remained visible above ground. He speculated that the "foundations or lower walls" were perhaps of a tower built in an L-shaped plan. Slade's article concentrates mainly on the post-Reformation architectural history of Fetternear House and its associations with the Leslies of Balquhain, the family who obtained the estate after the Protestant Reformation in 1560.

Given that very little scholarly attention had been given to the medieval bishop's palace of Fetternear, the late Nicholas Bogdan, of the Scottish Castles Survey, and Penelope (Penny) Dransart, of the University of Wales, Lampeter, founded the Scottish Episcopal Palaces Project (SEPP) in 1995. The aim of the project is to investigate the architectural development of Scottish bishops’ palaces as residences that were designed to facilitate pastoral visitations throughout the diocese. To date the project has concentrated on the site of Fetternear in the medieval diocese of Aberdeen and on Kinneddar in the diocese of Moray.

The excavations at Fetternear done by SEPP have established that the visible remains of the foundations observed by Slade were heavily remodelled in the late nineteenth century, by one of the Leslie lairds of Balquhain and Fetternear. This remodelling was done after an excavation of those parts of the bishop's palace that lay under the lawns in front of the mansion. William Kelly, the Aberdeen architect, reported having seen moulded stonework from the excavation in the first decade of the twentieth century, commenting on its fine quality.

The work of SEPP has demonstrated that the medieval bishop's palace was largely surrounded by a moat. In all probability the earliest palace was constructed from timber on the platform enclosed by the moat, from which the water flowed through a ditch leading to the Marshes Burn. The 2006 excavation uncovered evidence for an oak palisade on the inside of the moat, surrounding the buildings of the palace. The entrance to the palace from the southeast would have been over a timber trestle bridge, the sole plate of which was excavated in 2009. During the 2005 and 2006 excavation seasons, the excavation team also explored the kitchen, in the south-west corner of the palace.

In 2010, surviving sections of the south and east wall of a masonry-built chapel were identified a short distance south of the tower-house. As a visitor entered over the timber bridge into the medieval palace, he or she would have had to have turned right to gain entry to the chapel.

2010 was the sixteenth and final excavation season in SEPP's work at Fetternear. Since then, the project has entered the post-excavation phase, and is conducting research into the documentary sources relating to the history of the site and a detailed study of the finds. Feld walking surveys have also been carried out in the surrounding area.

From 30 March to 27 October 2013 an exhibition entitled 'Light Divine: Church and Chapel Windows at Fetternear, Aberdeenshire' was held at Blairs Museum - The Museum of Scotland's Catholic Heritage, Aberdeen. This exhibition focused on the buildings associated with Christian worship in the palace and elsewhere on the Fetternear estate. It explored the qualities and characteristics of the window glass used in these structures as well as displaying other glass finds from the excavation.
