= Clan Urquhart =

Highland Scottish family group

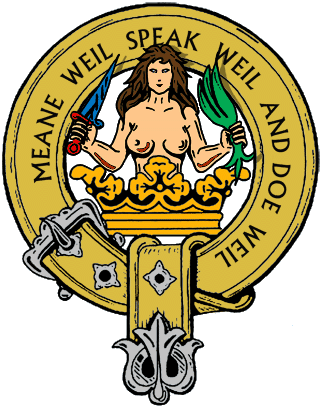
- Motto: Meane weil, speak weil and doe weil.
- War cry: Trust and go forward

Profile
- Plant badge: Cheiranthus, a wallflower

Chief
- Colonel Wilkins Urquhart of Urquhart
- 28th Chief of Clan Urquhart

Urquhart (/ˈɜːr.kərt/, UR-kərt) is a Highland Scottish clan. The clan dates to the 13th–century and is most associated with the area of Cromarty. In modern times, there are two parishes in Scotland named Urquhart, one in Elgin and one on the Black Isle. There is also most famously Urquhart Castle, by Glen Urquhart and on the banks of Loch Ness, which takes its name from the old barony of Urquhart.

== History ==
William de Urchard is said to have defended the Moote of Cromarty in the time of William Wallace against supporters of the English Crown. From the reign of David II of Scotland, the Urquhart chiefs were hereditary sheriffs of Cromarty.

=== 16th–century and Anglo Scottish wars ===
Thomas Urquhart of Cromarty is said to have sired 25 sons in the early sixteenth–century. However, seven of these sons were killed at the Battle of Pinkie Cleugh in 1547. Another Thomas Urquhart was born on the day of the Battle of Pinkie Cleugh and was knighted by James VI of Scotland.

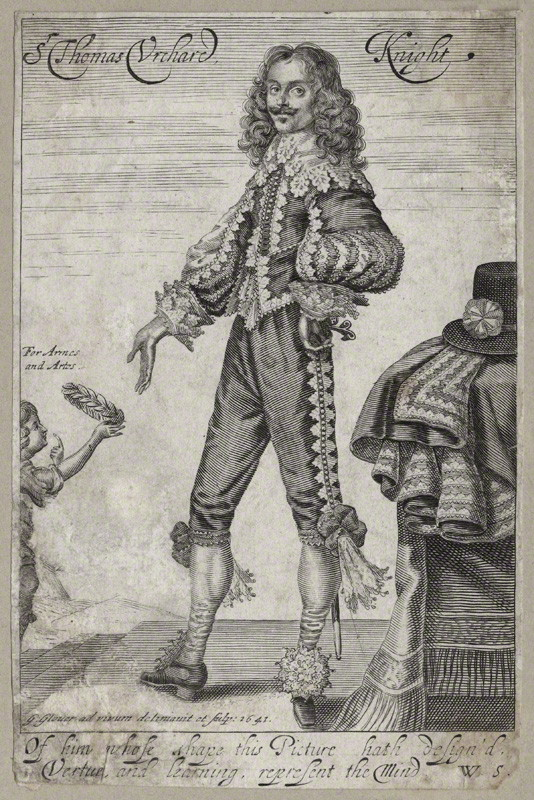
Sir Thomas Urquhart of Cromarty, 12th chief of Clan Urquhart, by George Glover, 1641

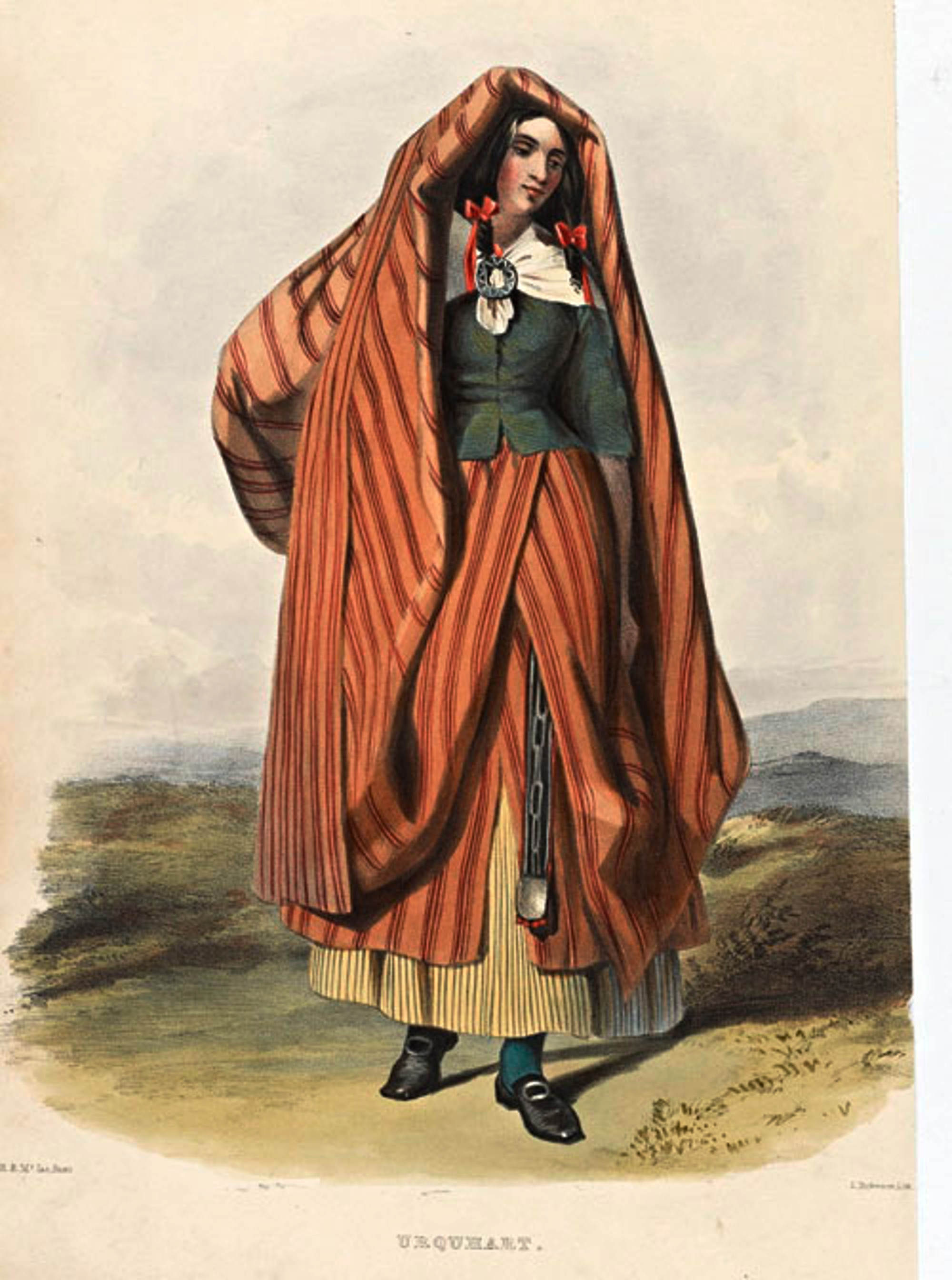
Romanticised depiction of a clan member, from The Clans of the Scottish Highlands, by R. R. McIan, 1845

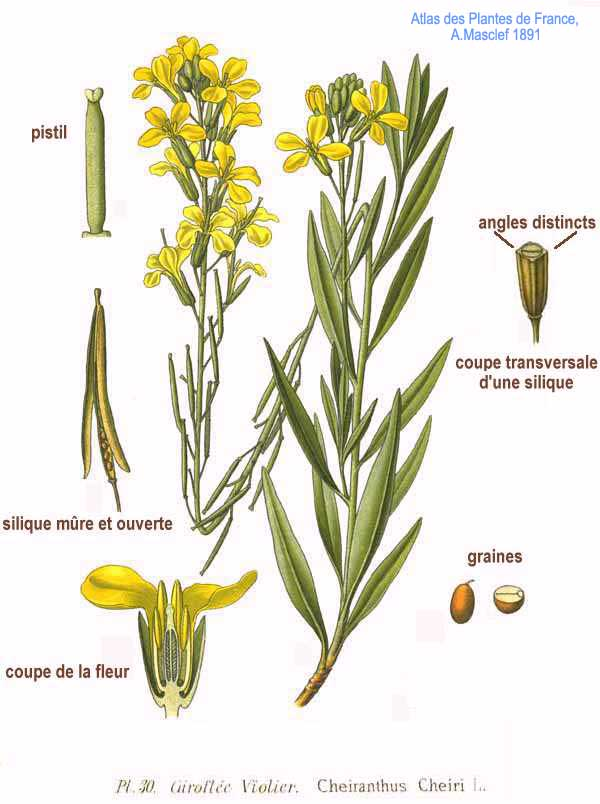
Wallflower, the clan plant badge

Rendition of the official tartan of Clan Urquhart

=== 17th–century and Civil War ===
Thomas Urquhart's son, Sir Thomas Urquhart of Cromarty became the 12th Chief of Clan Urquhart. He was a student at King's College, Aberdeen at the age of eleven. He was knighted by Charles I of England in 1641. After the Civil War he traveled to Europe and studied work by the French poet François Rabelais. Urquhart's translation of Rabelais's work is considered a masterpiece. He rejoined the royalist army and fought at the Battle of Worcester in 1651, where he was taken prisoner and imprisoned in the Tower of London. While in prison he wrote and published his family tree which shows the origins of the Urquhart family back to Adam and Eve. When he was released, he returned to Europe where he is said to have died from laughter while celebrating the Stuart Restoration in 1660.

=== 18th–century and Jacobite risings ===
Captain John Urquhart of Craigston (born 1696) was a man of great wealth but the origins of his fortune are shrouded in mystery. He was called the pirate by his family. He was recruited by the Spanish Navy and this is probably where he amassed his fortune, from the prize money that was paid for captured enemy vessels. He was nearly killed during the Jacobite rising of 1715 at the Battle of Sheriffmuir, fighting on the side of the Jacobites. The Urquhart of Craigston family became of such social eminence that they were able to get the great Henry Raeburn to paint their family portraits. Craigston Castle is still in the family's hands.

Colonel James Urquhart supported the Jacobite cause and was severely wounded at the Battle of Sheriffmuir. Until he died in 1741, he was the principal Jacobite agent in Scotland. The chiefship of the clan then passed to his cousin, William Urquhart of Meldrum, who was a cautious Jacobite and avoided the disaster at the Battle of Culloden. His cousin, Adam Urquhart was a member of Charles Edward Stuart's court–in–exile in Rome.

=== Modern history ===
The last of the chiefly line was Major Beauchamp Urquhart who was killed in 1898 at the Battle of Atbara in Sudan. In 1959 Wilkins Fisk Urquhart of that Ilk, a descendant of a branch of the clan known as the Urquharts of Braelangwell who had immigrated to the United States in the 18th century, established his right to be chief of the Clan Urquhart. In 1974, he was succeeded by his son, the historian Kenneth Trist Urquhart of Urquhart who was the 27th chief of the clan. Upon the death of Kenneth Urquhart in October 2012, his eldest son, Col. Wilkins Fisk Urquhart of Urquhart became the 28th chief of the clan. The chief's title is Urquhart of Urquhart.

== Clan profile ==
=== Etymology of the name ===
Urquhart is a name derived from the place name, Airchart. Airchart is first recorded in the early life of Saint Columba, the great Celtic saint. The meaning of the word Urquhart itself has been given various Scottish Gaelic translations including woodside, by a rowan wood, or fort on a knoll.

=== Clan chief ===
The current Clan chief is Colonel Wilkins Urquhart of Urquhart, 28th Chief of Clan Urquhart.

=== Coat of arms ===
The Urquhart chief's coat of arms features three erased red boar heads on a yellow shield. The shield is supported by two leased greyhounds, standing upright on their hind legs on top of a lawn of wallflowers. Above is the shield, is the crest–coronet or knight's helmet, surrounded by red and yellow wallflower blossoms and topped by a crown. A naked woman from the waist up emerges from a crest–coronet. She holds an azure sword in her right hand and a palm sapling in her left hand. She is surrounded by the clan motto on a curved scroll: Meane weil, speak weil, and doe weil.

One legend associated with Urquhart Castle involves Conachar of the royal house of Ulster, who is said to have come to Scotland to fight for Malcolm III of Scotland. Conachar was rewarded with the castle. There is no evidence for this, and the castle had yet to be built. The legend also says that Conachar was on the point of being mauled to death by a wild boar when his dog attacked the beast; although the dog died, it saved his master. This is one explanation for the boar's head and hounds on the Urquhart chief's coat of arms.

=== Crest Badge ===
The clan's crest badge is used to identify clan members and recognizes their loyalty to the chief. The Urquhart crest badge features a naked woman from the waist up issuing from a crest-coronet. Sometimes, the woman is referred to as a mermaid. She holds an azure sword in her right hand and a palm sapling in her left hand. She is encircled by a strap and buckle bearing the clan's motto "Meane Weil, Speak Weil and Doe Weil." The crest is taken from the chief's coat of arms.

=== Plant Badge ===
The clan's plant badge is cheiranthus (Latin name Erysimum cheiri), a wildflower that is native to Scotland. It is commonly called the wallflower.

=== Tartan ===
The earliest recorded Urquhart tartan is from the c. 1815 Cockburn Collection. That original cloth sample is stored at the Mitchell Library in Glasgow, Scotland. This Official Urquhart Red Line Tartan is still the Official Tartan of Clan Urquhart, as registered by the current Chief at Lyon Court. The clan recognizes two variants forms: Urquhart Broad Red Tartan and the Urquhart Ancient (White Line) Tartan. The latter is based on is based upon the Urquhart tartan design in the Vestiarium Scoticum by John Sobieski Stuart which was published in 1842. The chief registered the former in 1991.

Although formerly associated with the clan, the Urquhart "Logan" and the Urquhart "Brydone" tartans are now considered unofficial variants.

=== Castles ===
- Craigston Castle in Aberdeenshire has been a seat of the Urquhart family since it was built in 1604.
- Cromarty Castle was the main historic seat of the chiefs of Clan Urquhart. It is no longer standing except for a well. It was a 15th–century tower house that sat on the hill above the Black Isle town of Cromarty. It was demolished in 1771, and the present-day Cromarty House which is located on the site today was built from the stone and timbers of the former Urquhart stronghold.
- Castlecraig or Castle Craig, on the Black Isle now ruins was a castle held by the Clan Urquhart. It was a 15th–century fortress of the Urquharts of Cromarty of the Black Isle.
- Braelangwell, in the parish of Resolis, near Cromarty, on the Black Isle, is the site of a castle that was held by the Urquharts but was replaced by a mansion. The Urquharts held it from at least as early as the 17th century but sold it to the Frasers in 1839.
- Urquhart Castle, one of the most famous castles in the Highlands, sits beside Loch Ness at the convergence of Glen Urquhart and Urquhart Bay. The clan and the castle are named after the area, which is the ancient home of the Urquharts according to oral tradition. There is no evidence that Clan Urquhart was ever involved with Urquhart Castle. The early 13th–century castle is associated with several other Highland families and regimes, including the Durwards, the English crown, the Scottish crown, the MacDonalds, the Grants, the Jacobites, and the Covenanters until it was reduced to ruins by the government in 1690.

== See also ==
- Scottish clan
