= Penelope Dransart =

Anthropologist, archaeologist and historian

Penelope Dransart FSA

Academic background
- Education: University of Oxford
- Thesis: Fibre to fabric: the role of fibre in Camelid economies in prehispanic and contemporary Chile (1991)

Academic work
- Discipline: Archaeology; Anthropology; History
- Sub-discipline: Castellology
- Institutions: Institute of Latin American Studies; University of Wales Trinity Saint David; University of Aberdeen

Penelope Dransart FSA is an anthropologist, archaeologist, and historian specialising in South American anthropology and the study of castles. Until 2016 she was a Reader at University of Wales Trinity Saint David. She is Honorary Reader at the University of Aberdeen. Dransart was elected as a Fellow of the Society of Antiquaries of London in 1998. She has written or edited several books, including Earth, Water, Fleece and Fabric: An Ethnography and Archaeology of Andean Camelid Herding (2002, Routledge).

Dransart completed a DPhil at the University of Oxford in 1991, titled Fibre to fabric: the role of fibre in Camelid economies in prehispanic and contemporary Chile. Between 1992 and 1993, Dransart was a research fellow at the Institute of Latin American Studies. She has conducted fieldwork in the Andes since the 1980s and at Fetternear Palace in Scotland between 1995 and 2013 as part of the Scottish Episcopal Palaces Project. Dransart guest curated an exhibition about Fetternear at Blairs Museum in Aberdeen. She is part of the permanent committee of the Colloques Château Gaillard, a biannual conference for castellologists. Dransart is also Editor for Archaeology and Art for Studia Celtica, an academic journal about Celtic studies.

== Select publications ==
- Dransart, Penelope (1991). "Llamas, herders and the exploitation of raw materials in the Atacama Desert". World Archaeology. 22 (3): 304–319. doi:10.1080/00438243.1991.9980148. Wikidata Q57271122.
- Dransart, Penelope (2002). "Concepts of Spiritual Nourishment in the Andes And Europe: Rosaries in Cross-Cultural Contexts". Journal of the Royal Anthropological Institute. 8 (1): 1–21. doi:10.1111/1467-9655.00096. Wikidata Q61950086.
- Dransart, Penelope (2002). Earth, Water, Fleece and Fabric: An Ethnography and Archaeology of Andean Camelid Herding. London: Routledge. ISBN 0-415-27959-3. OL 17046091M. Wikidata Q106097676.
- Dransart, Penelope; Bogdan, Nicholas (2004). "The material culture of recusancy at Fetternear: kin and religion in post-Reformation Scotland". Proceedings of the Society of Antiquaries of Scotland. 134: 457–470. ISSN 0081-1564. Wikidata Q48574998.
- Dransart, Penelope (2008). "Prospect and excavation of moated sites: Scottish earthwork castles and house societies in the late twelfth to fourteenth centuries". Château Gaillard. Etudes de castellologie médiévale. 23: 115–128. ISSN 0577-5752. Wikidata Q48574710.
- Dransart, Penelope (2015). "Reconstruction of a chamfered doorway from a late 16th-century tower at Fetternear, Aberdeenshire" (PDF). The Castle Studies Group Journal. 29: 310–313. ISSN 2044-4605. Wikidata Q42355189.
- Dransart, Penelope (2016). "Bishops' palaces in the medieval dioceses of Aberdeen and Moray". Medieval Art, Architecture and Archaeology in the Dioceses of Aberdeen and Moray: 58–81. ISBN 978-1-315-63078-6. Wikidata Q106097717.
- Dransart, Penelope (2020). "A highland textile tradition from the far south of Peru during the period of Inka domination". PreColumbian Textile Conference VIII / Jornadas de Textiles PreColombinos VIII: 137–156. doi:10.32873/unl.dc.zea.1209. Wikidata Q106097770.

Edited

- Dransart, Penelope, ed. (1995), Andean Art: visual expression and its relation to Andean beliefs and values (in English and English), Avebury, OL 19025975W, Wikidata Q105104117
- Dransart, Penelope; Trigg, Jonathan, eds. (2008), The Bishop's Palace, Fetternear 2005-2006, University of Wales, Wikidata Q105087072
- Dransart, Penelope, ed. (2013). Living beings: perspectives on interspecies engagements. London: Bloomsbury Publishing. ISBN 978-0-85785-841-2. OL 26097828M. Wikidata Q106097823.
