= Meikle Wartle =

Village in Aberdeenshire, Scotland

Coordinates: 57.367690°N 2.464030°W

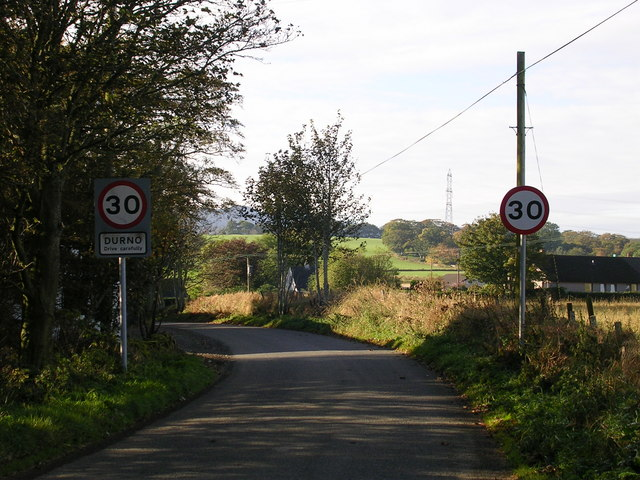
Speed limit sign in Durno

Meikle Wartle is a small rural village in Aberdeenshire, Scotland. It is around 7 miles north of Inverurie.

Local facilities include a village hall dating from 1888 (rebuilt in 2000), a garage and general store, a B&B and a public house. There is also a country house nearby, by the name of Wardhill Castle, owned by the Leslie clan and now run as a bed and breakfast. The village consists of a few older buildings surrounded by several newer buildings, and a housing estate built in 2008 and finished in 2016. The village is in the catchment area for Rayne North, a small school which consists of 3 classes and around 70 pupils.
