= Auchleven =

Village in Aberdeenshire, Scotland

Coordinates: 57.30°N 02.63°W

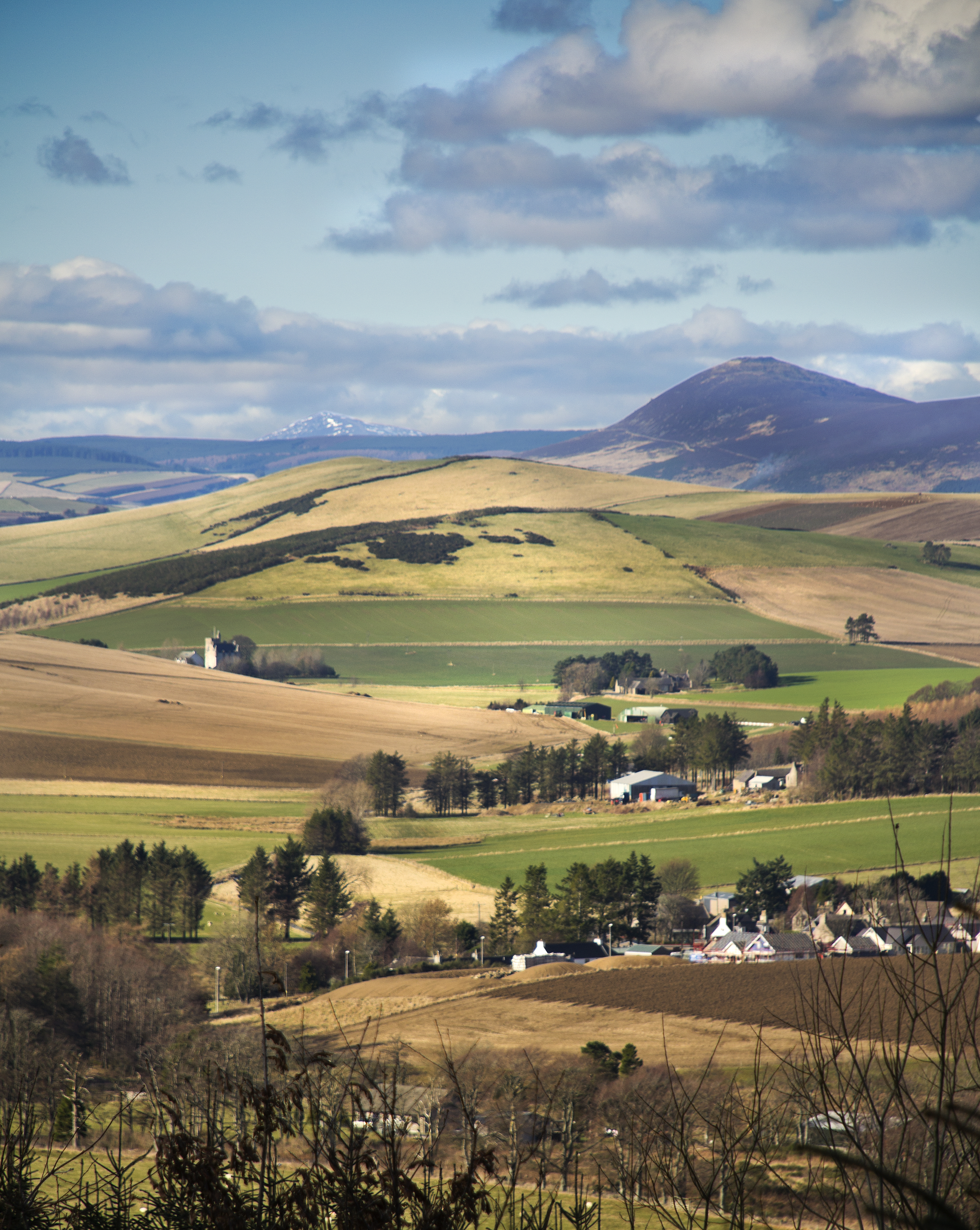

- Location within Aberdeenshire
- OS grid reference: NJ6224
- Council area: Aberdeenshire
- Lieutenancy area: Aberdeenshire
- Country: Scotland
- Sovereign state: United Kingdom
- Post town: INSCH
- Postcode district: AB52
- Dialling code: 01464
- Police: Scotland
- Fire: Scottish
- Ambulance: Scottish
- UK Parliament: Gordon and Buchan
- Scottish Parliament: Aberdeenshire West

Auchleven (Scottish Gaelic: Achadh Leamhan) is a village in Aberdeenshire, Scotland. Located approximately 4 miles (6 kilometres) south of Insch, 17 mi (27 km) south of Huntly and 12 mi (19 km) north-west of Inverurie.

It is also known as Premnay, the name of the parish in which it is located.

== Education ==
Premnay Primary School is a small co-educational primary school situated in the village of Auchleven on the B992, 6 miles (10 kilometres) south of Insch, and some 10 miles (16 kilometres) west of Inverurie. The school provides for pupils at the P1 to P7 stages in the Parish of Premnay. The school has served the community for over 120 years on the present site, and the current building was built in 1909. At the end of P7, the pupils normally transfer to the Gordon Schools in Huntly or Inverurie Academy in Inverurie for secondary education.

== Notable sights ==
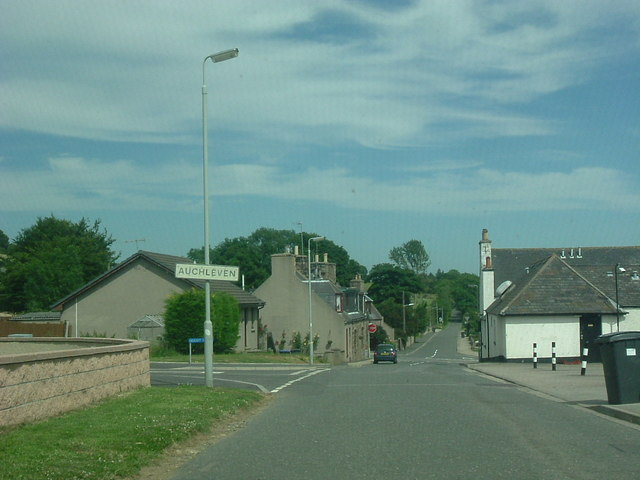
Entrance to Auchleven

The Gadie Burn runs through Auchleven (Premnay.)

== Lickleyhead Castle ==
Lickleyhead Castle is thought to have been built in 1560 by William Leith, quite possibly on the site of an earlier structure. It was bought by the Forbes family in 1625: John Forbes added a stair tower on the SW corner, and the 1629 date stone above the main entrance. The castle was sold to the Duff family in 1723 and later to the Lumsdens.

In 1922, the castle was sold to Don Guillermo de Landa y Escamdon, the Governor of Mexico City, for his daughter Maria Luz, who had married into the Arbuthnott-Leslie family. The castle remains a residence of Clan Leslie.

== Facilities ==
- Primary School
- Village Hall
- Pub
- Park
- Phone Box

== Notes ==
Council, Aberdeenshire. "Premnay Primary School".
