= Craigston Castle =

Scottish castle

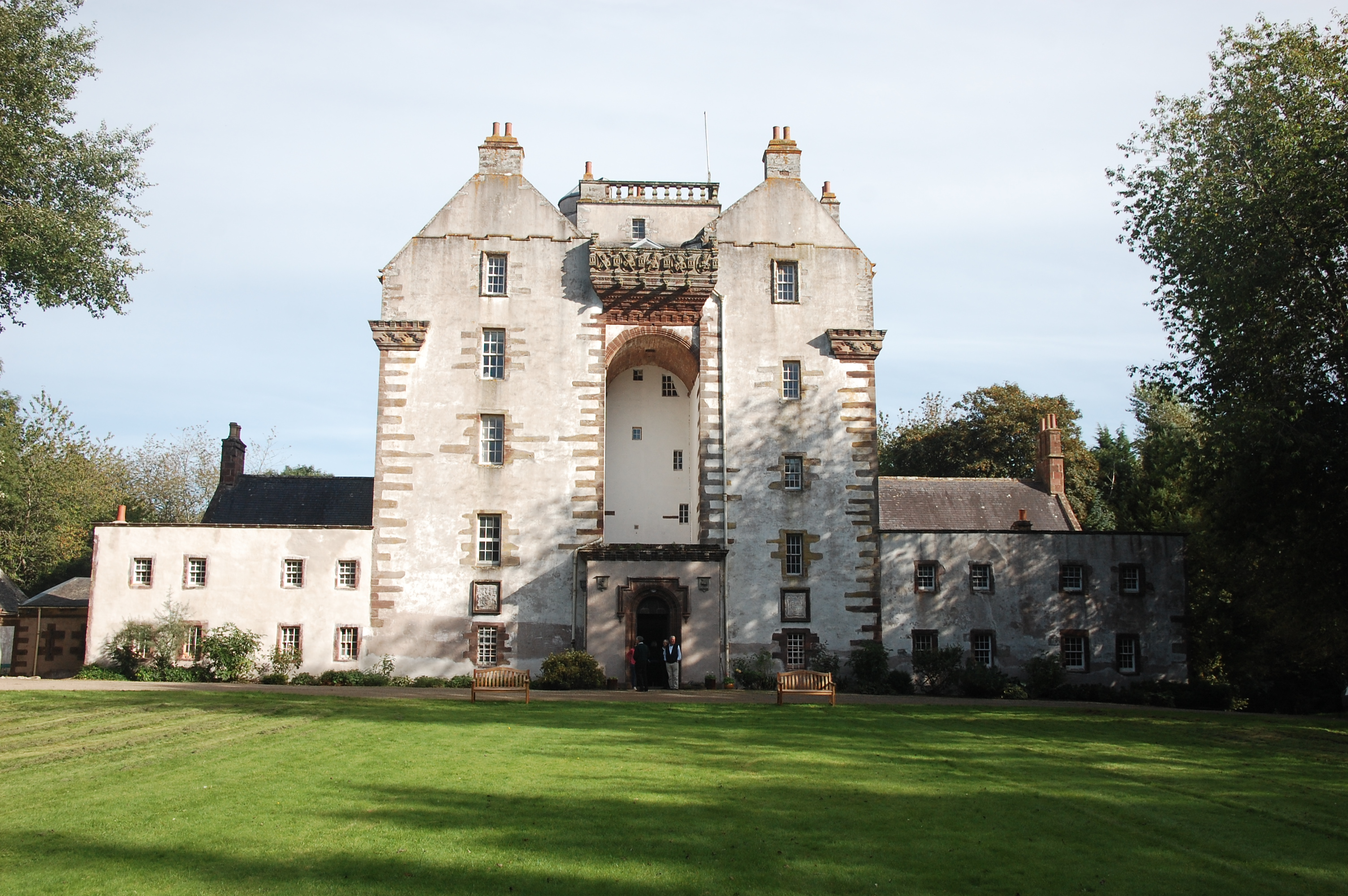
- Craigston Castle in 2016
- Interactive map of the Craigston Castle area
- Alternative names: Craigfintray Castle

General information
- Status: Completed
- Type: Country House
- Location: Craigston Castle; AB53 5PX, Turriff, Aberdeenshire, Scotland
- Coordinates: 57°35′4″N 2°23′56″W
- Construction started: 14 March 1604; 422 years ago
- Completed: 8 December 1607; 418 years ago
- Owner: William P. Urquhart of Craigston

Height
- Height: 67 feet (20 metres)

Technical details
- Material: Rubble, sandstone
- Floor count: 6 (central tower block)
- Grounds: 250 acres (100 hectares)

Design and construction
- Architect: John Bell
- Developer: John Urquhart of Craigfintry

Website
- www.craigston-castle.co.uk

Listed Building – Category A
- Official name: Craigston Castle
- Designated: 24 November 1972
- Reference no.: LB9392

Craigston Castle is a 17th-century country house located about 4 miles (6.4 kilometres) north-east of Turriff, Aberdeenshire, Scotland, and is a historic home of the Urquhart family. The U-plan castle has two main wings flanking the entrance, connected by an elevated arch, and is surmounted by a richly corbelled parapet. There are bases for corner turrets near the tops of each wing, but the turrets themselves do not appear to have been completed. The wood carvings in the drawing room depict biblical themes and heraldry associated with Clan Urquhart.

== History ==
Craigston Castle belongs to the "Bell group" of Scottish castles, designed by masons of the Bell or Bel family. According to H. Gordon Slade, these castles "together form perhaps Scotland’s finest and the most distinctive contribution to Western architecture". The castle is still owned and lived in by the Urquhart family, who trace their descent back to Adam Urquhart, 14th-century sheriff of Cromarty, although according to Sir Thomas Urquhart, translator of Rabelais, the family can be traced back to Adam and Eve through "Termuth", who he states found Moses in the rushes, as well as many other fantastic ancestors.

John Urquhart of Craigfintry (1547-1631), known as the "Tutor of Cromarty", built the castle from 1604 to 1607, and the design of the castle appears to show his influence as compared with other examples of the "Bell group". It was sold by the Urquharts in 1657, but bought back in 1739 by Captain John Urquhart, known as "the pirate", great-grandson of the builder. The new owner built the flanking wings, and laid out new gardens, though apparently not to the designs prepared in 1733 by William Adam, the foremost architect of the time. In the 1830s, John Smith, the architect of Balmoral Castle, prepared designs for an extensive remodelling, though only a new entrance doorway was built. Craigston Castle is now a category A listed building. The Urquhart family retain possession of the castle, and have recently started to host weddings and other events, as well as letting it out as accommodation.

== Gallery ==
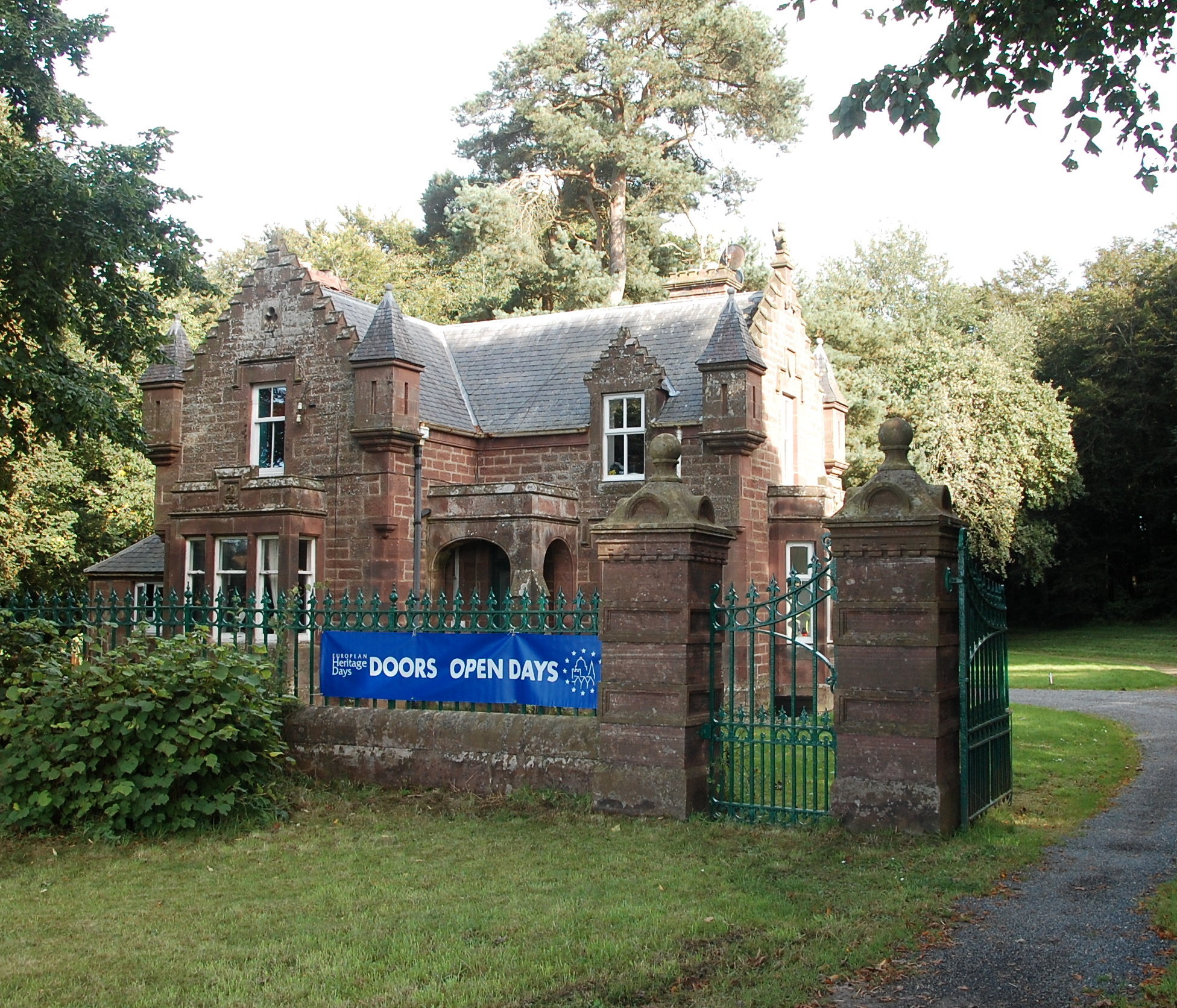
South lodge (2016)

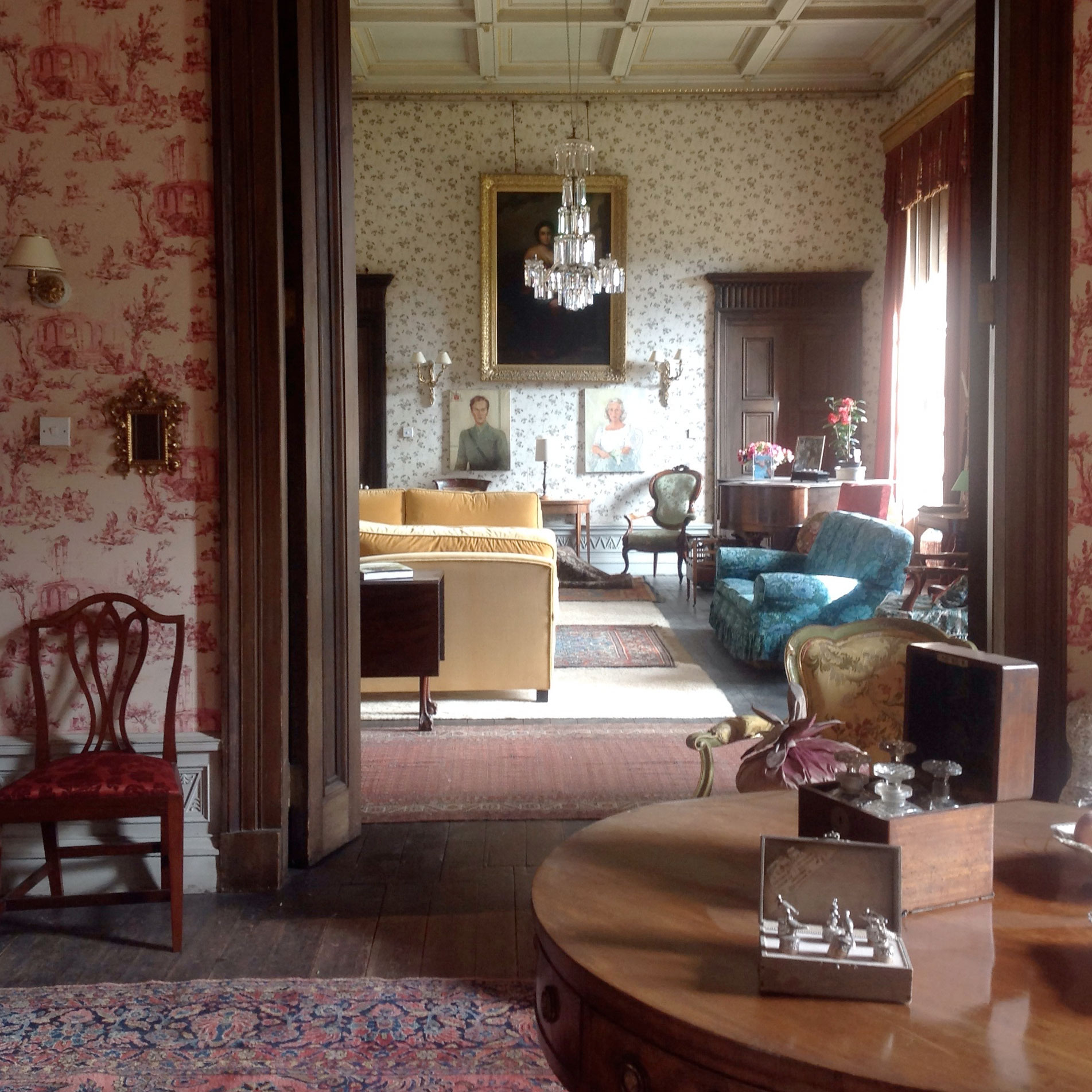
Castle drawing room (2014)

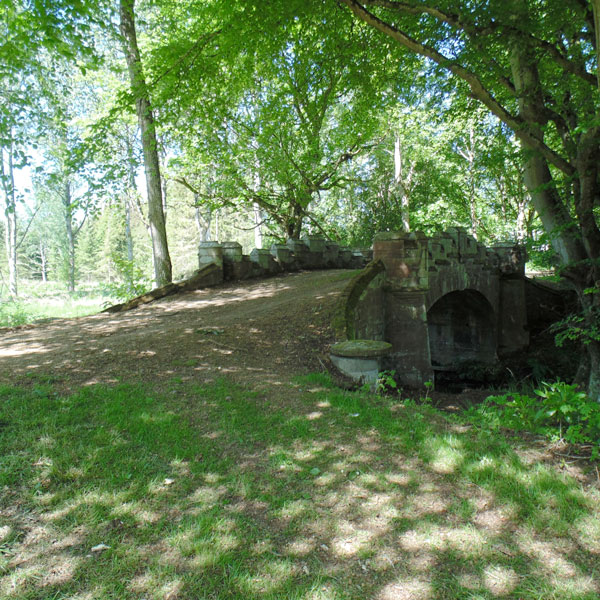
Castle grounds (2014)

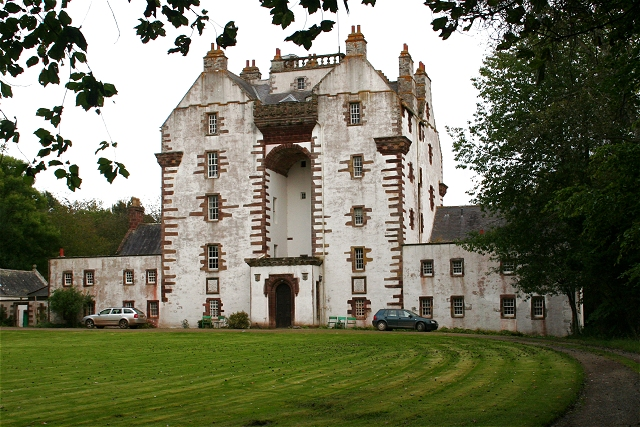
The castle in 2007
