= Guillermo Landa y Escandón =

Mexican politician (1842–1927)

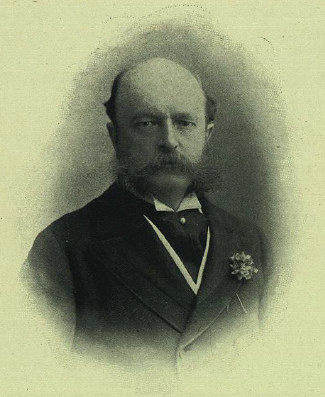

Governor of the Federal District
- In office 8 October 1900 – 7 December 1900
- Preceded by: Rafael Rebollar
- Succeeded by: Ramón Corral

Governor of the Federal District
- In office 3 January 1903 – 2 May 1911
- Preceded by: Ramón Corral
- Succeeded by: Samuel García Cuéllar

Personal details
- Born: José Guillermo Atanasio Guadalupe Francisco de Paula del Corazón de Landa y Escandón; 2 May 1842 Mexico City, Mexico
- Died: March 1, 1927 (aged 84) Cannes, France
- Spouse: Sofía de Ossio y del Barrio
- Education: Stonyhurst College

Guillermo Landa y Escandón (2 May 1842 – 1 March 1927) was a Mexican politician and businessman. He was governor of the Federal District of Mexico. He was one of the Porfirio Díaz administration's Científicos.

== Early life ==
Landa was born on 2 May 1842 as the son of José María Casto Francisco Javier Landa Martínez (Mexico City, 22 May 1811–Mexico City, 10 February 1876), a member of the Council of Notables of the Second Mexican Empire, and wife (24 April 1843) María Francisca Escandón Garmendia (Puebla, 10 September 1815–1869), a Lady-in-waiting to the Empress Charlotte (wife of Maximilian I of Mexico).

He studied at Stonyhurst College, the Jesuit independent school on the Stonyhurst Estate, Lancashire, England, from 1858 to 1862.

== Career ==
A prominent Mexican politician and businessman, Landa served as the governor of the Federal District of Mexico.

He was also the official Mexican representative at the Coronation of Edward VII and Alexandra.

== Personal life ==
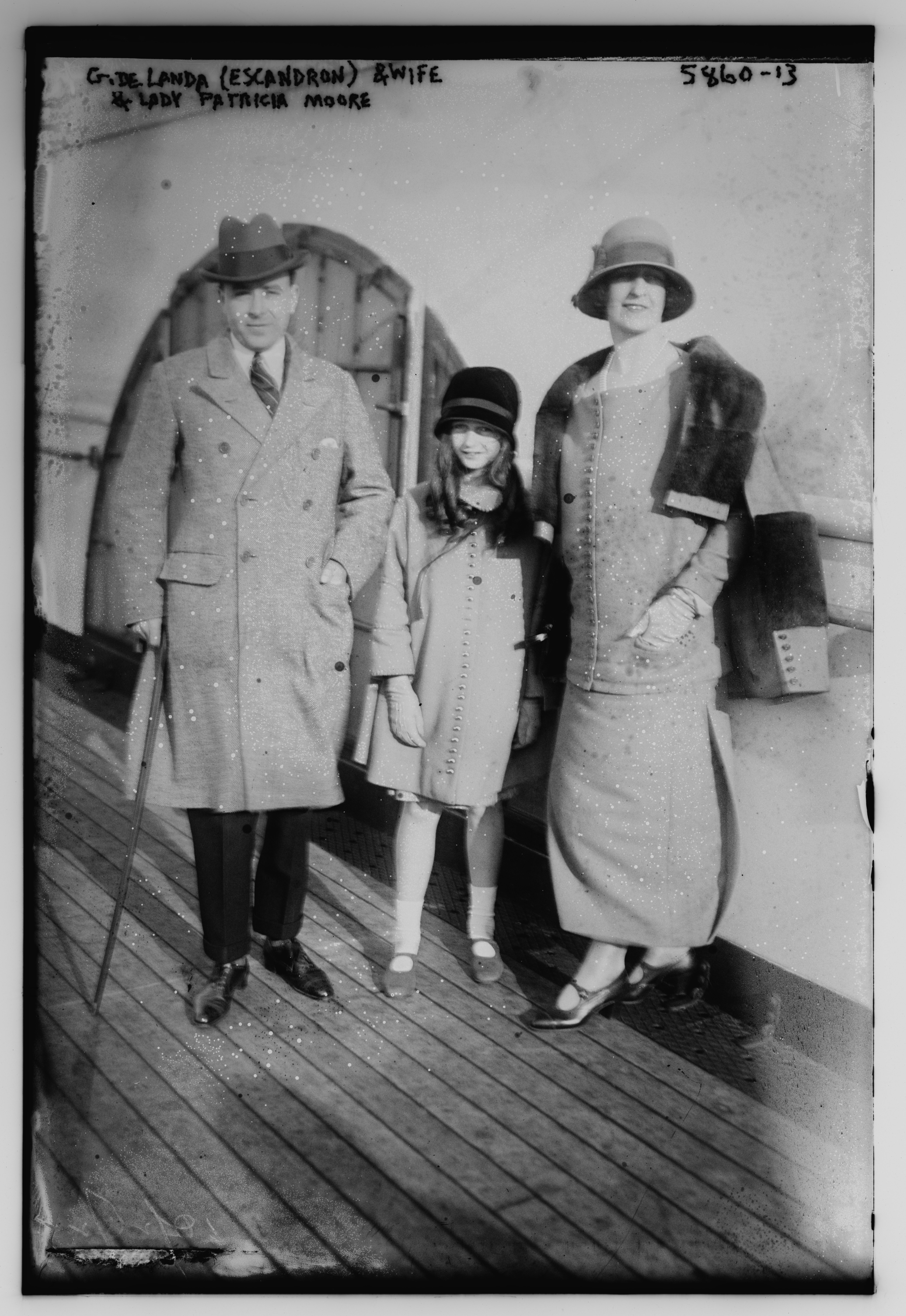
Photograph of his son, Billy, and his new wife, Kathleen Moore, Countess of Drogheda, with her daughter, Lady Patricia Moore, October 25, 1922

Guillermo married in Mexico City on 16 May 1891 María de Los Angeles Sofía Rafaela de la Asunción de Ossio y del Barrío (Mexico City, 1 August 1867–Paris, 9 September 1932), daughter of Francisco de Ossio y de Allende and wife Manuela del Barrío y Rengel. Together, they were the parents of:

- María de la Luz de Landa y Ossio (1880–1969), who married Sebastian Bernardo de Mier in 1910. After his death in 1917, she married William Douglas Arbuthnot-Leslie, 13th of Warthill. As a wedding present, he bought them Lickleyhead Castle. After they divorced in 1944, she married Capt. Ronald Edward Warlow.
- Guillermo "Billy" de Landa y Ossio (1894–1948), a playboy who married British socialite Kathleen Moore, Countess of Drogheda (former wife of Henry Moore, 10th Earl of Drogheda), in 1922. They divorced in 1929.
- Sofía de Landa y Ossio (1898–1964), who married Guillermo Limantour y Cañas.
- Carmen de Landa y Ossio (b. 1901), who married Juan Francisco de Béistegui Yturbe.
- José Manuel "Pepe" de Landa y Ossio, who married Virginia (née Willys) de Aguirre, former wife of Argentine rancher Luis Marcelino de Aguirre, and daughter of the former U.S. Ambassador to Poland, John Willys.

Landa died in Cannes, France on 1 March 1927.

=== Descendants ===
He is a great-great-grandparent of actress Rose Leslie and attorney Alexander Clark.
