= Clan Leslie =

Lowland Scottish clan

- Crest: A demi griffin Proper, armed, beaked and winged Or
- Motto: Grip fast

Profile
- Region: Lowlands
- District: Aberdeenshire
- Plant badge: Rue

Chief
- Hon. Alexander Leslie
- Seat: Wardhill Castle
- Historic seat: Balquhain Castle
Septs of Clan Leslie
Abernathy, Abernethy, Bartholomew, Cairney, Laing, Leslie, Lesley, Lessely, Lessley, Lesslie, More
Allied clans
Clan Campbell
Clan Kerr

Clan Leslie is a Lowland Scottish clan. The progenitor of the clan, Bartolf, was a nobleman from Hungary, who came to Scotland in 1067. He built a castle at Leslie, from which the clan name derives.

== Clan chief, the Earl of Rothes ==
From 1457 the chief of Clan Leslie also held the position of Earl of Rothes. The chief is currently the Hon. Alexander Leslie, the brother of James Malcolm David Leslie, 22nd Earl of Rothes (born 1958).

== History ==
Leslie tartan

=== Origins ===
Coat of arms of Lords of Leslie

The first Leslie in Aberdeenshire was Alexander, who was appointed constable of the Bass of Inverurie in 1080 on behalf of the king, his brother-in-law.

The progenitor of the clan was Bartolf, a nobleman from Hungary who came to Scotland in 1067. Bartolf was in the retinue of Edgar the Ætheling, brother of Margaret, who was later the queen of Malcolm III of Scotland. Bartholf later married Malcolm III's sister, Princess Beatrix.

Bartolf was said to be a man of intellect and bravery and as a result Malcolm III made him governor of the royal Edinburgh Castle and gave him estates in Fife, Angus, the Mearns and Aberdeenshire. It is said that Bartolf helped the queen across a dangerous river on a horse and that Bartolf told her to "grip fast", which is where the family motto originates.

Bartolf established himself in the Garioch district of Aberdeenshire, at a place then known as Lesselyn. At Lesselyn he built a castle and it is from there that the name evolved into Leslie, and the various spelling variations. Bartolf's son was named Malcolm and was made constable of the royal castle of Inverurie, which he held for David II of Scotland. His great-grandson was Sir Norman Leslie, who acquired the lands of Fythkill in Fife, later called Leslie after the family, in about 1282.

=== 14th to 15th centuries: Rothes and Balquhain ===
The family sided with Robert the Bruce against firstly The Comyn in the Buchan and secondly King Edward I, and as a result were awarded further tracts of Aberdeenshire. They fought at the Battle of Bannockburn in 1314. Sir Sir Andrew de Leslie was one of the signatories of the Declaration of Arbroath, and was sent to the Pope in 1320 to assert Scotland's independence. His grandson, Walter, died at the Battle of Harlaw in 1411, together with six of his cousins from Balquhain.

The chiefly line of the Clan Leslie passed to a junior branch of the family, from whom the present Earl of Rothes descends. In 1391, Sir Norman Leslie believed that his only son, David, had been killed in the Crusades, and therefore passed over his estates to his cousin, Sir George Leslie. Then in 1398, after Sir George had taken possession of the castle and lands, David returned from the Crusades and claimed possession of his estate. The family managed to resolve the matter peacefully,and in 1445 Sir George Leslie's grandson, also called George, was created a Lord of Parliament as Lord Leslie of Leven, and all of his lands were united into the barony of Ballinbreich. At some point before 1458, he was then advanced to the title of Earl of Rothes.

=== 16th century ===
==== Rothes ====
The 2nd Earl of Rothes was killed along with his son at the Battle of Flodden in 1513. The 3rd Earl, also George, carried out a private family vendetta on the life of David Beaton, cardinal Archbishop of St Andrews. At the trial he was acquitted.

George Leslie, 4th Earl of Rothes, was one of the Scottish commissioners at the marriage of Mary, Queen of Scots, to the Dauphin of France in 1558. George, along with the Earl of Cassilis and two others, died in mysterious circumstances, believed to be poisoning, for refusing to allow the crown of Scotland to be settled on the Dauphin.

==== Balquhain ====
Fetternear, which became the home of the Leslies of Balquhain, Wardes, and Warthill includes the remains of a 14th-century palace, the home of Bishop Alexander Kininmund, who, in 1320, drafted the Declaration of Arbroath, the letter sent to Pope John XXII in Avignon declaring that the Scots would never be subjected to English rule. It also incorporates the remains of even earlier palaces and sites of settlement dating back 4,000 years.

John Leslie, Bishop of Ross, was born in 1526. He was the most loyal of Queen Mary's supporters during the turbulent times of 1562. It was John Leslie who wrote for her the famous History of Scotland. He, the second baron of Wardes, was awarded extensive lands in the Garioch from James IV and was five times married. He is now represented in the Garioch by the Leslies of Warthill descended from his second son.

=== 17th century ===
During the 17th century, Leslies fought in Germany, France, Sweden and the Baltic as mercenaries. Alexander Leslie, 1st Earl of Leven, fought on the Continent and then returned to Scotland to command the Covenanter army. His seat was Balgonie Castle, which he improved and extended. Alexander Leslie won a great victory over the English royalists at the Battle of Newburn in 1640.

==== Wars of the Three Kingdoms ====
Commanding the Covenanters Alexander Leslie, 1st Earl of Leven, and General Robert Monro captured Edinburgh Castle with a thousand men.

With the Scots, Leven went into England in 1640 and defeated the King's soldiers at the Battle of Newburn. For this, he was created Earl of Lewis by King Charles I. General Alexander Leslie of Balgonie fought for Gustavus Adolphus, the King of Sweden. He achieved great fame across Europe for his skills in war and returned to Scotland a Field Marshal.

In 1642, Leven went to Ireland and held command alongside Robert Munro (d. 1680) of the Scottish Army. They were sent to put down a rebellion of Irishmen who had killed Scots in Ulster. In 1644, Leven commanded Scottish Covenanter forces to victory over English Royalists at the Battle of Marston Moor in 1644. This battle was the largest battle of the English and Scottish Civil War, and one of the most decisive. It resulted in a Parliamentarian victory, which meant that the north of England was effectively lost to King Charles for the rest of the war.

During the Civil War, General David Leslie, Lord Newark, was victorious commanding his Scottish Covenanters force against a Scottish Royalist force at the Battle of Philiphaugh in 1645. The Royalist army of James Graham, 1st Marquess of Montrose, was destroyed by the Covenanter army of Sir David Leslie, restoring the power of the Committee of Estates.

Dunaverty Castle was a MacDonald stronghold. During the Civil War, it was besieged in 1647 by Scottish supporters of Oliver Cromwell who were led by David Leslie, from Clan Leslie. The MacDonalds surrendered and then 300 of them were massacred. The castle is nothing more than a ruin now, known as Blood Rock.

During the Civil War, David Leslie laid siege to the Royalist garrison at Kincardine Castle. The Castle was being held by the Chief of Clan MacNab. MacNab found that it would not be possible to maintain defense. During the night, sword in hand, at the head of 300 men, they cut their way through the besieging force. All made it through apart from the MacNab chief himself and one other man who were captured and sent to Edinburgh as prisoners of war. The chief was sentenced to death but he escaped and rejoined King Charles and continued to fight. Leslie's Scottish Covenanter force was defeated by the Scottish Parliamentarian forces who were at this point in time loyal to the Parliament of England and Oliver Cromwell at the Battle of Dunbar (1650). Leslie successfully commanded the Scottish Argyll Government Royalist forces at the Battle of Carbisdale (1650) where he was victorious against Scottish Royalist forces commanded by James Graham, 1st Marquess of Montrose.

Leslie's Royalist Forces were defeated at the Battle of Worcester in 1651. Leslie, who was now commanding Royalist forces, had supported the plan of fighting in Scotland, where royal support was strongest. King Charles, however, insisted on making the war in England.

Leslie was captured and imprisoned in the Tower of London where he remained until the restoration of 1660.

==== Balquhain ====
The career of Walter Leslie was all in Europe, where in the Thirty Years War he rose to prominence after leading the assassination of the Imperial generalissimo Wallenstein and his coterie in 1634, becoming a field marshal and imperial count.

Sir Alexander Leslie of Auchintool was a general in the Russian army and was Governor of Smolensk. The seventh Earl of Rothes was created Duke of Rothes by Charles II in 1680.

=== 18th century ===
John Hamilton-Leslie, 9th Earl of Rothes, was Vice Admiral of Scotland and governor of the royal Stirling Castle. During the Jacobite rising of 1715, he supported the British government and commanded a regiment of cavalry at the Battle of Sheriffmuir. He sold much of the clan estates but Leslie House near Fife remained the seat of the chiefly Earls until 1926.

== Castles and great houses ==
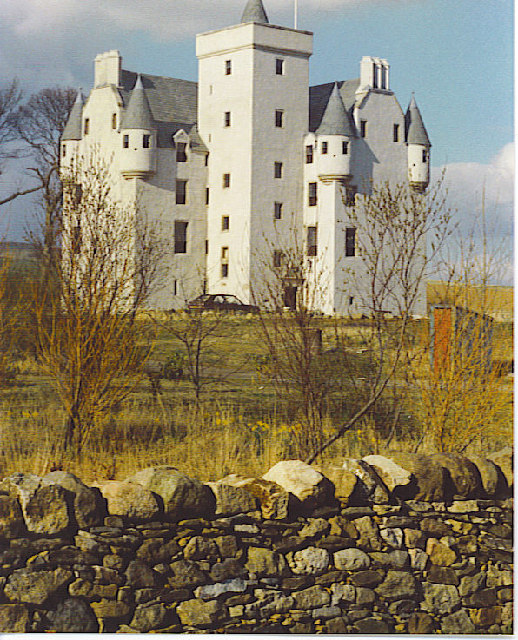
Leslie Castle in 1989

- The Bass, the original Clan Leslie wooden castle built in 1080–1085. The remains can still be seen down by the River Ury in Inverurie next to the Celtic burial mounds.
- Leslie Castle in Aberdeenshire is a 17th-century tower house but stands on the site of an earlier fortification. The Leslies held the lands from at least the eleventh or twelfth century and there was once a courtyard and moat which have now gone.
- Castle Leslie in County Monaghan, Ulster, Ireland. Built in the 17th century, the castle and surrounding 1,000-acre (4.0 km^{2}) estate is still a Leslie residence, and an exclusive guest house, spa and school for cuisine. In 2002 Sir Paul McCartney married Heather Mills in the Family Church just adjacent to the castle.
- Fetternear Palace in Aberdeenshire, the Leslies built a tower house here in the 1560s. The castle passed to the Abercrombies in 1627 but later returned to the Leslies who kept there the Fetternear Banner, which was a pre-Reformation banner of the fraternity of the Holy Blood.
- Balquhain Castle in Aberdeenshire was held by the Leslies from 1340 but was sacked during a feud with the Clan Forbes in 1526.
- Balgonie Castle was acquired by Alexander Leslie in 1635.
- Leslie House in Fife was owned by the Leslies until 1919, when a major fire destroyed most of the house and its contents.
- Kininvie Manor House in the Spey Valley near Rothes. Has been held by the Leslies since 1521 and they apparently still own the property. Originally part of the Balquhain Leslies' estates, then purchased by the second son of the Earl of Rothes (1936), currently the home of Colonel David Leslie.
- Lickleyhead Castle in Auchleven, Aberdeenshire, built circa 1450, was owned by the Leslies until 2018.
- Wardhill Castle in Meikle Wartle, Aberdeenshire passed to the Leslies in 1518 and is still owned by their descendants.
- Wardhouse in Aberdeenshire was held by the Leslies in the 16th century but later passed to the Clan Gordon.
- Rothie House – owned by a cadet of Lord Rothes, the Crawford-Leslie family. The family died out after the only son was killed on active service at the Battle of Anzio in Italy in 1944.
