= Achnahannet =

Achnahannet is the name of several hamlets in Scotland:

- Achnahannet, Strathspey
- Achnahannet, Loch Ness
- Achnahannet, Ross and Cromarty
