= Alexander Pilche =

Scottish burgess

Alexander Pilche was a 13th-century Scottish burgess. He joined with Andrew de Moray during the 1297 uprising in northern Scotland against the administration and overlordship of King Edward I of England. He was the Governor of Inverness Castle on behalf of the English in 1304, before being replaced in 1305 and joining King Robert I of Scotland's campaign in Moray in 1307. As a reward he was appointed Sheriff of Inverness until his death.

Alexander a burgess of Inverness, led a force joining Andrew de Moray at Avoch Castle. Alexander became de Moray's trusted lieutenant. Alexander and de Moray ambushed Sir William fitz Warin who was returning to Urquhart Castle accompanied his retinue, after meeting with Sir Reginald le Chen ordered at Inverness Castle on 25 May 1297. The ambush was set a few miles to the south of Inverness. William fitz Warin was able to escape, with the loss of a number of men and horses to Urquhart Castle. The next day, Sir William awoke to find his castle besieged by de Moray and Alexander, who demanded its surrender. Euphemia, the Countess of Ross unexpectedly arrived on the scene with her retinue. The countess, whose husband was held by King Edward in the Tower of London, advised de Moray and Alexander to surrender. Although her advice was ignored, she did not move against Moray and Alexander, her actions were later commended to the king by Sir William. Moray, with no heavy siege equipment available to him, tried to take the castle in a night attack, resulting in the death of fitz Warin's son Robert, and having failed, was forced to abandon the siege.

Pilche appears to have entered Edward I's peace and was Governor of Inverness Castle, holding the castle on behalf of the English in 1304. He was replaced in 1305 by John de Stirling. During the campaign of King Robert I of Scotland in Moray in 1307, Pilche was an adherent and was instrumental in the fall of Inverness Castle. Alexander was subsequently appointed as the Sheriff of Inverness and held the position until his death.

== Bibliography ==
- Stirling Bridge and Falkirk, 1297-98: William Wallace's rebellion, Armstrong P & McBride A. Osprey 2003.
- The Scottish Historical Review, Volume 6, James Maclehose, Company of Scottish History, Edinburgh University Press for the Scottish Historical Review Trust, 1909.
