= Lenie, Scotland =

Coordinates: 57.30937°N 4.46397°W

Lenie: Scottish Gaelic: Lèanaidh
- Location within the Inverness area
- OS grid reference: NH516269
- Council area: Highland
- Country: Scotland
- Sovereign state: United Kingdom
- Post town: Drumnadrochit
- Postcode district: IV63 6
- Police: Scotland
- Fire: Scottish
- Ambulance: Scottish

Lenie (Scottish Gaelic: Lèanaidh) is a small hamlet consisting of Lower Lenie and Upper Lenie, situated on the north-western shore of Loch Ness in Inverness-shire, Scottish Highlands, and is in the Highland council area of Scotland.

Urquhart Castle, which sits on Strone Point, lies 2 kilometres (1.2 mi) north-east along the A82 road. Achnahannet lies just to the southwest.

== Gallery ==
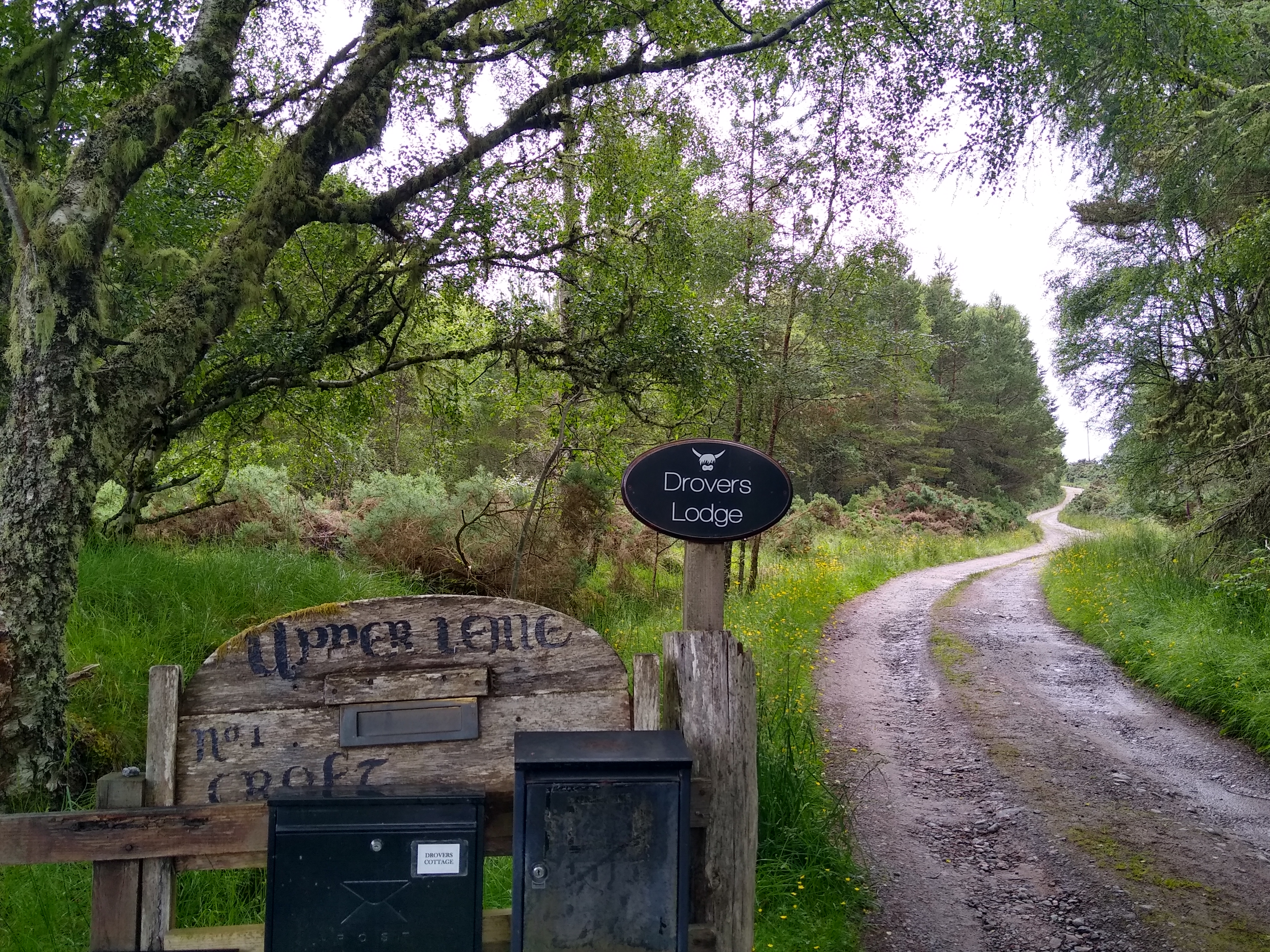

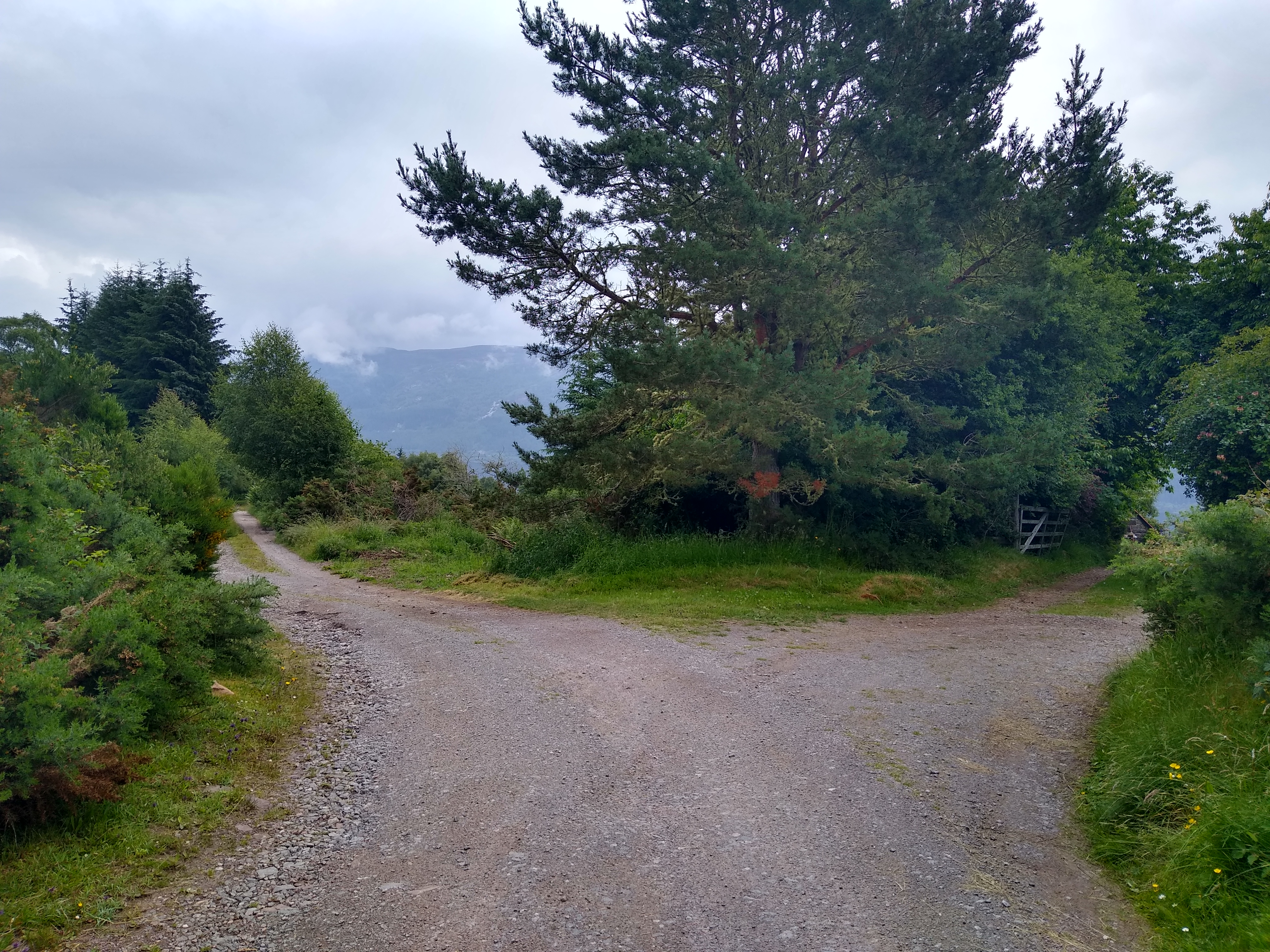

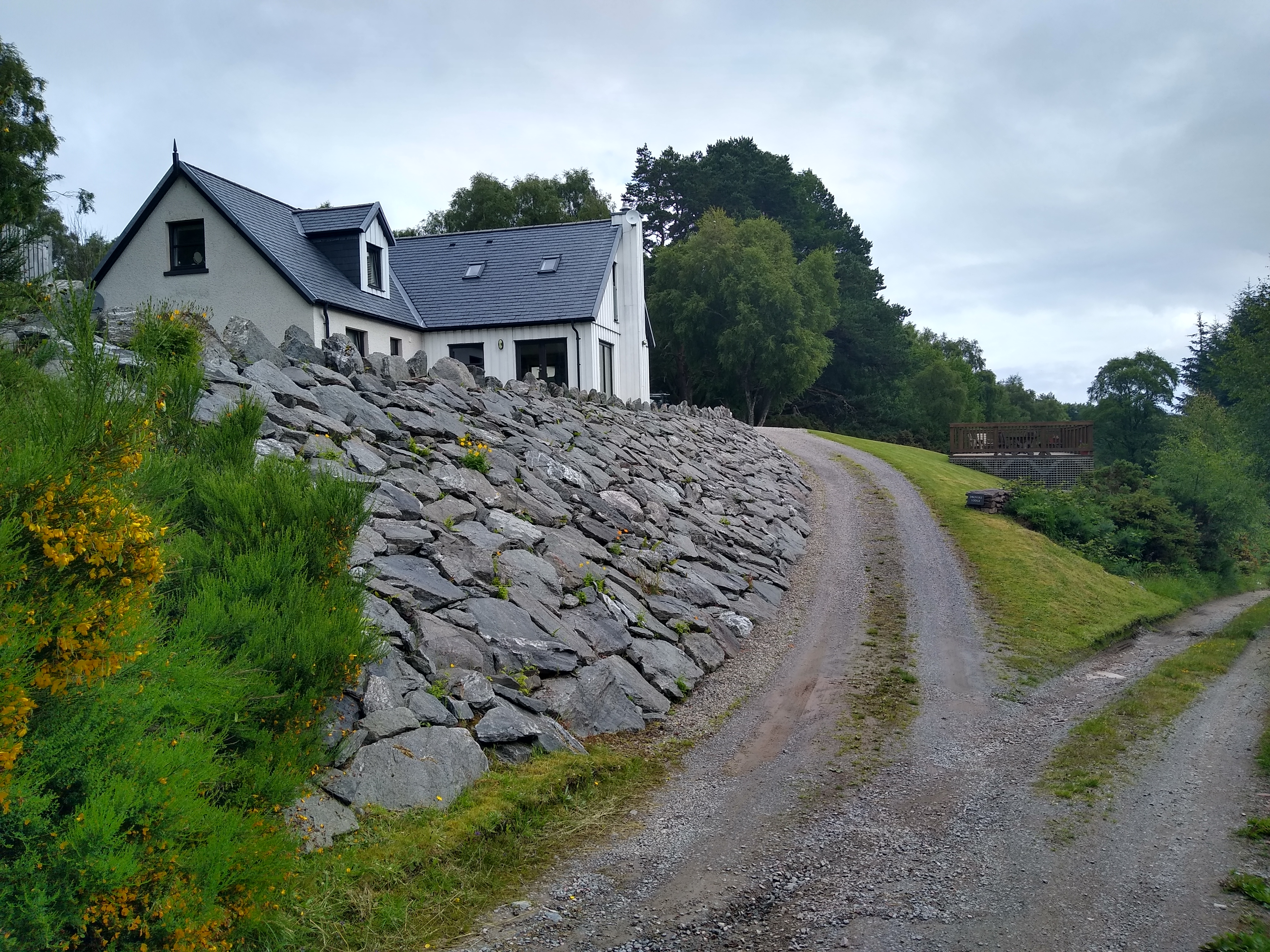
