= Andrew Moray =

13th-century Scottish esquire

Personal details
- Born: Scotland, exact place of birth unknown
- Died: 1297
- Cause of death: Due to wounds received at the Battle of Stirling Bridge
- Children: Sir Andrew Murray
- Parent(s): Sir Andrew Moray of Petty an unnamed daughter of John Comyn I of Badenoch
- Relatives: David Moray (uncle)
- Occupation: Military leader

Military service
- Allegiance: Kingdom of Scotland
- Years of service: 1297
- Rank: Commander
- Battles/wars: First War of Scottish Independence: Battle of Stirling Bridge

Andrew Moray (Anglo-Norman: Andreu de Moray; Latin: Andreas de Moravia), also known as Andrew de Moray, Andrew of Moray, or Andrew Murray, was a Scots esquire, who rose to prominence during the First Scottish War of Independence. He initially raised a small band of supporters at Avoch Castle in early summer 1297 to fight King Edward I of England and had soon successfully regained control of the north for the absent Scots king, John Balliol. Moray subsequently merged his army with that of William Wallace, and on 11 September 1297 jointly led the combined army to victory at the Battle of Stirling Bridge. He was severely wounded in the course of the battle, dying at an unknown date and place that year.

== Childhood ==
Andrew Moray the younger of Petty was born late in the second half of the 13th century. The date and place of his birth are unknown. Andrew's father was Sir Andrew Moray of Petty, an influential north Scotland baron and Justiciar of Scotia (1289?–1296), and his mother was the historically anonymous fourth daughter of John Comyn I of Badenoch.

Nothing is known of the formative years of Moray the younger's life. In common with other members of his social class, he likely embarked in his youth on the training for knighthood. This would have entailed him being fostered in the household of a mature knight outwith his family, where he would undergo training in horsemanship and in the use of weapons, he would care for the knight's armour and weapons, and for his horses. He would also serve the foster-knight meals at the table. It is not recorded that Moray attained knighthood within his lifetime.

== The Morays of Petty's place in Scottish society ==
The Morays of Petty were a wealthy and politically influential baronial family whose power base was located in the province of Moray in north-east Scotland. The family traced their origins to Freskin of Uphall, in Lothian, who was granted lands in the Laich of Moray during the 12th-century reign of King David I of Scotland. Freskin built a motte-and-bailey castle on these lands at Duffus on the north shore of Loch Spynie (this sea-loch was almost completely drained in the 18th and 19th centuries to bring hundreds of acres of land into agricultural use).

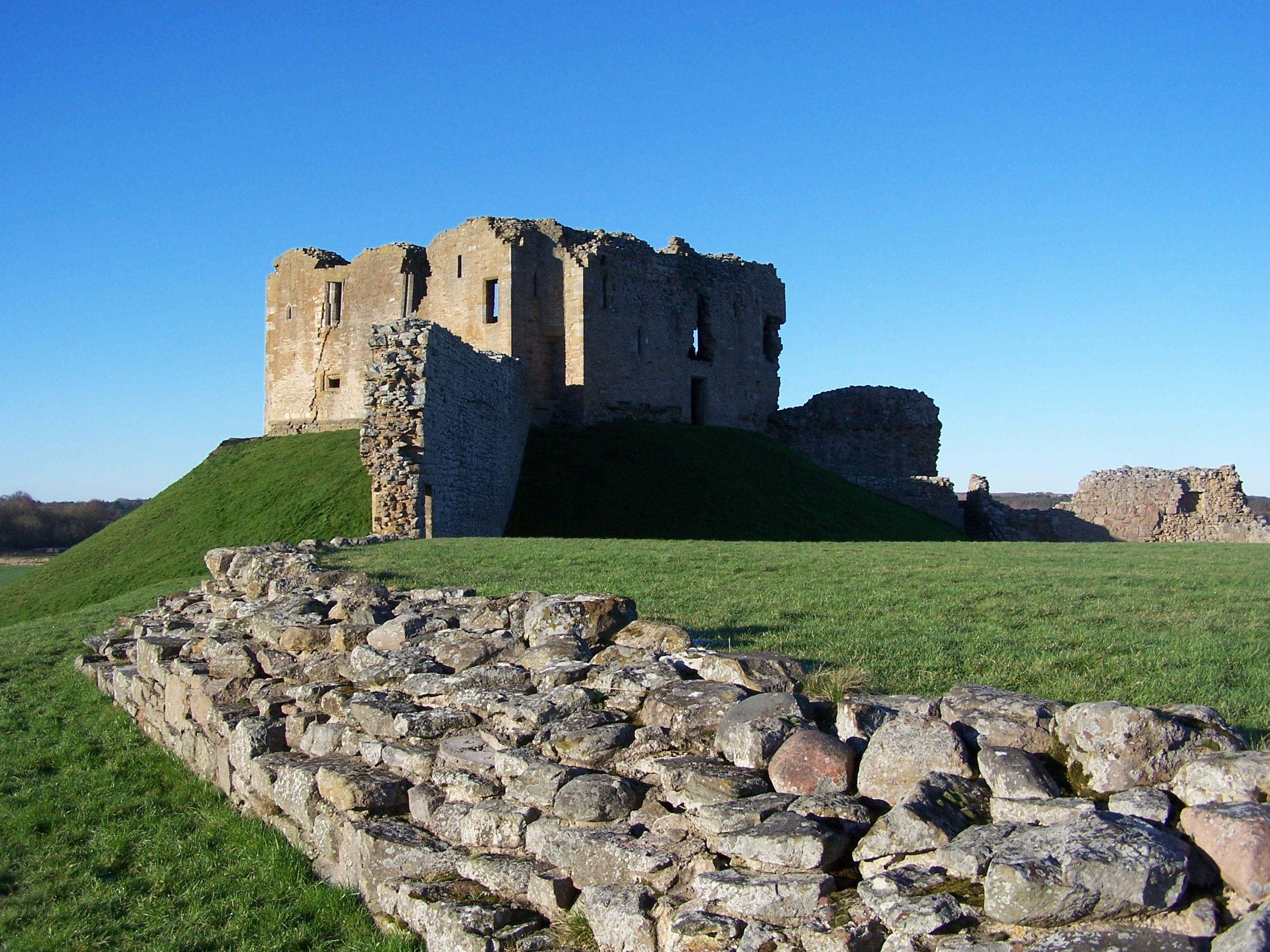
Duffus Castle. The stone-built bailey is a 14th-century addition to the site of Freskin's castle.

The Morays of Petty possessed significant political influence. The family were loyal agents of the Scots king. Sir Andrew Moray of Petty, head of the north branch of the family, acted from 1289 as the king's chief law officer in north Scotland (the Justiciar) and may have been co-opted to the guardianship following in the premature death of King Alexander III. He had close personal connections to the most politically influential family in Scottish society, the Comyns. Sir Andrew's first wife was a daughter of John (I) 'the Red' Comyn of Badenoch, and his second wife was Euphemia Comyn. The Morays of Petty also had links to the Douglases of Douglasdale.

In the thirteenth-century, the Moray family was established in north and south Scotland. Sir Andrew Moray held the lordship of Petty, which was controlled from Hallhill manor on the south bank of the Moray Firth; the lordship of Avoch in the Black Isle, controlled from Avoch Castle situated to the east of Inverness and overlooking the Moray Firth; and the lordship of Boharm in Banffshire, controlled from Gauldwell Castle. Amongst Sir Andrew's estates at Petty were lands at Alturile, Brachlie and Croy, and at Boharm were lands at Arndilly and Botriphnie. Andrew Moray the younger was heir to these lands and castles. Sir William Moray of Bothwell, the elder brother of Andrew the younger's father, held extensive lands in Lanarkshire and at Lilleford in Lincolnshire.

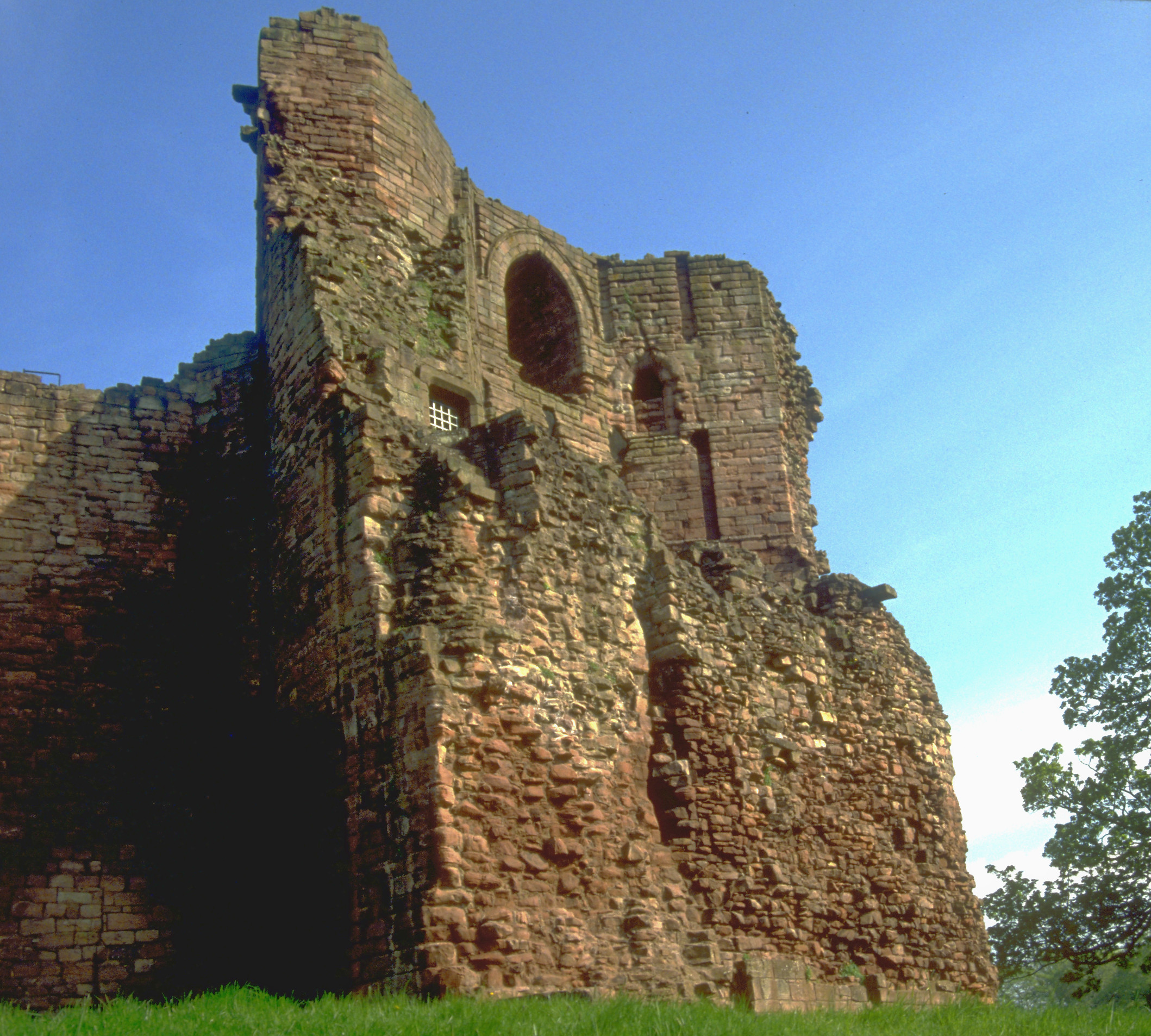
The donjon of Bothwell Castle, construction of which was begun by Sir William Moray before war broke out with England

Sir William, who was known as le riche due to his extensive personal wealth, was in 1296 constructing Bothwell Castle overlooking the River Clyde. Its design was influenced by the latest continental European trends in castle construction, for example Chateau de Coucy. It was clearly intended as an unequivocal statement of his influence and wealth. Andrew Moray the younger of Petty was also heir to his uncle's lands and castles.

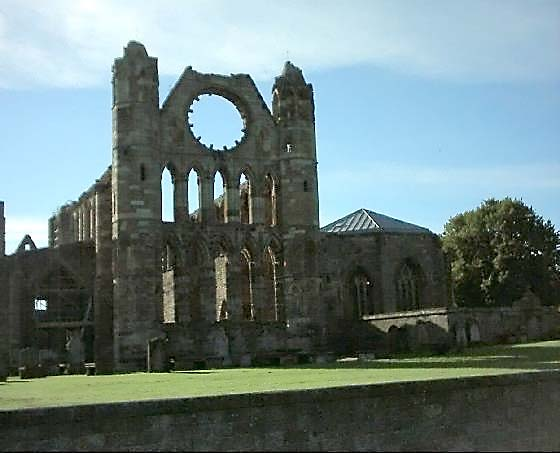
Elgin Cathedral, from the south-east. Construction of it was begun under the supervision of Bishop Andrew Moray.

The Morays of Petty also had a presence in the Scottish medieval church. A forebear of Moray the younger, also named Andrew, was bishop of Moray early in the 13th century, and an uncle, David Murray, was in the closing years of the thirteenth century a rector of Bothwell church in central Scotland and a canon of Moray. He would subsequently be consecrated in the summer of 1299 as Bishop of Moray by Pope Boniface VIII, and become a vociferous supporter of King Robert I's kingship.

== A kingdom in turmoil ==
The late 13th century was a time of upheaval in Scotland. On 19 March 1286, King Alexander III died after apparently being thrown from his horse as he made his way to Kinghorn, in Fife, from Edinburgh Castle to be with his young Flemish queen, Yolande. The Crown passed to his three-year-old granddaughter, Margaret, Maid of Norway, the children of his previous marriage to Margaret, a sister of King Edward I, having predeceased him. The child-queen was never crowned, dying in 1290 during the sea passage to Scotland.

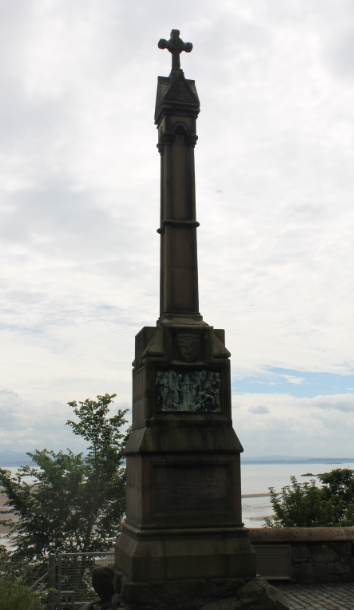
Monument to Alexander III, west of Kinghorn, by Hippolyte Blanc

Scots nobles vied for the vacant crown. The Bruces of Annandale had already unsuccessfully attempted in November 1286 to seize it in an armed coup. In this uncertain time, Scotland's leaders sought support from King Edward I of England. The price of Edward I's involvement in what became known as 'The Great Cause' was the claimants' acknowledgement of him as overlord of Scotland. Edward duly presided over a court to assess the merits of these claims. The most serious claims were advanced by John Balliol, the lord of Galloway, and Robert Bruce, lord of Annandale and grandfather of the future king. Balliol was eventually awarded the Crown, and duly swore fealty to Scotland's new English overlord, Edward I. This decision was widely accepted by the Scottish political community, including many who had previously supported Bruce.

== Invasion and defeat ==
King Edward I became a constant presence in Scottish legal and political affairs. The Scottish political community did not welcome his involvement, and by late 1295 King John had renounced his fealty to the English king and entered into a treaty with France. King Edward was reputedly enraged by such defiance, making hostilities between the kingdoms inevitable.

Andrew Moray the younger was part of the Scottish feudal host assembling at Caddonlee in March 1296 in preparation for war with England. He was likely part of his father's retinue. A part of Scottish host, led by the earls of Atholl, Ross, and Mar and John Comyn the younger of Badenoch, entered Cumberland. It marched to Carlisle, destroying, according to The St. Edmundsbury Chronicle, 120 villages. More Scots raiders crossed from Jedburgh, burning homes and farms in Northumberland. Pierre de Langtoft, an English chronicler, records:

Mar, Ross, Menteith ... have destroyed Tindale to cinders and coals, The town of Corbridge, and two monasteries, Hexham and Lanercost, they have annihilated by burning; They have made slaughter of the people of the country, Carried off the goods driven away the canons.

King Edward I assembled a large army on the Anglo-Scottish border for the invasion of Scotland. By 30 March it was besieging the prosperous Scottish port of Berwick.

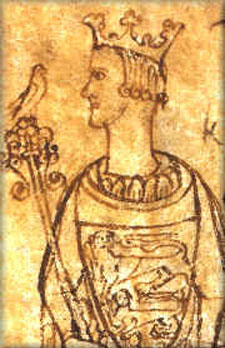
Image of King Edward from a contemporary memorandum

Berwick soon fell and was sacked by the English army. The English Lanercost Chronicle condemned this slaughter as a "crime" and recorded that fifteen thousand "of both sexes perished, some by the sword, others by fire, in the space of a day and a half".

It had been many years since Scotland had mobilized for war, and at the Battle of Dunbar the Scots were overwhelmed quickly by a detachment led by John de Warenne, Earl of Surrey. The Chronicle of Bury St. Edmunds records the death of eight thousand Scots soldiers at Dunbar.

Scotland now capitulated. Edward I deposed King John at Montrose castle. The symbols of the Scottish kingship were taken from him, including the royal coat of arms which was stripped from his surcoat (thereby earning him the enduring title Toom Tabard, 'Empty Coat'). King Edward undertook an extended march across Scotland, reaching Elgin on 26 July 1296. He remained in the town's castle for a few days, taking the fealty of a number of Scots nobles.

Scots nobles captured at Dunbar were sent to prisons across England. The most important prisoners, such as Sir Andrew Moray of Petty, were taken to the Tower of London. Sir Andrew spent the remainder of his life there, dying on 8 April 1298. Andrew Moray the younger, a prisoner of less significance, was imprisoned in Chester Castle.

== Rebellion ==
King Edward's English administration in the defeated Scottish kingdom was headed by the Earl of Surrey. Sir Hugh de Cressingham was appointed Treasurer, and Walter Amersham, Chancellor. The Justiciars for Lothian, Scotia (i.e. the territories north of the Forth), and Galloway were English appointees. Most of Scotland's former royal castles were held by English nobles.

English tax collectors began to impose heavy taxes on the Scots, corruptly exploiting the populace to enrich themselves as they collected the king's taxes. Cressingham had by the end of May 1297 dispatched £5,188 6s. 8d. to the English treasury. Edward also sought to conscript Scots, including the nobility, into the armies being raised to fight in Flanders. This plan caused widespread alarm across Scotland and further contributed to growing restlessness against English rule.

Scotland may have been easily conquered by King Edward in 1296, but outbreaks of violence soon followed against the English occupiers and their Scots allies. These are usually dated to May 1297.

"In the month of May of the same year [1297]", the Hemingsburgh Chronicle notes, "the perfidious race of Scots began to rebel."

Argyll and Ross were the scenes of earlier violence. In Argyll, Lachlann Mac Ruaidhrí and Ruaidhrí Mac Ruaidhrí were in rebellion, attacking Edward I's MacDonald supporters, killing royal officials and destroying royal property. In Galloway the rebels seized English-held castles. There was violence in Aberdeenshire and in Fife, where MacDuff of Fife and his sons led the rising. In Central Scotland, William Hesilrig, the English sheriff of Lanark, was murdered on 3 May 1297, during an attack on the town led by William Wallace and Richard Lundie. While the Scots suffered under English occupation, Andrew Moray the younger continued to be imprisoned in Chester castle, but sometime in winter 1296–97 he escaped and made his way back to his father's lands in north Scotland. He was soon a participant in the uprising against English rule. He raised his standard at Avoch in the first days of May 1297. News of Moray's actions drew supporters to him. Sir William fitz Warin, the English constable of Urquhart Castle on the shores of Loch Ness, wrote to King Edward in July 1297:

"Some evil disposed people have joined Andrew Moray at the castle of [Avoch] in Ross."

Amongst them were Alexander Pilche, a burgess from Inverness, and a number of burgesses from the town.

King Edward I ordered supporters in Argyll and Ross to assist the Sheriff of Argyll Alexander of the Isles to suppress the rebels. The English Sheriff of Aberdeen, Sir Henry de Latham, was ordered on 11 June 1297 to deal with rebels in Aberdeenshire. Men were dispatched from England, including Henry Percy and Walter Clifford, to suppress the rebellion.

== Attack on Castle Urquhart ==
In May 1297 Andrew Moray the younger was leading the rebellion in the province of Moray. King Edward's Scots lieutenant in the area was Sir Reginald Cheyne, the sheriff of Elgin. Cheyne was alarmed by the growth of Moray's rebellion, writing to the king to request assistance. In response to the king's orders to suppress the rebellion, Sir Reginald ordered his subordinates to a meeting at Inverness Castle on 25 May 1297 to discuss how to deal with Moray. One participant was Sir William fitz Warin constable of Urquhart Castle standing on the western shore of Loch Ness.

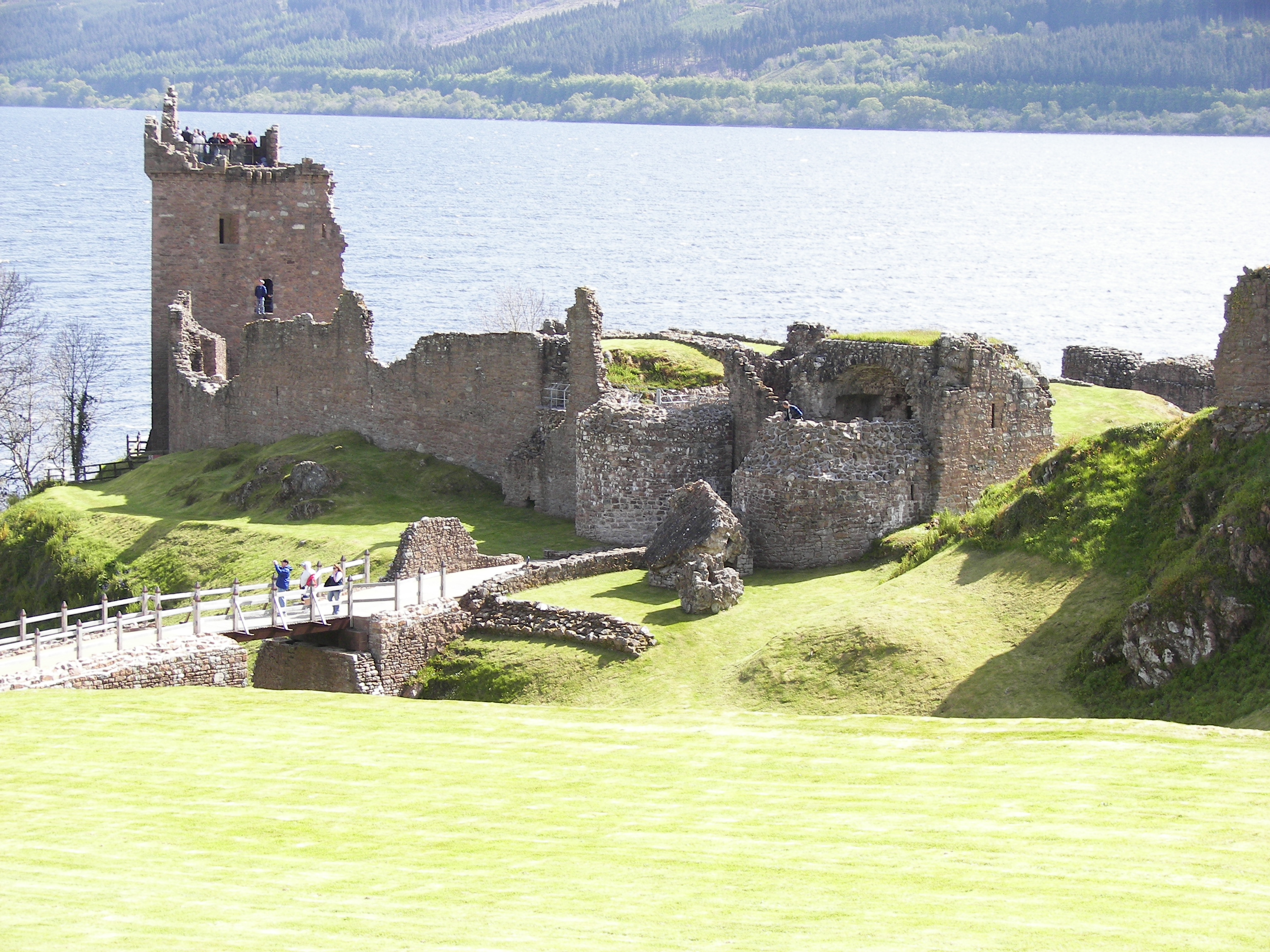
Urquhart Castle, which Andrew Moray sought to capture by night assault in late May 1297

After this meeting, Sir William fitz Warin returned to his castle accompanied by an escort of men-at-arms. A few miles south of Inverness, he was unsuccessfully ambushed by a force led by Moray and Alexander Pilche. Next day, Sir William found himself besieged in his castle by Moray. The Countess of Ross unexpectedly arrived on the scene with her retinue. The countess, whose husband was held by King Edward in the Tower of London, advised him to surrender. Moray, lacking siege strength, unsuccessfully tried to take the castle in a night attack. He left Sir William to send an account of this mêlee to his king.

== King Edward fights back ==
Although Andrew Moray the younger was thwarted at Urquhart Castle, he continued to prosecute a vigorous campaign against his enemies in the province of Moray. The devastation of Sir Reginald Cheyne's lands was later reported to King Edward

a very large body of rogues swept through the province of Moray towards the Spey, destroying the lands of Duffus, laid waste and captured the castle.

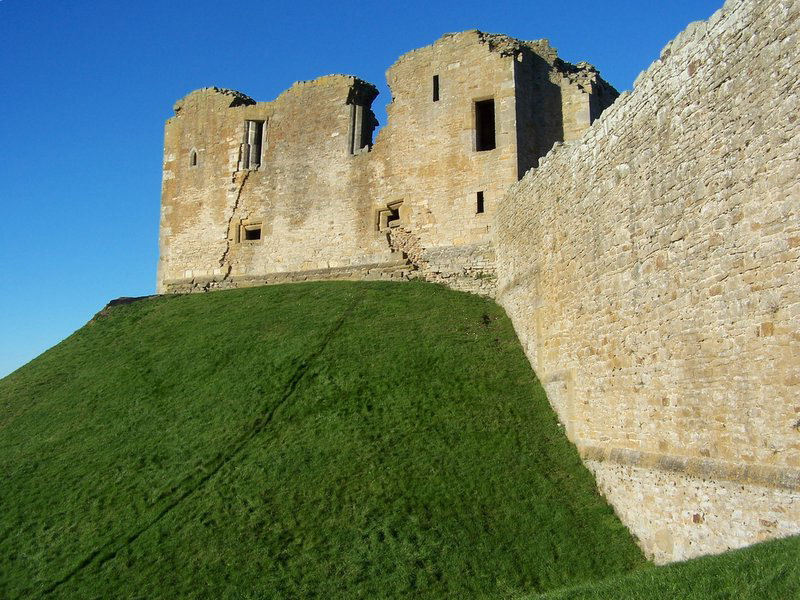
The remnant of the stone keep at Duffus Castle, built in the early 14th century to replace the earlier structure on that site burned by Andrew Moray in 1297

King Edward I while preparing to campaign in Flanders sought to deal with the threat posed by Andrew Moray by making use of Scots nobles released from his prisons. The king issued orders on 11 June 1297 to several apparently loyal Scots lords to raise their retinues and march into the province of Moray to relieve fitz Warin and restore English authority. They included Henry Cheyne, Bishop of Aberdeen, Sir Gartnait of Mar, heir to the earldom of Mar and whose father was currently held in the Tower of London, and John Comyn, Earl of Buchan and Constable of Scotland, together with his brother, Alexander. The Comyn brothers, related to Moray via his mother, were to remain in the province until the rebellion had been stamped out.

These nobles departed from Aberdeen in early July 1297, and Moray the younger met them on the banks of the River Spey at Enzie, where the road from Aberdeen to Inverness forded the waters of the river, on the eastern edge of the province of Moray.

An extremely ambiguous account of events at Enzie was sent on 25 August 1297 from Inverness to King Edward by Bishop Cheyne, It relates that after some discussion, Moray and his rebel army withdrew into

"very great stronghold of bog and wood" [where] "no horseman could be of service".

This was a highly dubious explanation when one considers the Comyn family pacified for the Scots king the province of Moray in the early 13th century. It appears more likely that neither side wished to fight men that they did not consider their enemies. But if Cheyne thought he could save face with this letter, he failed to reckon with Hugh de Cressingham. Cressingham, having seen this letter, wrote to the king on 5 August:

Sire, the peace on the other side of the Scottish Sea [the Firth of Forth] is still in obscurity, as it is said, as to the doings of the earls who are there.

Cressingham clearly did not believe that the Scots lords tasked with dealing with Moray had done their duty, believing they were playing a double game at King Edward's expense. He was especially dismissive of the account of confrontation at the Spey, writing to King Edward:

Sir Andrew de Rait is going to you with a credence, which he has shown to me, and which is false in many points ... you will give little weight to it.

While Andrew Moray seized control of north Scotland and William Wallace was active in west-central Scotland, a rising led by Scotland's traditional feudal leaders was underway in the south of the kingdom. Amongst its leaders were James, the High Steward of Scotland, Robert Wishart, Bishop of Glasgow, and Robert Bruce of Carrick, the future king. Faced with an army led by Henry de Percy and Robert de Clifford, they entered negotiations in June and capitulated at Irvine in July.

In summer 1297, King Edward proposed to release the younger Moray's father, Sir Andrew Moray of Petty, from imprisonment in the Tower to serve in the ranks of the English army in Flanders, if his son was prepared to take his father's place as a royal hostage. A safe conduct, allowing him to come to England, was issued under the king's seal on 28 August 1297. It is not known if this letter ever reached him, but if it did, it was ignored and his father remained confined in the Tower, dying there on 4 April 1298.

== Battle of Stirling Bridge ==
By late summer 1297, King Edward I had lost control of Scotland. The extent of the breakdown in his rule was described in a letter to him from Cressingham:

by far the greater part of your counties of the realm of Scotland are still unprovided with keepers, as [they have been killed or imprisoned]; and some have given up their bailiwicks, and others neither will nor dare return; and in some counties the Scots have established and placed bailiffs and ministers, so that no county is in proper order, excepting Berwick and Roxburgh, and this only lately.

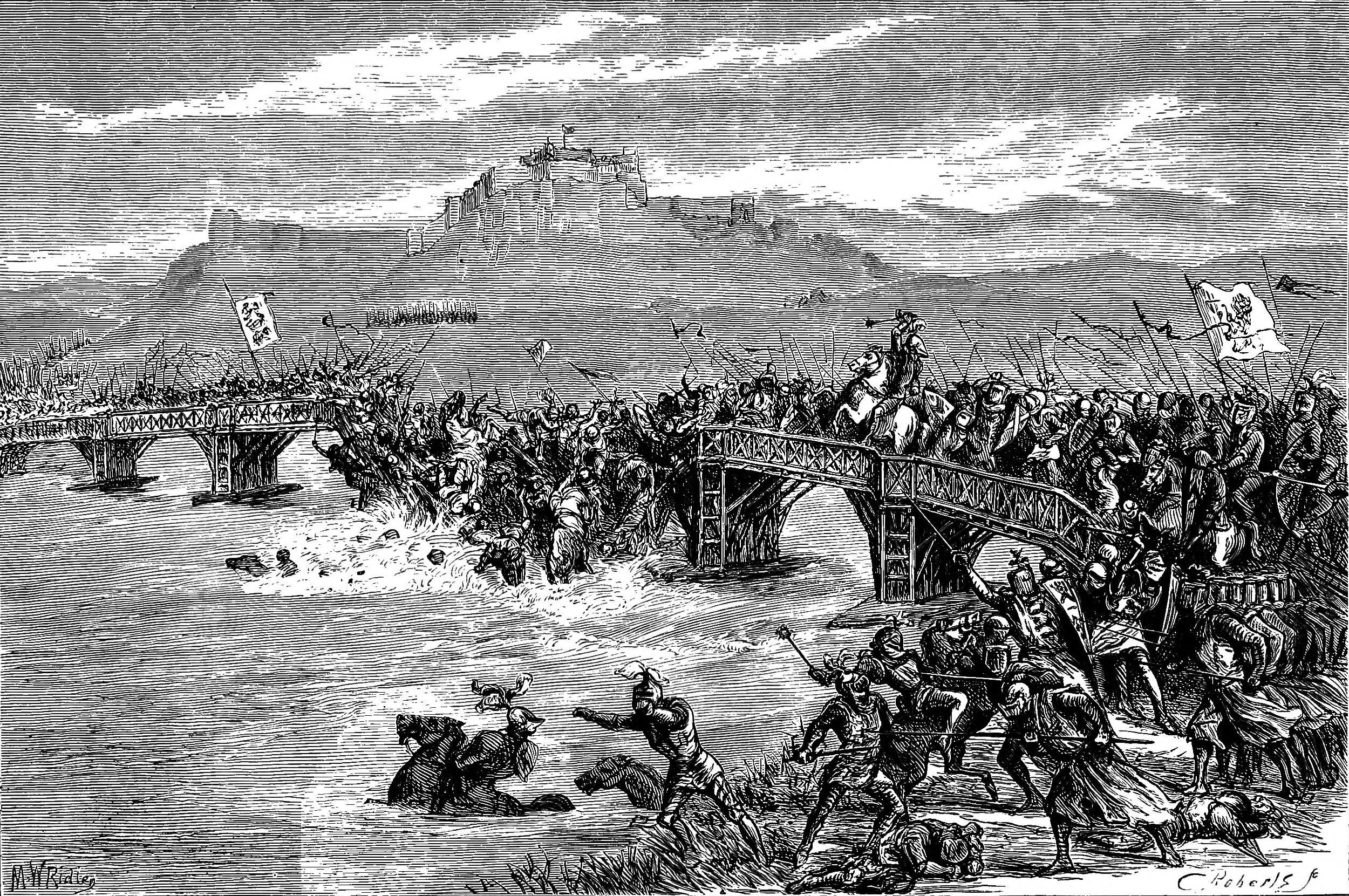
A Victorian depiction of the battle. The bridge collapse suggests that the artist has been influenced by Blind Harry's account of the battle.

Of the castles north of the River Forth, only Dundee remained in English hands.

In the late summer of 1297, the earl of Surrey finally acted against Moray and Wallace. He was subsequently vilified for this indolence. Walter of Guisborough, said of him:

The earl [of Surrey] ... to whom our king committed the care and custody of the Kingdom of Scotland, because of the awful weather, said that he could not stay there and keep his health. He stayed in England, but in the northern part and sluggishly pursued the exiling [of the] enemy, which was the root of our later difficulty.

Moray and Wallace, besieging Dundee castle, entrusted the siege to the townspeople and marched to Stirling to meet him. They deployed their men to the north of the River Forth, close to the old bridge at Stirling and Stirling Castle.

Surrey was outmanoeuvred and outfought in the ensuing battle. The key to it was the bridge over the river Forth. Walter of Guisborough said that it was

"a narrow bridge which a pair of horsemen could scarely and with difficulty cross at the same time."

Surrey deployed the vanguard of his army across it. Moray and Wallace struck when only part of the English vanguard had crossed. In the Battle of Stirling Bridge, this vanguard was destroyed. The bulk of Surrey's army, which had still not crossed the bridge, fled. Surrey led this flight. He galloped for Berwick, causing one English chronicler, Walter of Guisborough, to sneer that Surrey's "charger never once tasted food during the whole journey".

The casualties of the Scottish army, composed largely of anonymous infantry soldiers, were unrecorded. But there was one recorded casualty: Andrew Moray the younger.

Walter of Guisborough stated that Surrey lost one hundred knights and five thousand infantrymen at Stirling. This is likely an over estimate. The most notable death was Hugh Cressingham. According to the chronicle of Pierre de Langtoft Cressingham, unaccustomed

"to the saddle, From his steed in its course fell under foot, His body was cut to pieces by the ribalds of Scotland".

The Lanercost Chronicle claims that Wallace had:

"a broad strip [of Cressingham’s skin] ... taken from the head to the heel, to make therewith a baldrick for his sword".

The defeat of Surrey at the Battle of Stirling Bridge was the zenith of Moray the younger's military career. He was no skilled soldier by accident. The training for knighthood that he had received as a baron's son equipped him with the skills to fulfil a leadership role in Scotland's feudal host.

== Death ==
There is seemingly contradictory evidence about the death of Andrew Moray the younger. Two letters, issued in autumn 1297, appear to indicate he survived for some months after the fighting at Stirling Bridge. The first was sent from Haddington on 11 October 1297 to the mayors of Lübeck and Hamburg, two of the leading towns of the Hanseatic League. It was issued by:

"Andrew de Moray and William Wallace, leaders of the kingdom of Scotland and the community of the realm."

The second was issued just under a month later, on 7 November, during a Scottish raid on the northern counties of England. It was received by the prior of Hexham by:

"Andrew de Moray and William Wallace, the leaders of the army and of the realm of Scotland."

Moray's name does not appear on any later document.

The inclusion of Moray the younger's name in these letters is apparently contradicted by a formal inquisition into the affairs of his recently deceased uncle, Sir William Moray of Bothwell. It was held in Berwick-upon-Tweed in November 1300 and determined that Moray the younger was: "slain at Stirling against the king." In apparent support of this, no chronicle source places Moray at Hexham or ascribes to him any role in this raid, which Walter Guisborough's chronicle says was led by Wallace. The letters issued to the mayors of Lübeck and Hamburg, and to the prior of Hexham, may, for reasons now unknown and unclear to us, have been issued in Moray's name but also in his absence.

In response to these apparently conflicting facts, most historians choose to believe that Moray the younger was wounded at Stirling Bridge, later dying of his injuries sometime around November 1297.

== Legacy ==
Andrew Moray the younger's early death meant that his achievements have not been properly recognised. There are neither statues nor monuments to him. Moray's deeds are invariably obscured by the greater fame of William Wallace, much of which may be traced to the oft dubious content of a 11,000-line biographical poem, The Acts and Deeds of the Illustrious and Valiant Champion Sir William Wallace. This was written in the late 15th century reputedly by Scots poet Blind Harry. Nevertheless, in the late 20th century, there was increased recognition of the importance of Moray's role in the events of 1297. One historian recently described his actions as "the greatest threat to the English government".

One legacy that is not in doubt is the birth of his son. At Pentecost (25 May) 1298, Andrew Moray's widow bore him a son, also named Andrew. The child eventually acceded to the lordships of Avoch, Boharm, Petty and Bothwell, uniting the north and south branches of the family. He would play a major role in leading the resistance to the attempts of King Edward III of England, grandson of his father's foe, Edward I, to conquer Scotland in the 1330s. He was twice appointed Guardian of the Realm during the minority of King David II, the heir of Robert I.

Moray the younger's lack of recognition is increasingly a subject of debate, and has even been discussed in the Scotland's parliament. In December 2009, Murdo Fraser, a Conservative List MSP for Mid Scotland and Fife, called for a national debate on an appropriate monument to Moray, raising awareness of his historical role.

== See also ==
- Bothwell Castle
- Clan Murray
- Duffus Castle
- History of Scotland
- Kildrummy Castle
- Robert Wishart
