= William FitzWarin =

English soldier

- Arms of William FitzWarin. Quarterly by fess indented argent and sable.
- Died: 1299
- Resting place: Greyfriars, London
- Spouse(s): Maria de Ergadia, daughter of Eóghan of Argyll

Sir William FitzWarin (died c. 1299) was an English soldier active during the First War of Scottish Independence. He was the constable of Urquhart Castle (1296-1297) and after the English defeat at the Battle of Stirling Bridge on 11 September 1297, he was appointed constable of Stirling Castle, which he later surrendered and was imprisoned in Dumbarton Castle.

== Life ==
FitzWarin was made constable of Urquhart Castle following the English invasion of Scotland in 1296. Alarmed at the rebellion led by Andrew Moray, the English appointed sheriff of Inverness, Reginald le Chen ordered his principal lieutenants, including FitzWarin to a meeting at Inverness Castle on 25 May 1297 to discuss how to deal with Andrew Moray. After the meeting FitzWarin returned to Urquhart Castle accompanied by his escort of men-at-arms. A few miles south of Inverness, his party was ambushed by a force led by Andrew Moray and Alexander Pilche. With the loss of a number of men and horses, FitWarin was fortunate to escape with his life to the safety of Urquhart Castle. The next day the castle was besieged by Moray, who demanded its surrender.

Euphemia, the Countess of Ross unexpectedly arrived on the scene with her retinue. The countess, whose husband was held by King Edward I of England in the Tower of London, advised Moray to surrender. Moray refused, however she did not move against Moray. Although her advice was ignored, her actions were later commended to the king by FitzWarin. Moray, with no heavy siege equipment available to him, tried to take the castle in a night attack and having failed, was forced to abandon the siege. He left FitzWarin in possession of the castle. Following the siege, FitzWarin wrote to King Edward in July 1297: "Some evil disposed people have joined Andrew Moray at the castle of Avoch in Ross." Urquhart Castle was again besieged by Andrew Moray and with little supplies the castle garrison was eventually starved into submission.

Present at the Battle of Stirling Bridge on 11 September 1297, he survived the defeat of the English army at the hands of the Scots under William Wallace. He was appointed, by John de Warenne, 6th Earl of Surrey the leader of the English army, to the constabulary of Stirling Castle, with Marmaduke Thweng as his deputy, following the rout of the English army. FitzWarin, with Marmaduke Thweng surrendered Stirling Castle and were committed as prisoners to Dumbarton Castle. FitzWarin was later exchanged for Henry St Clair, Baron of Roslin in a prisoner exchange.

FitzWarin died some point around 1299.

== Family ==
William FitzWarin married Maria de Ergadia (d. 1302), daughter of Eóghan of Argyll. She had previously been the wife of Magnús Óláfsson, King of Mann and the Isles (d. 1265), Maol Íosa II, Earl of Strathearn (d. 1271), and Hugh, Lord of Abernethy (d. 1291/2).

William is known to have had the following issue:

- Robert, (died 1297) - Killed during the siege of Urquhart Castle.
- John, (died c. 1297)

William FitzWarin and his wife Maria de Ergadia were buried at Greyfriars, London.
