= David Chalmers, Lord Ormond =

16th-century Scottish landowner

David Chalmers, Lord Ormond (c. 1530 – 1592) was a 16th-century Scottish landowner, historian, judge, and Senator of the College of Justice. His name also appears as David Chambre and David Chambers and is title occasionally appears as Lord Ormand. He was a major figure in Edinburgh law and politics. His most notable contribution in history is as one of those accused of the murder of Lord Darnley and one of the persons organising the escape of Mary Queen of Scots from Lochleven Castle.

Born pre-Reformation, he appears to have retained strong Catholic allegiance through turbulent times.

== Life ==
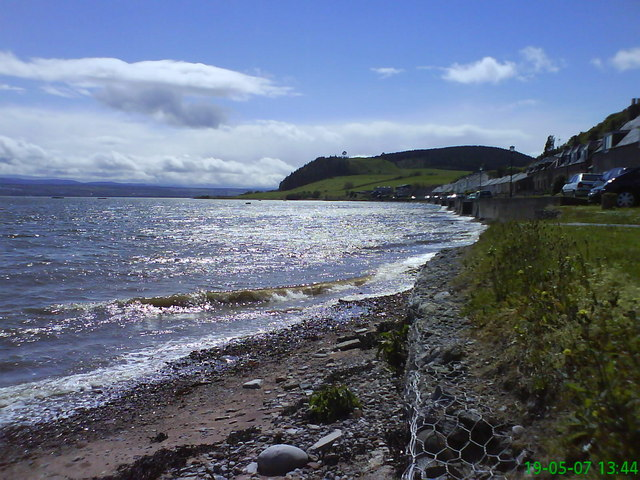
Avoch shoreline looking towards Ormond Hill

He was born in Ross-shire around 1530 the son of Andrew Chalmers, descended from the Chalmers of Strichen. He studied divinity at Aberdeen University then studied both Canon Law and Civil Law in France and Italy. The latter study was at the University of Bologna under Marianus Sozenus in 1556.

He returned to Ross-shire around 1557 and was successively parson of Suddie, Provost of Crichton, and Chancellor of the Diocese of Ross. In these roles (from around 1560) he resided at Ormond Castle on Ormond Hill. The castle (now gone) would have formed a distinctive profile as seen from the coastal village of Avoch which also fell under his control. Given the position of the castle and village it is likely that all travel to Edinburgh etc. was undertaken by ship.

In January 1565 he replaced Henry Sinclair, Bishop of Ross as a Senator of the College of Justice, adopting the title Lord Ormond.

In December 1566 Mary Queen of Scots granted him lands at Castleton in recognition of his services to Scotland both within the country and on the continent. He appears to have been a friend and confidant of the Queen. In February 1567 he was named in a placard nailed to Edinburgh Tolbooth next to St Giles Cathedral as one of the conspirators in the murder of Henry Stuart, Lord Darnley and his valet, William Taylor. As Chalmers house adjoined Kirk o'Field, the site of the murder, it is likely that at the very least he was a witness to the event. The placard also accused the Earl of Bothwell, James Balfour of Flisk (near Cupar), and "black" John Spens, Lord Condie.

In May 1568 he was involved in helping Mary Queen of Scots escape from Lochleven Castle and fought for her at the Battle of Langside, alongside numerous Scottish noblemen. For these actions the Scottish parliament exiled him, and he was forced to leave Scotland for several years.

In exile from the summer of 1568 he first lived and associated with the court of Philip II in Spain then in France in the court of Charles IX. Ormond Castle and his adjacent estates at Suddie and Avoch were sold to Andrew Munro of Milntown late in 1568.

Chalmers received a pension from Mary's French council and also worked for Francis Walsingham. In May 1584 the Scottish parliament lifted his ban and allowed his return to Scotland after almost 16 years absence. In 1586 he was restored to the bench and permitted to resume his role as a judge.

He died in Edinburgh in November 1592. There is no clear record of his exact burial place but he appears to be buried in Greyfriars Kirkyard.

== Publications ==
- "Notes of the Scottish Parliament" (1561) aka "The Black Acts"
- Histoire abbregée; La Recherche de singularitez; Discours de la legitime sucession des femmes (1579).

== Family ==
Not known.
