= Achnahannet, Loch Ness =

Coordinates: 57.301111°N 4.470278°W

Achnahannet: Scottish Gaelic: Achadh na h-Annaid
- Location within the Inverness area
- Council area: Highland
- Lieutenancy area: Inverness
- Country: Scotland
- Sovereign state: United Kingdom
- Police: Scotland
- Fire: Scottish
- Ambulance: Scottish

Achnahannet (Scottish Gaelic: Achadh na h-Annaid) is a small hamlet and farm estate located near the northwest shore of Loch Ness in Inverness-shire, Highland, Scotland. It lies south of Drumnadrochit along the A82 road, just southwest of Lenie and Urquhart Castle.
