= Achnahannet, Strathspey =

Coordinates: 57.32397°N 3.70035°W

Achnahannet: Scottish Gaelic: Achadh na h-Annaid
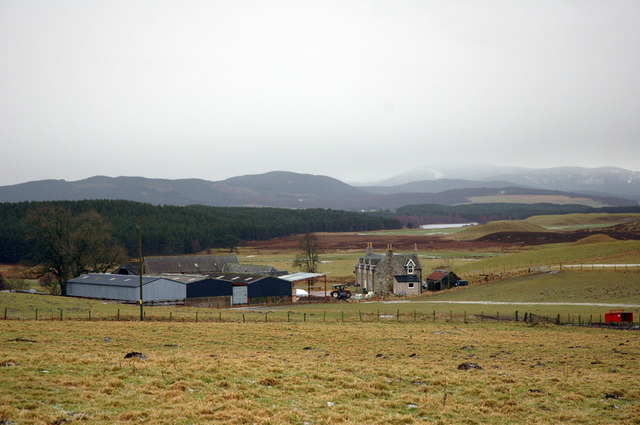

- Location within the Badenoch and Strathspey area
- OS grid reference: NH977272
- Council area: Highland
- Country: Scotland
- Sovereign state: United Kingdom
- Postcode district: PH26 3
- Police: Scotland
- Fire: Scottish
- Ambulance: Scottish
- UK Parliament: Moray West, Nairn and Strathspey
- Scottish Parliament: Skye, Lochaber and Badenoch

Achnahannet (Scottish Gaelic: Achadh na h-Annaid) is a hamlet located northwest of Dulnain Bridge, and three and a half miles west-south-west of Grantown-on-Spey, in the historical county of Morayshire, now in the Highland Council area, Scotland. Historically it belonged to the parish of Cromdale.

The name, recorded as Auchnahannatt in 1589, means 'field of the mother church', from the Gaelic words achadh 'field' na h- 'of the' and annaid 'mother church, early church. An old chapel and a well named Tobar an Domhnaich is located nearby.

== Geography ==
Achnahannet Burn flows in the area; it is a tributary of the River Dulnain. The land westward from Achnahannet to Lynmore contains a belt of morainic sands and gravels between the River Dulnain terraces.

== Notable people ==
- Colonel George Grant Gordon.
