= Avoch =

Village in Highland Scotland

Coordinates: 57.569327°N 4.175335°W

Avoch: Scottish Gaelic: Abhach
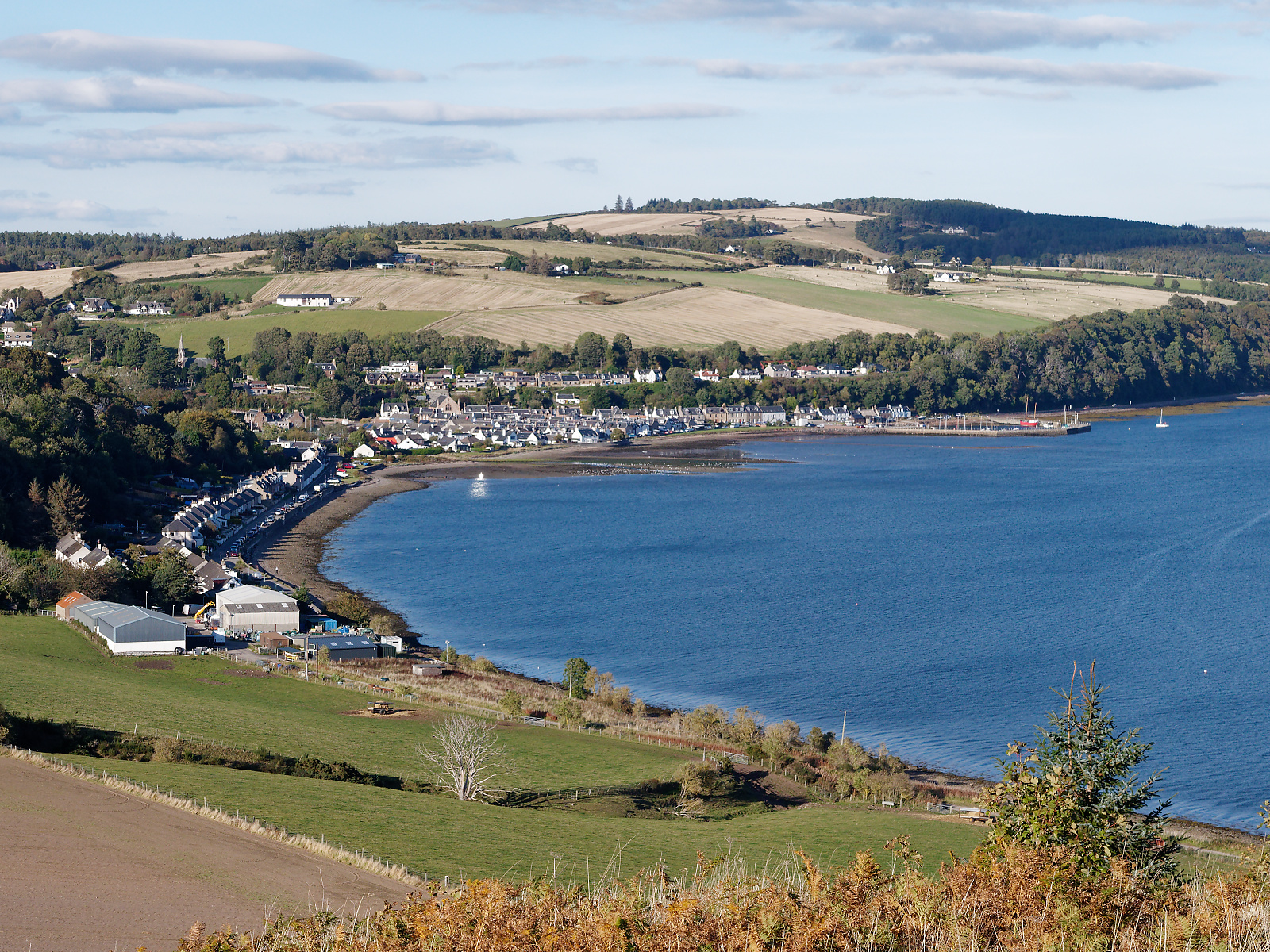
- Avoch viewed from Ormond Hill

- Location within the Highland council area
- Population: 1,000 (2020)
- OS grid reference: NH699553
  - Edinburgh: 118 mi (190 km)
  - London: 449 mi (723 km)
- Council area: Highland
- Country: Scotland
- Sovereign state: United Kingdom
- Post town: AVOCH
- Postcode district: IV9
- Dialling code: 01381
- Police: Scotland
- Fire: Scottish
- Ambulance: Scottish
- UK Parliament: Caithness, Sutherland and Easter Ross
- Scottish Parliament: Skye, Lochaber and Badenoch

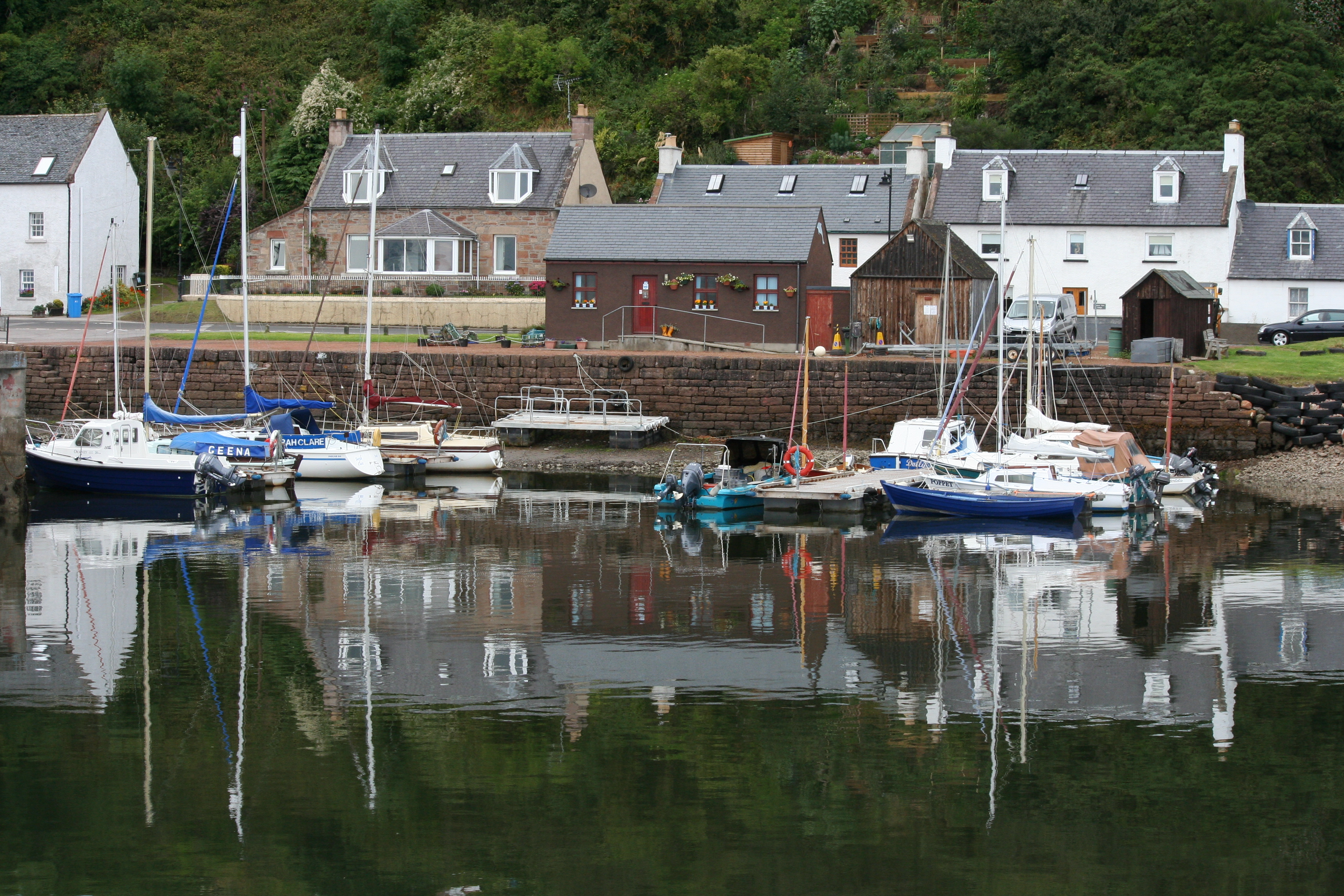
Avoch harbour

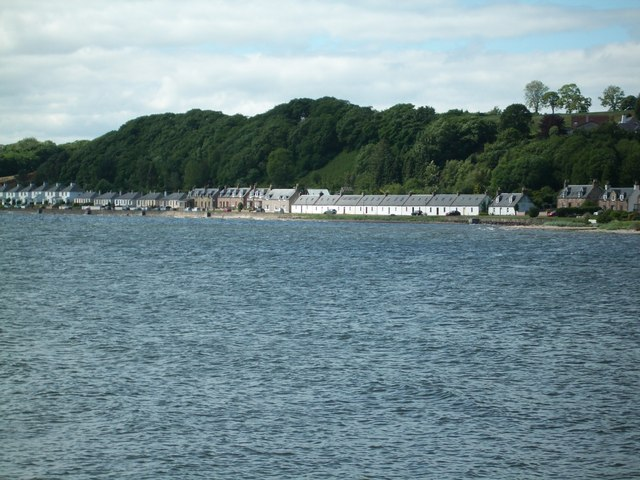
Looking back east to Avoch from the harbour

Avoch (/ˈɒx/ OKH; from the Scottish Gaelic: Abhach – meaning mouth of the stream) is a harbour-village located on the south-east coast of the Black Isle, on the Moray Firth.

== History ==
=== Origins ===
Ormond Castle or Avoch Castle was a stronghold built on the site and served as a royal castle to William the Lion; passed on to the Morays of Petty then Archibald the Grim, Lord of Galloway, upon his marriage to Joanna de Moravia in 1362. Descendants of Archibald, were to take the title of Earl of Ormonde from the castle. Legend has it that the village was founded by survivors of the Spanish Armada in 1588.

=== Estate owners ===
==== Pittonachy, Rosehaugh and Scatwell ====
Avoch was in the control of David Chalmers, Lord Ormond from 1560/61 but he forfeited his castle and control of Avoch in 1568 when he was exiled due to his part in assisting the escape of Mary Queen of Scots. The castle and village then passed to Andrew Munro of Milntown. In the late 16th century the Munro of Pittonachy family held the estate of Pittonachy in the parish until Hugh Munro, III of Pittonachy (d.1670) sold it. It then became a property of the Mackenzies who renamed it Rosehaugh. George Mackenzie of Rosehaugh was the first of his family to hold the estate. He was succeeded by his son, also called George Mackenzie, who left an only daughter who died without issue and thus the Mackenzie of Rosehaugh branch became extinct in the male line. In 1688, the estate was purchased from Mackenzie of Rosehaugh by Sir Kenneth Mackenzie, IV of Scatwell, a family originally from the parish of Contin. Kenneth's son, Roderick Mackenzie, built a new mansion called Rosehaugh House, although in Alexander Mackenzie's 19th century history it was still referred to by the old Munro name of "Pittonachty" (Pittonachy). This mansion was demolished in 1959.

Mackenzie of Scatwell who owned the estate during the Jacobite rising of 1745 refused to raise his men for the Jacobite cause despite being threatened with military execution by the Jacobite George Mackenzie, 3rd Earl of Cromartie. Scatwell was apparently happy that Cromartie therefore did not return from his expedition to Sutherland.

==== Royston ====
The other estate in the parish of Avoch was the Royston Estate which was owned by James Mackenzie, Lord Royston (died 1744) who was the fourth son of George Mackenzie, 1st Earl of Cromartie (died 1714). James Mackenzie, Lord Royston married Elizabeth, daughter of Sir George Mackenzie of Rosehaugh but their only son, George, predeceased him. When James Mackenzie, Lord Royston died in 1744 he was survived by two daughters, Anne who married but without issue and Elizabeth who married Sir John Stewart of Grandtully with issue. According to contemporary documents, the Royston estate rental records of Avoch, in 1747 the estate was then held by Lord Royston's grandson, John Stewart. In 1826, the dormant male Baronetcy of Royston was assumed by a descendant of the Mackenzies of Cromarty and Tarbat, Lieutenant-Colonel Alexander Mackenzie. He died in 1841 without issue and so was succeeded by his younger brother, Sir James Sutherland Mackenzie, who also died unmarried in 1858 and the Baronetcy of Royston became dormant again. Upon his death the baronetcy should have gone to his cousin John Mackenzie, but he did not assume the title.

=== Sir Alexander Mackenzie ===
Intrepid Scottish explorer in Canada Sir Alexander Mackenzie, the first European to explore the great Canadian river now known as the Mackenzie River, crossing North America twice, to the Arctic Ocean in 1789 and Pacific Ocean in 1793, retired to Avoch in 1812 where he died in 1820 and was buried in the old Avoch Parish churchyard.

=== Fishing ===
The Annual Reports of the Fishery Board for Scotland provide an insight into the state of fishing from Avoch in the years before the First World War.

Fishery Statistics

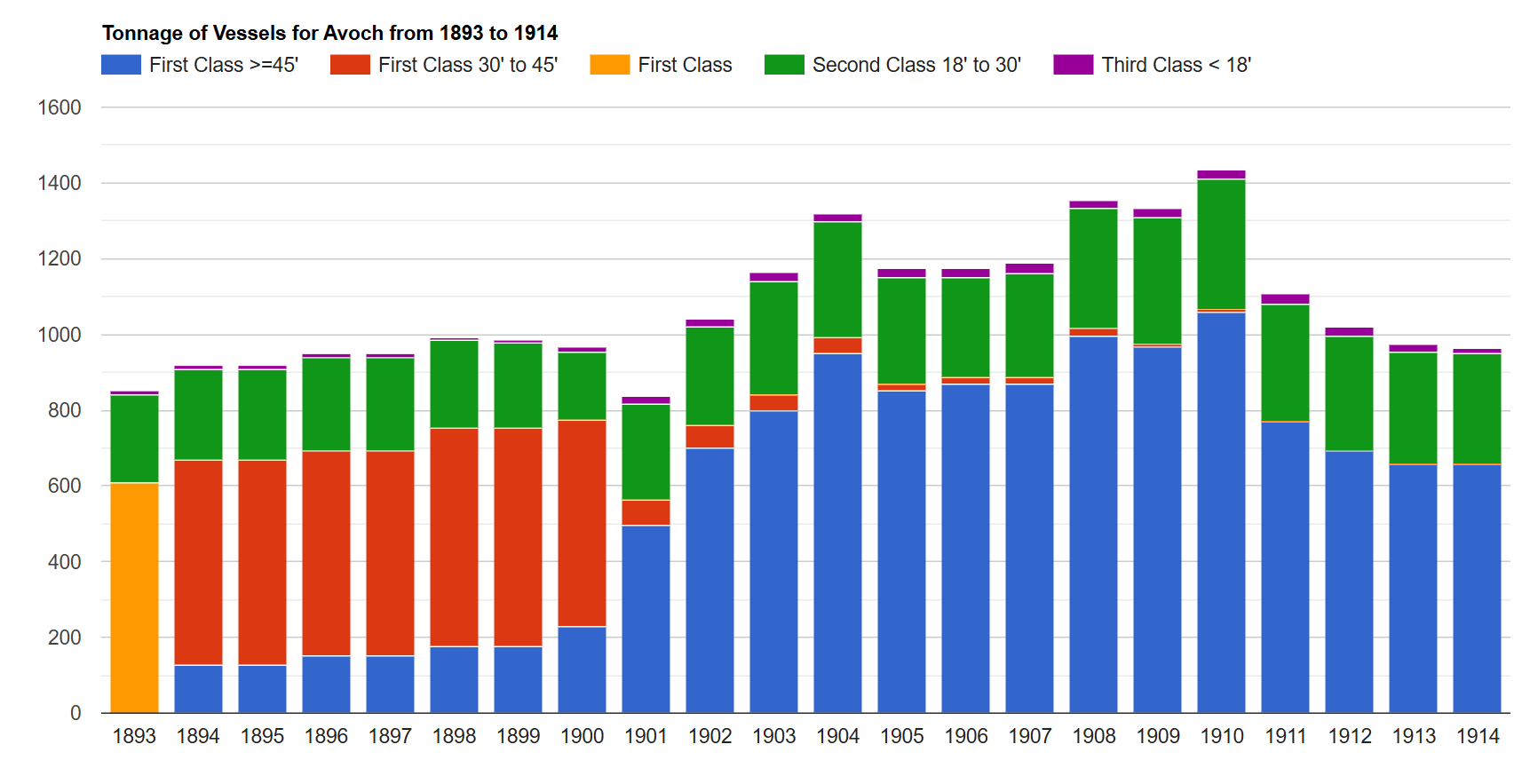
Tonnage of vessels

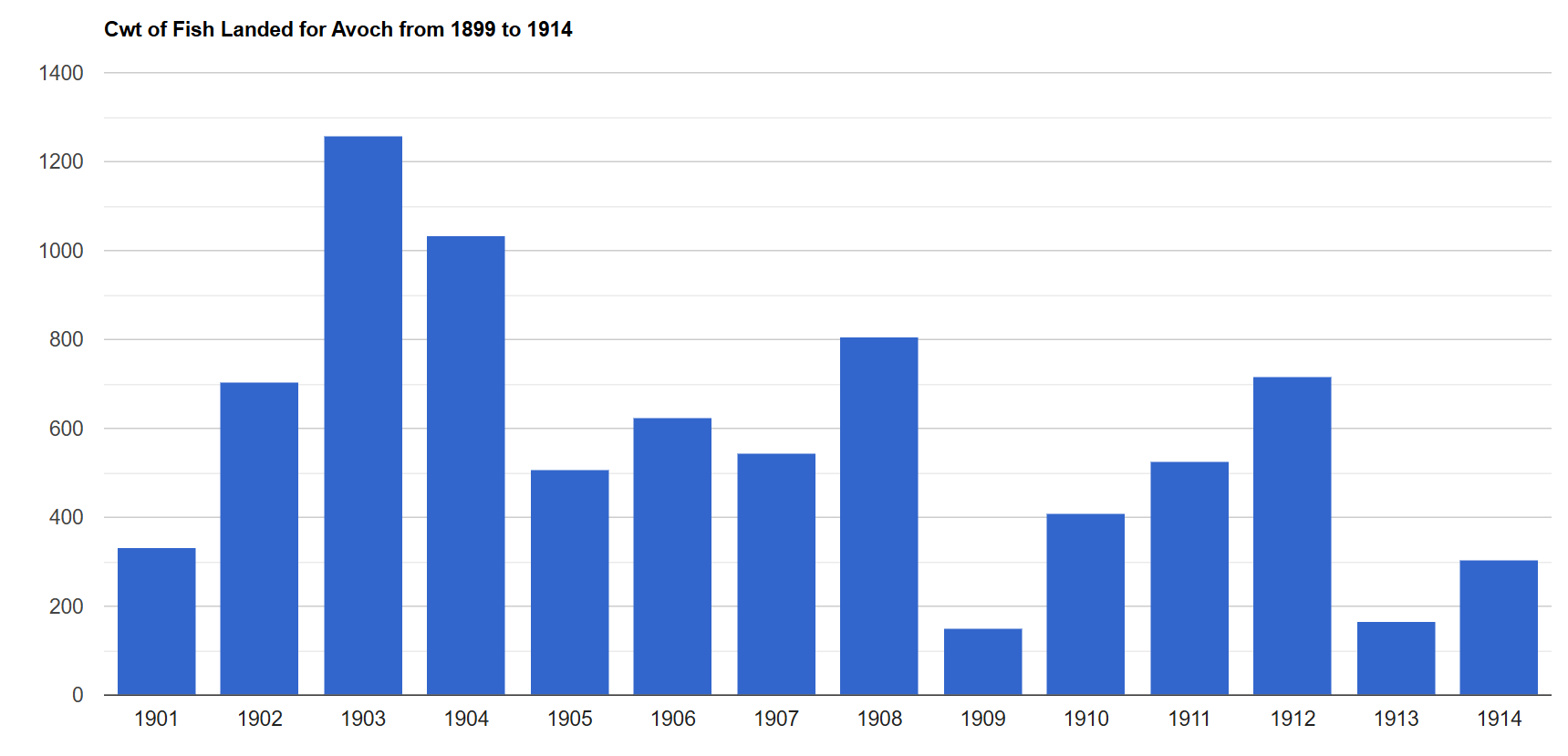
Cwt of fish landed

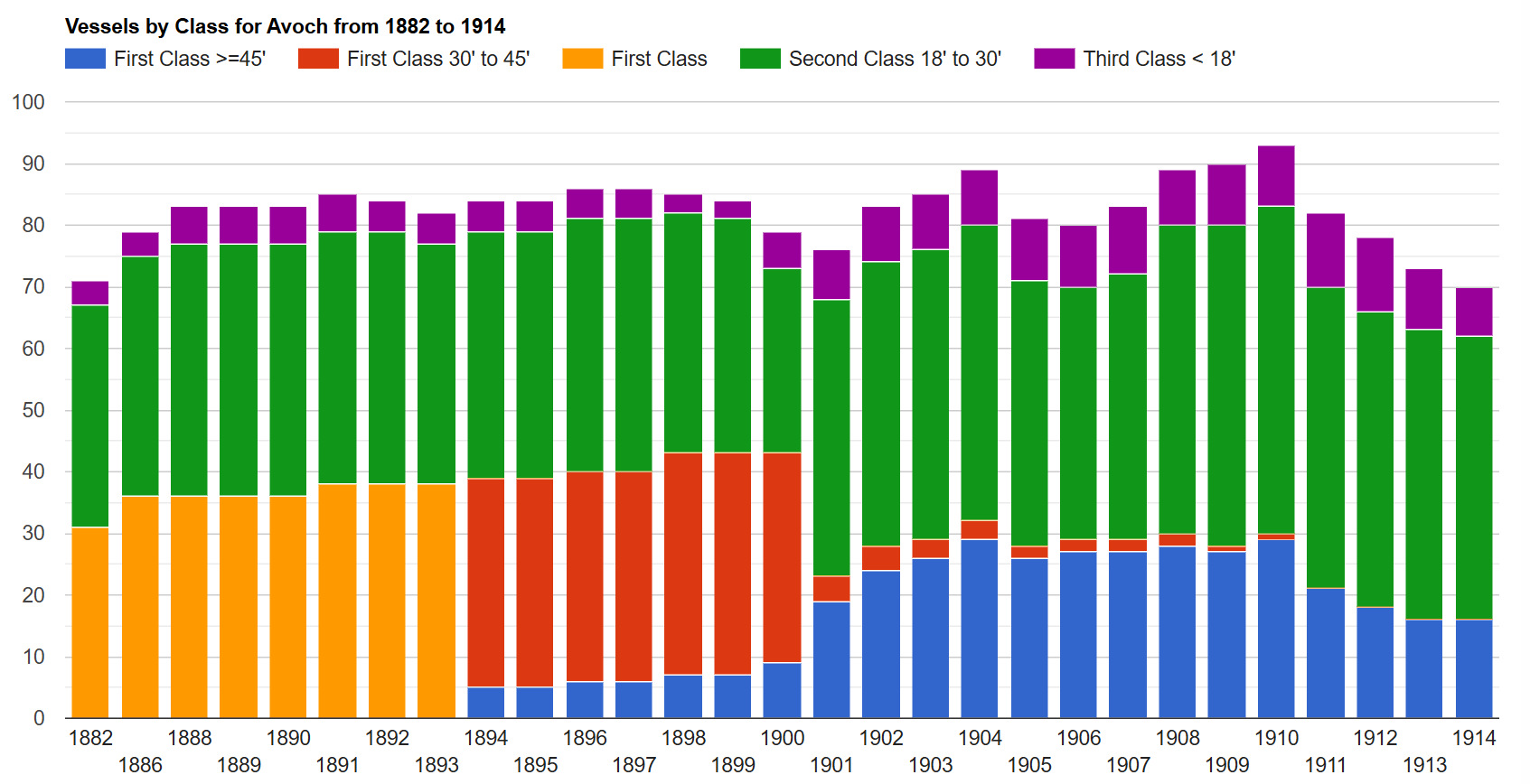
Vessels by class

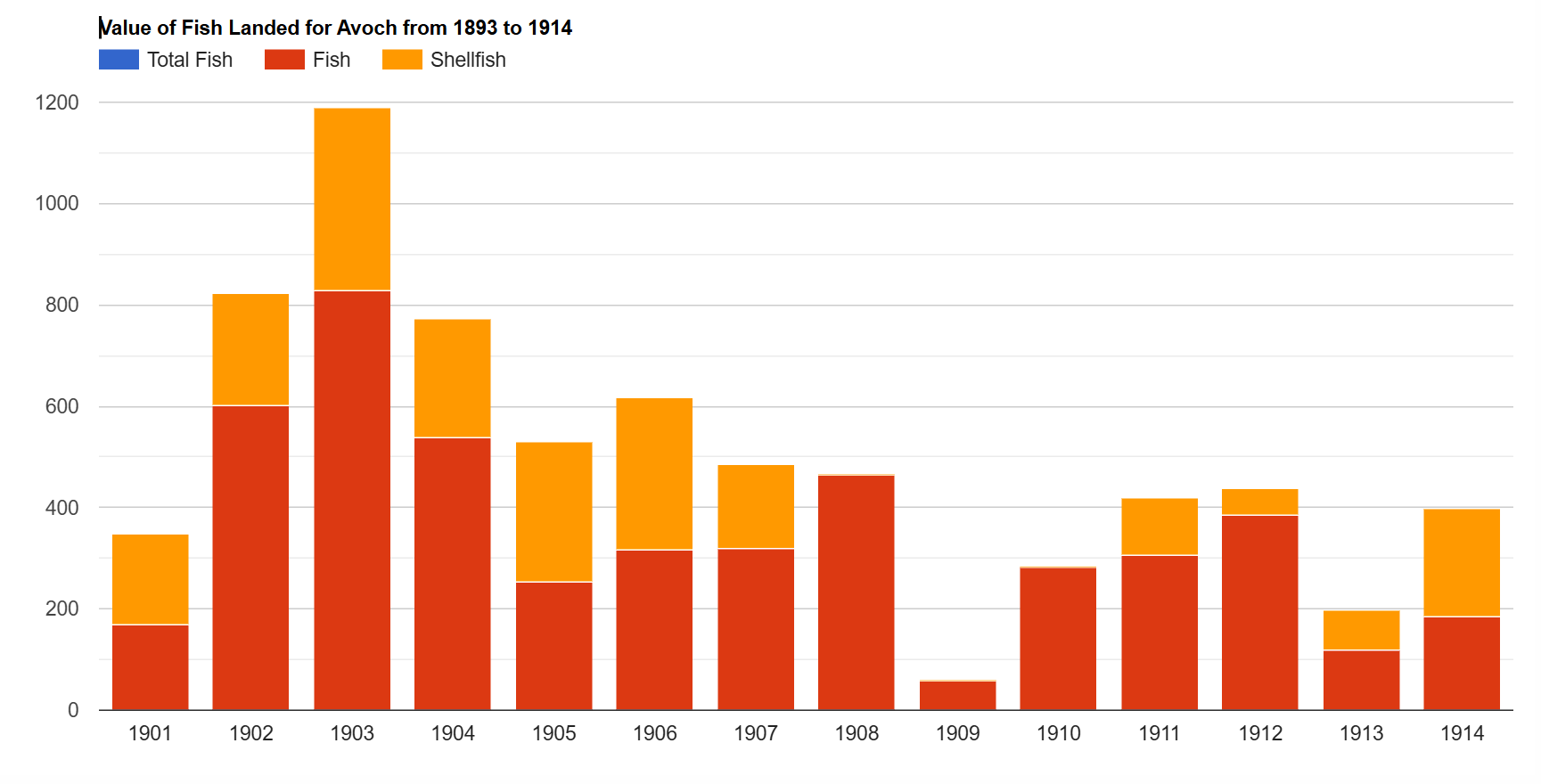
Value (£) of fish landed

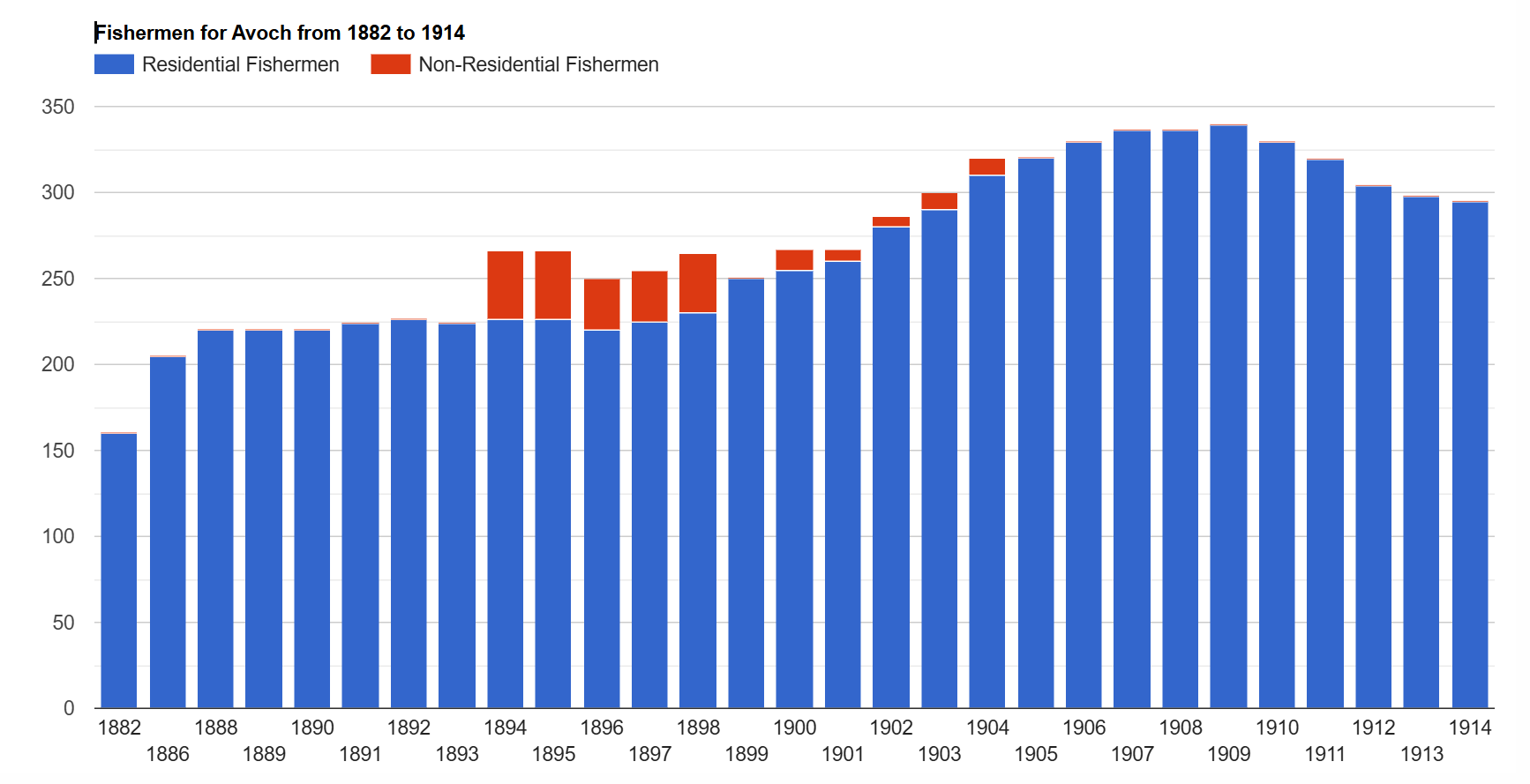
Fishermen

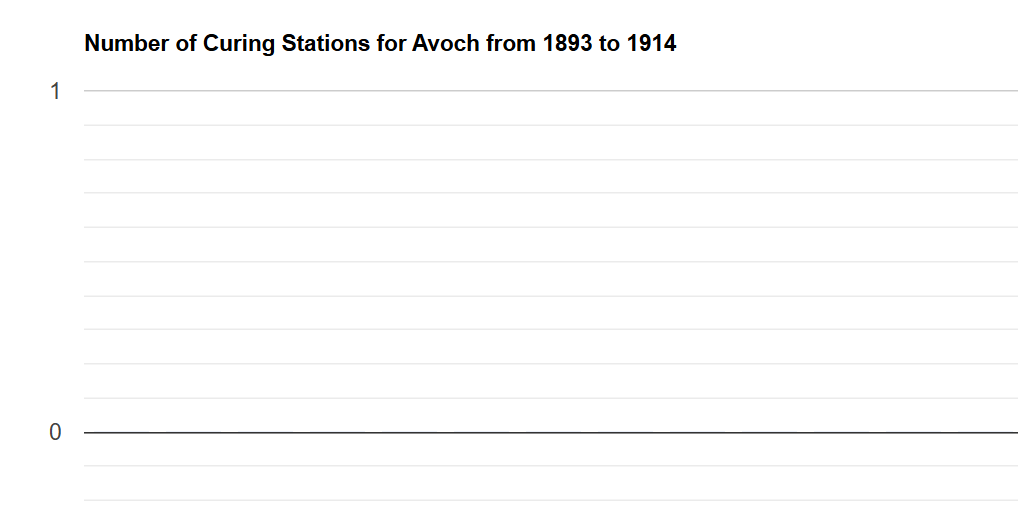
Placeholder - no curing stations

The report for 1908 states that the "majority of men [are] absent from April till September at [the] herring fishing." The principal kinds of fish landed in Avoch were codlings, haddocks and flounders.

== Industry ==
Much of Avoch's wealth has come from its fishing industry, and it remains a significant contributor to the village economy, with several large fishing boats owned or crewed from Avoch and an active fishermen's co-operative based there. The harbour is no longer used by the larger boats for landing but is used by leisure craft and boats taking visitors to see the dolphins in the inner Moray Firth at Chanonry Point. In addition to the fishing industry, commuting to Inverness and tourism provide income to the village. Lazy Corner, named for the youngsters who gathered there to pass the time, has been moved by the road widening in the Eighties, and spruced up by a sculpture intended to add character to the village. It is still a gathering place.

== See also ==
- Clootie well
- Rosehaugh House
