= Ormond Castle =

Castle in Scotland, United Kingdom

Coordinates: 57°33′13″N 4°10′48″W

- near Avoch, Highland, Scotland
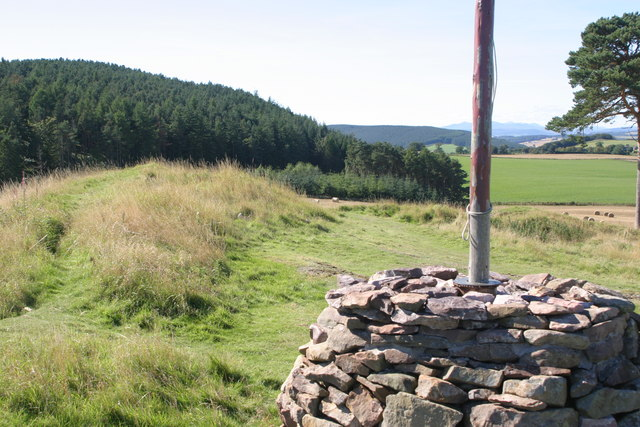
- Ormond Hill where Ormond Castle once stood

Site information
- Condition: Ruined

Location
- Location in Highland, Scotland
- Location within Highland

Site history
- Built: c. 13th century
- Materials

Ormond Castle, also known as Avoch Castle, was a powerful stronghold, overlooking the village of Avoch, on the Black Isle, in the former county of Ross and Cromarty, now part of Highland, Scotland. It controlled a prominent position overlooking the Moray Firth and critical to the sea access to Inverness.

== Origins ==
The castle dates from the late 12th century and was rebuilt as a strong rectangular fortress with square corner towers (in the Norman style) between 1200 and 1214 by William the Lion as a royal fortress.

== De Moravia ==
By the thirteenth century, the castle was in the hands of the de Moravias of Petty and was where they ruled their vast tracts of land across Moray. Andrew de Moravia mustered the men of Moray to join King John Balliol at Ormond Castle following his dishonour in front of Edward I of England, at the outset of Wars of Scottish Independence.

Sir Andrew Murray died here in 1338.

== Douglas ==
The heiress to the de Moravias of Petty was Joanna of Bothwell, in 1362 she married Archibald the Grim, Lord of Galloway and later 3rd Earl of Douglas who claimed her estates and titles de jure uxoris (by right of marriage). Ormond Castle was the caput of the Barony of Ormonde, and was created into an Earldom in 1445 for Hugh Douglas, Earl of Ormonde, third son of James Douglas, 7th Earl of Douglas. Following the fall of the Black Douglases after the Battle of Arkinholm in 1455 and the execution of the earl, his properties, like those of his brothers, was forfeit. Ormond Castle was taken by the crown and regranted to George Douglas, 4th Earl of Angus. Angus, the "Red Douglas", was a kinsman and enemy of the Black Douglases, and became the new power from that mighty house. The title of Earl of Ormonde was recreated for the elder son of the 1st Marquess of Douglas in 1651, but became extinct upon the death of Archibald Douglas, 3rd Earl of Ormonde in 1715, who died of wounds following the Battle of Sheriffmuir.

== Munro ==
From 1560 to 1568 the castle was owned by David Chalmers, Lord Ormond, but his support of Mary Queen of Scots forced him into exile in 1568 and he was forced to sell the castle and the adjacent estates of Suddie and Avoch.

In 1568 Ormond Castle and the lands of Suddie in Avoch were acquired under feu from the Earls of Angus and Ormonde, by Andrew Munro, 5th of Milntown, also known as Andrew Munro of Newmore during his father's lifetime.

== Cromwell ==
Ormond Castle was destroyed in the 1650s by Oliver Cromwell, in order for him to build his fortress at Inverness. Only ruins of the castle remain today.

== See also ==
- Earl of Ormonde
