= Walter de Moravia =

13th-century Scottish noble

- Lord of Duffus and Strathbrock
- Died: c. 1263
- Noble family: de Moravia family
- Father: Hugh de Moravia

For Walter de Moravia, contemporary Lord of Petty, Bracholy, Boharm, Arteldol and Bothwell, and Justiciar of Lothian see Walter de Moray.

Walter de Moravia (Note: Also known as Walter de Duffus) (died c. 1263), Lord of Duffus, and Strathbrock, was a Scottish noble.

He was a younger son of Hugh de Moravia. His grandfather William had obtained a grant from King William I of Scotland, of the lands of Strathbrock in West Lothian, as well as Duffus in Moray, between 1165 and 1171. Walter inherited these lands upon the death of his father.

Walter married Euphemia, daughter of Fearchar, Earl of Ross. He was succeeded by his son Freskin.
