= William de Moravia of Petty =

12th-13th century Scottish noble

William II de Moravia
- Lord of Petty, Bracholy, Boharm and Arteldol
- Died: c. 1226
- Noble family: de Moravia family
- Father: William, son of Freskin

William II de Moravia (died c. 1226), Lord of Petty, Bracholy, Boharm and Arteldol, was a Scottish noble.

He was the second son of William, son of Freskin. His elder brother was Hugh de Moravia of Duffus and Strathbrock. William gifted the church of Artendol to the Cathedrals of Spynie and Elgin. He was appointed as Sheriff of Inverness and Nairn in 1204. William built the chapel of Galival, near Gauldwell Castle prior to 1222. He died before October 1226.

== Marriage and issue ==
William, married a daughter of David de Olifard, they are known to have had the following issue:

- Walter de Moray (died c. 1278), married a daughter of Máel Coluim II, Earl of Fife, had issue.
- William III de Moravia, Canon of Moray.
