= Andrew Moray (justiciar) =

Scottish noble

Sir Andrew Moray
- Lord of Petty, Bracholy, Boharm and Arteldol; Justiciar of Scotland
- Died: 8 April 1298
- Noble family: de Moray family
- Spouses: A daughter of John I Comyn, Lord of Badenoch; Euphemia Comyn
- Issue: Andrew Moray
- Father: Walter de Moray
- Mother: a daughter of Sir Walter Olifard of Bothwell

Sir Andrew Moray, Lord of Petty (died 8 April 1298) was Justiciar of Scotia.

== Life ==
Andrew Moray was the younger son of Sir Walter de Moray, and a daughter of Sir Walter Olifard of Bothwell who was the son of Sir David Olifard of Bothwell. He and his son were amongst the Scottish noblemen captured following the Battle of Dunbar in 1296. Moray was imprisoned in the Tower of London, where he died on 8 April 1298.

== Marriage and issue ==
According to Andrew of Wyntoun, Sir Andrew Moray married a daughter of John I Comyn, Lord of Badenoch, and had issue:

- Andrew Moray (dow following the Battle of Stirling Bridge, 1297)

Moray married secondly Euphemia, widow of William Comyn of Kilbride, daughter of Roger FitzJohn and Isabel de Dunbar.

- William de Moray of Drumsagard
