= Hugh de Moravia =

12th-13th century Scottish noble

- Lord of Duffus, Strathbrock and Sutherland
- Died: c. 1219
- Noble family: de Moravia family
- Father: William, son of Freskin

Hugh de Moravia (Note: Also known as: Hugh, son of William, son of Freskin and Hugh Freskin) (died c. 1219), also known as Hugh Freskyn, Lord of Duffus, Strathbrock and Sutherland, was a Scottish noble.

He was the eldest son of William, the eldest son of Freskin, a Flemish settler who arrived in Scotland in the reign of King David I of Scotland. William had obtained a grant from King William I of Scotland, of the lands of Strathbrock in West Lothian, as well as Duffus, Roseisle, Inchkeil, Machir and Kintrae in Moray, between 1165 and 1171. Hugh inherited these lands upon the death of his father. He was granted a large estate around 1210 and was also known as Lord of Sutherland.

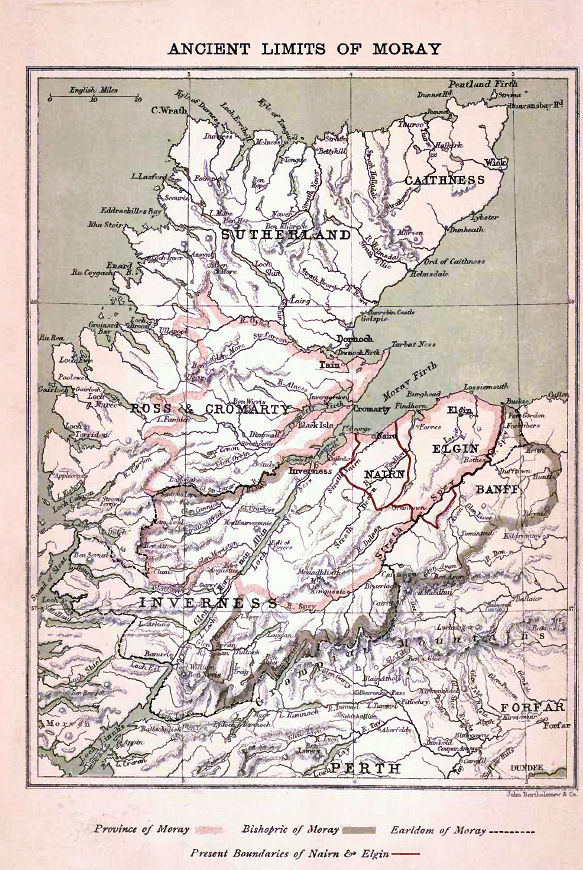
Map of medieval Moray and Sutherland from A History of Moray and Nairn by Charles Rampini, Edinburgh, 1897

== Marriage and issue ==
Hugh is known to have had the following issue:

- William de Moravia, Earl of Sutherland (died 1248), had issue.
- Walter de Moravia, Lord of Duffus and Strathbrock, married Euphemia de Ross, had issue.
- Andrew de Moravia, Bishop of Moray (died 1242).
