= Davidian Revolution =

Changes in Scotland during King David I's reign (1124–1153)

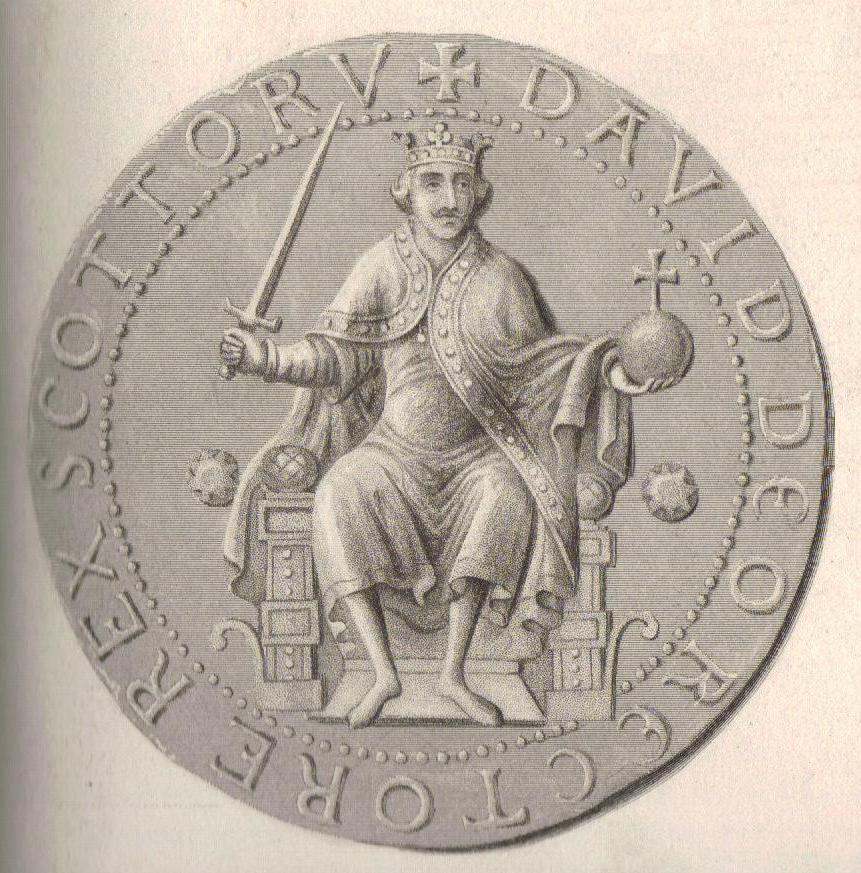
Steel engraving and enhancement of the obverse side of the Great Seal of David I, portraying David in the "European" fashion of the otherworldly maintainer of peace and defender of justice.

The Davidian Revolution is a name given by many scholars to the changes which took place in the Kingdom of Scotland during the reign of David I (1124–1153). These included his foundation of burghs, implementation of the ideals of Gregorian Reform, foundation of monasteries, Normanisation of the Scottish government, and the introduction of feudalism through immigrant Norman and Anglo-Norman knights, as well as Flemish settlers.

== Overview ==
King David I is still widely regarded as one of the most significant rulers in Scotland's history. The reason is what Barrow and Lynch both call the "Davidian Revolution". David's "revolution" is held to underpin the development of later medieval Scotland, whereby the changes that he inaugurated grew into most of the central non-native institutions of the later medieval kingdom. Barrow summarises the many and varied goals of David I, all of which began and ended with his determination "to surround his fortified royal residence and its mercantile and ecclesiastical satellites with a ring of close friends and supporters, bound to him and his heirs by feudal obligation and capable of rendering him military service of the most up-to-date kind and filling administrative offices at the highest level".

=== European Revolution: the wider context ===
Since Robert Bartlett's The Making of Europe: Conquest, Colonization and Cultural Change, 950–1350 (1993), reinforced by Moore's The First European Revolution, c.970–1215 (2000), it has become increasingly apparent that better understanding of David's "revolution" can be achieved by placing it in the context of a wider European "revolution". The central idea is that from the late 10th century onwards the culture and institutions of the old Carolingian heartlands in northern France and western Germany spread to outlying areas, creating a more recognisable "Europe". In this model, the old Carolingian Empire formed a "core" and the outlying areas a "periphery". The Norman conquest of England in the years after 1066 is considered to have made England more like if not part of this "core". In applying this model to Scotland, it would be considered that, as recently as the reign of David's father Máel Coluim III, "peripheral" Scotland had lacked – in relation to the "core" cultural regions of northern France, western Germany and England – respectable Catholic religion, a truly centralised royal government, conventional written documents of any sort, native coins, a single merchant town, as well as the essential castle-building cavalry elite. After David's reign, it had gained all of these.

During the reign of king David I, then, comparatively straightforward evidence of "Europeanisation" was produced in Scotland – that adoption of the homogenised political, economic, social and cultural modes of medieval civilisation, suitably modified for the distinctive Scottish milieu, which in tandem with similar adoptions elsewhere led to the creation of "Europe" as an identifiable entity for the first time. This is not to say that the Gaelic matrix into which these additions were disseminated was somehow destroyed or swept away; that was not the way in which the paradigm or "blueprint" of medieval Europe functioned – it was only a guide, one that specialised in amelioration, and not (usually) demolition.

=== European revolution: the Gaelic context ===
Yet, David's life as a "reformer" also has a context in the Gaelic-speaking world. This is particularly true in understanding David's enthusiasm for the Gregorian Reform. The latter was a revolutionary movement within the western church spearheaded vigorously in the papacy of Pope Gregory VII which sought renewed spiritual rigour, ecclesiastical discipline and doctrinal obedience to the papacy and its sponsored theologians. The Normans who came to England adopted this ideology, and soon began attacking the Scottish and Irish Gaelic world as spiritually backward – a mindset which even underlay the hagiography of David's mother Margaret, written by her confessor Thurgot at the instigation of the English royal court. Yet up until this period, Gaelic monks (often called Céli Dé) from Ireland and Scotland had been pioneering their own kind of ascetic reform both in Great Britain and in continental Europe, where they founded many of their own monastic houses. Since the end of the 11th century various Gaelic princes had themselves been attempting to accommodate Gregorian reform, examples being Muirchertach Ua Briain, Toirdelbach Ua Conchobair, and Edgar and Alexander I of Scotland. Benjamin Hudson stresses the cultural unity of Scotland and Ireland in this period, and uses the example of cooperation between David I, the Scottish reformer, and his Irish counterpart St Malachy, to show at least partly that David's actions can be understood in the Gaelic context as much as the Anglo-Norman one. Indeed, the Gaelic world had never been closed off from its neighbours in England or continental Europe. Gaelic warriors and holy men had been travelling regularly through England and the continent for centuries. David's predecessor Macbeth (King, 1040–57) had employed Norman mercenaries even before the conquest of England, and English exiles after the conquest fled to the courts of both Máel Coluim III, King of Scotland, and Toirdelbach Ua Briain, High King of Ireland.

== Government and feudalism ==
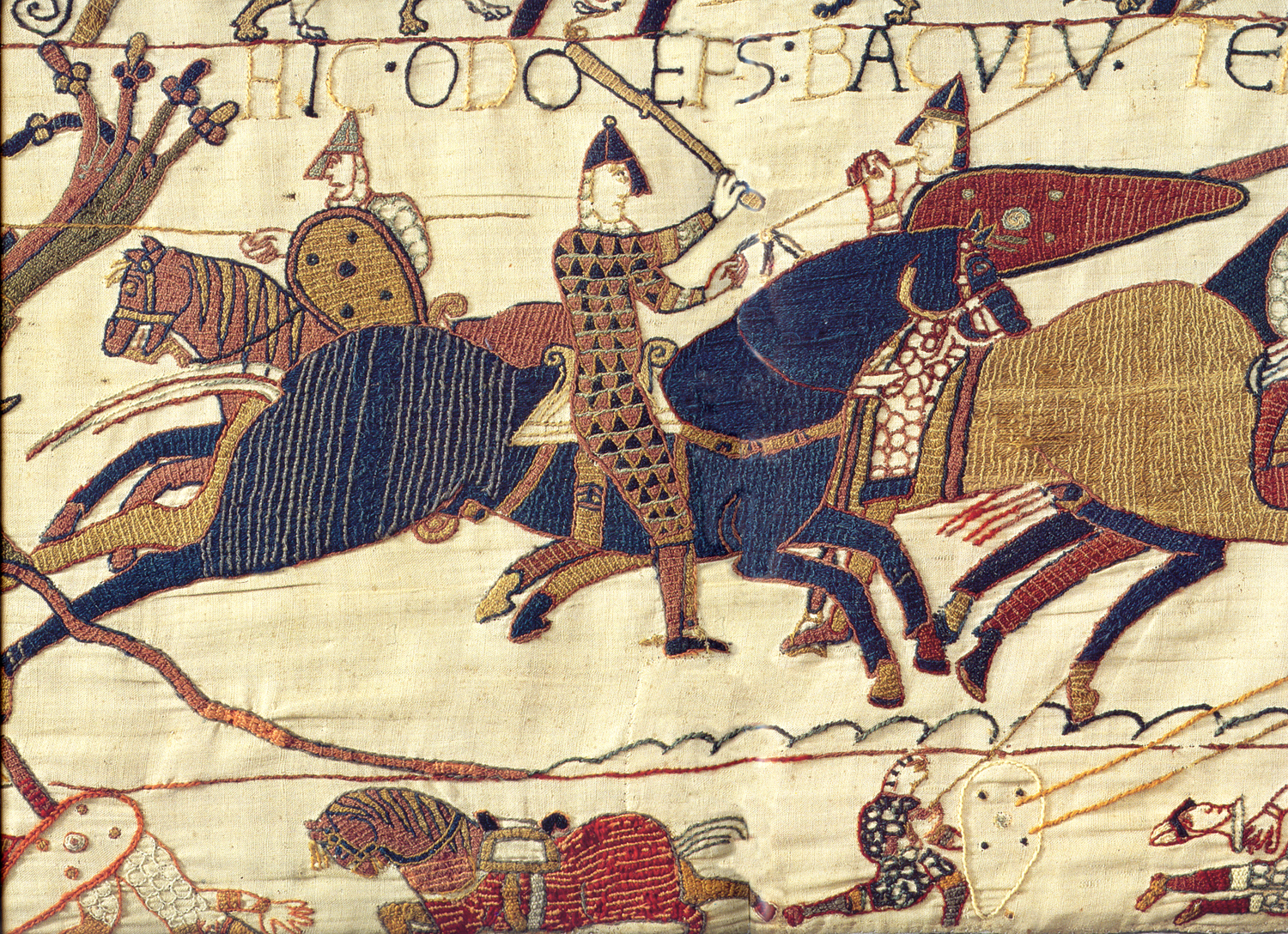
A detail from the Bayeux Tapestry illustrating Norman knights in combat half a century before David's reign.

The widespread enfeoffment of foreign knights and the processes by which land ownership was converted from a matter of customary tenure into a matter of feudal or otherwise legally defined relationships revolutionised the way the Kingdom of Scotland was governed, as did the dispersal and installation of royal agents in the new mottes that were proliferating throughout the realm to staff newly created sheriffdoms and judiciaries for the twin purposes of law enforcement and taxation, bringing Scotland further into the "European" model.

=== Military feudalism ===
During this period, Scotland experienced innovations in governmental practices and the importation of foreign, generally French, knights. It is to David's reign that the beginnings of Scottish feudalism and seignorialism are generally assigned. Geoffrey Barrow wrote that David's reign witnessed "a revolution in Scots dynastic law" as well as "fundamental innovations in military organization" and "in the composition and dominant characteristics of its ruling class". This is defined as "castle-building, the regular use of professional cavalry, the knight's fee" as well as "homage and fealty". David established large scale feudal lordships in the west of his Cumbrian principality for the leading members of the French military entourage who kept him in power. Additionally, many smaller-scale feudal lordships were created. One example would be Freskin. The latter's name occurs in a charter by David's grandson King William to Freskin's son, William, granting Strathbrock in West Lothian and Duffus, Kintrae, and other lands in Moray, "which his father held in the time of King David". The name Freskin is Flemish, and in the words of Geoffrey Barrow "it is virtually certain that Freskin belonged to a large group of Flemish settlers who came to Scotland in the middle decades of the 12th century and were chiefly to be found in West Lothian and the valley of the Clyde". Freskin was responsible for building a castle in the distant territory of Moray, and because Freskin had no kinship ties to the locality, his position was dependent entirely on the king, thus bringing the territory more firmly under royal control. Freskin's land acquisition does not appear to be unique, and may have been part of a royal policy in the aftermath of the defeat of king Óengus of Moray.

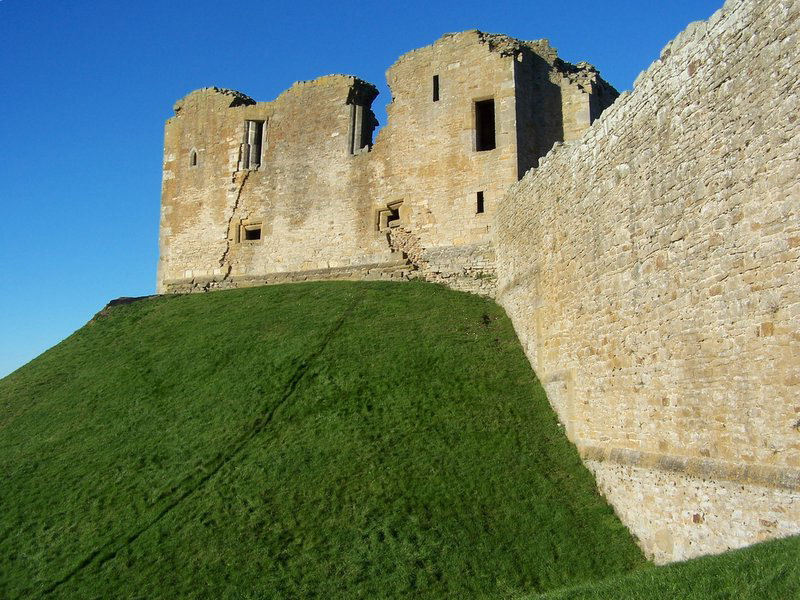
Duffus Castle, possibly begun by Freskin, one of David's most successful small scale military immigrants.

=== Anglo-Normanising government ===
Steps were taken during David's reigns to make the government of Scotland, or that part of Scotland that he administered, more like the government of Anglo-Norman England. New sheriffdoms enabled the King to effectively administer royal demesne land. During David I's reign, royal sheriffs had been established in the king's core personal territories; namely, in rough chronological order, at Roxburgh, Scone, Berwick-upon-Tweed, Stirling and Perth. The Justiciarship too was created in David's reign. Two Justiciarships were created, one for Scotland-proper and one for Lothian, i.e. for Scotland north of the river Forth and Scotland south of the Forth and east of Galloway. Although this institution had Anglo-Norman origins, in Scotland north of the Forth at least it represented some form of continuity with an older office. For instance, Mormaer Causantín of Fife is styled judex magnus (i.e. great Brehon); the Justiciarship of Scotia hence was just as much a Gaelic office modified by Normanisation as it was an import, illustrating Barrow's "balance of New and Old" argument.

== Economy ==
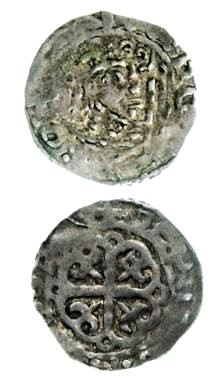
Silver penny of David I.

=== Alston mines ===
An important source of David's wealth during his career came from the revenue of his English earldom and the proceeds of the silver mines at Alston. Alston silver allowed David to indulge in the "regalian gratification" of his own coinage and to continue his project of attempting to link royal power and economic expansion. Building programmes depended to a large degree on disposable income; consumption of foreign and exotic commodities broadened; men of ability and ambition found their way to court and entered the service of the king. What is more, no less than the written word, the coin acted upon the culture and mental categories of people who made use of it. Like a seal displaying the king in majesty, the coin broadcast the image of the ruler to his people and, more fundamentally, altered the simple nature of trade. Though coins were not absent from Scotland before David, these were by definition foreign objects, unseen and unused by most of the population. The arrival of a native coinage – no less than the arrival of towns, laws and charters – marked the penetration of the "Europeanising" concepts of European culture into ever less "non-European" Scotland.

=== Creation of burghs ===
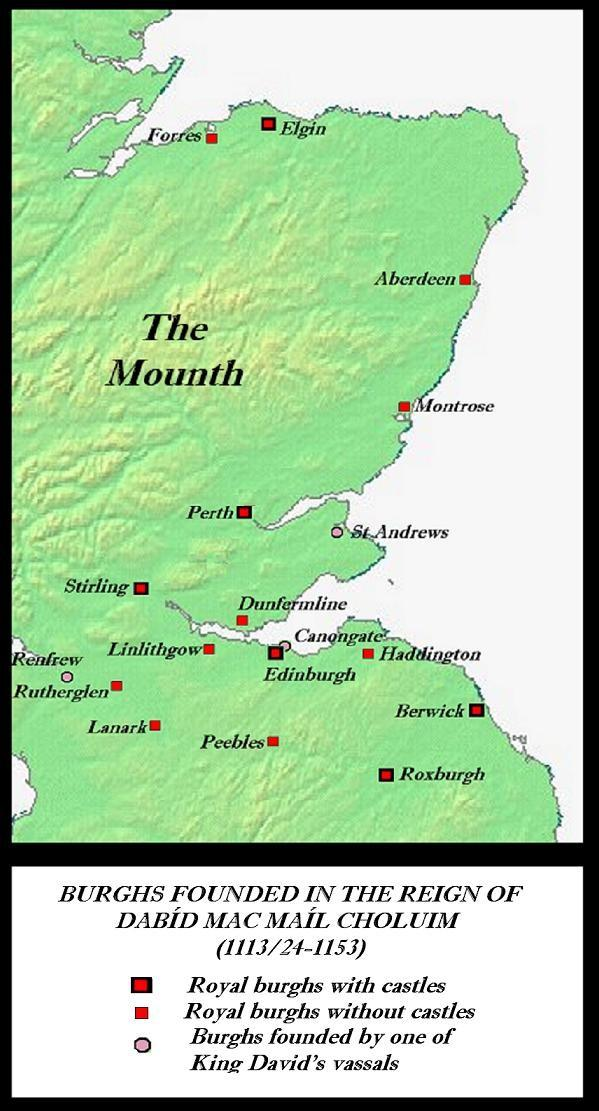
Burghs established in Scotland before the accession of David's successor and grandson, Máel Coluim IV; these were essentially Scotland-proper's first towns.

David was also a great town builder. In part, he made use of the "English" income secured for him by his marriage to Matilda de Senlis in order to finance the construction of the first true towns in Scotland, and these, in turn, allowed the establishment of several more. As Prince of the Cumbrians, David founded the first two burghs of "Scotland", at Roxburgh and Berwick. These were settlements with defined boundaries and guaranteed trading rights, locations where the king could collect and sell the products of his cain and conveth (a payment made in lieu of providing the king hospitality) rendered to him. These burghs were essentially Scotland's first towns. David would found more of these burghs when he became King of Scots. Before 1135, David laid the foundations of four more burghs, this time in the new territory he had acquired as King of Scots; burghs were founded at Stirling, Dunfermline and Edinburgh, three of David's favoured residences. Around 15 burghs have their foundations traced to the reign of David I, although because of the sparsity of some of the evidence, this exact number is uncertain.

=== Effect of the burghs ===
Perhaps nothing in David's reign compares in importance to this. No institution would do more to reshape the long-term economic and ethnic shape of Scotland than the burgh. These planned towns were or became English in culture and language; as William of Newburgh would write in the reign of King William the Lion, describing the persecution of English-speakers in Scotland, "the towns and burghs of the Scottish realm are known to be inhabited by English" and the failure of these towns to go native would in the long term undermine the position of the Gaelic language and give birth to the idea of the Scottish Lowlands.

The thesis that the "rise of towns" was indirectly responsible for the medieval flourishing of Europe has been accepted, at least in a circumscribed form, from the time of Henri Pirenne, a century ago. Commerce generated by and the economic privileges granted to merchant towns across northern Europe in the eleventh and twelfth centuries paid for, in new revenues, the increasing diversification of society and ensured that further growth would occur. What was of great importance for the future of Scotland was the creation by David of perhaps seven such jurisdictionally licensed communities at ancient royal centres and even at new sites, the latter mainly along his eastern seaboard. While this could not, at first, have amounted to much more than the nucleus of an immigrant merchant class making use of the established marketplace for the purpose of disposing of the purely local harvest, in both crop and chattels, there is a sense of profound expectation inherent in such foundations. Regional trade and international trade never lagged far behind the opening of the royal burgh to the world, and that most such burghs were kept in royal demesne meant that the king reserved the right to an excise on all transactions occurring within their bounds and to charge custom dues on those vessels taking berth in their harbours.

== Religious reform ==
The changes that David was most noted for at the time, however, were his religious changes. The reason for this is that practically all our sources were Reform-minded monks or clerics, grateful to David for his efforts. David's changes, or alleged changes, can be divided into two parts: monastic patronage and ecclesiastical restructuring.

=== Monastic patronage ===
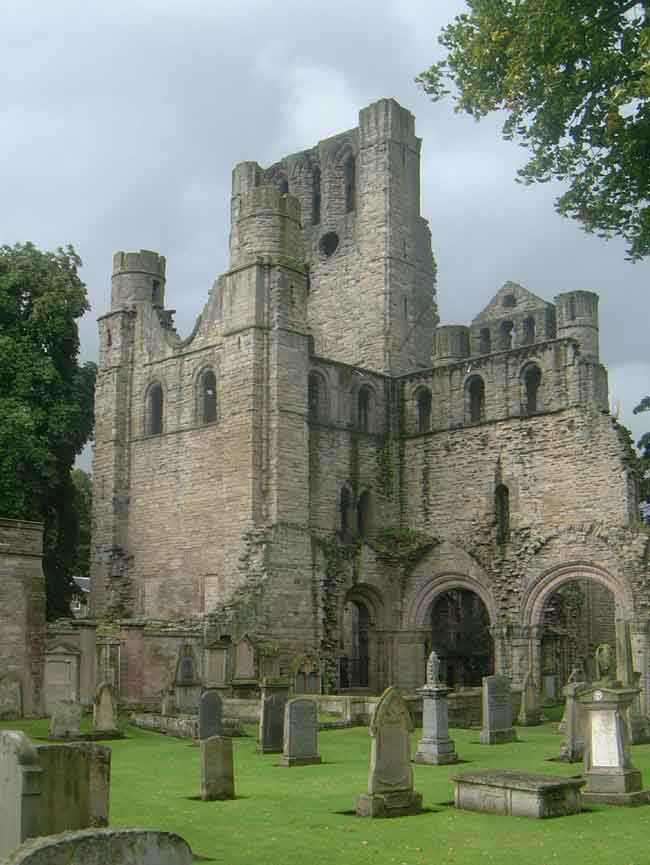
The modern ruins of Kelso Abbey. This establishment was originally at Selkirk from 1113, but was moved to Kelso in 1128 to better serve David's southern "capital" at Roxburgh.

David was certainly at least one of medieval Scotland's greatest monastic patrons. In 1113, in perhaps David's first act as Prince of the Cumbrians, he founded Selkirk Abbey for the Tironensian Order. Several years later, perhaps in 1116, David visited Tiron itself, probably to acquire more monks; in 1128 he transferred Selkirk Abbey to Kelso, nearer Roxburgh, at this point his chief residence. In 1144, David and Bishop John of Glasgow prompted Kelso Abbey to found a daughter house, Lesmahagow Priory. David also continued his predecessor Alexander's patronage of the Augustinians, founding Holyrood Abbey with monks from Merton Priory. David and Bishop John, moreover, established Jedburgh Abbey with canons from Beauvais in 1138. Other Augustinian foundations included St Andrew's Cathedral Priory, established by David and Bishop Robert of St Andrews in 1140, which in turn founded an establishment at Loch Leven (1150x1153); an Augustinian abbey, whose canons were taken from Arrouaise in France, was established by the year 1147 at Cambuskenneth near Stirling, another prominent royal centre. However, by 23 March 1137 David had also turned his patronage towards the Cistercian Order, founding the famous Melrose Abbey from monks of Rievaulx. Melrose would become the greatest medieval monastic establishment in Scotland south of the river Forth. It was from Melrose that David established Newbattle Abbey in Midlothian, Kinloss Abbey in Moray, and Holmcultram Abbey in Cumberland. David also, like Alexander, patronised Benedictines, introducing monks to Coldingham (a non-monastic property of Durham Priory) in 1139 and having made it a priory by 1149. David's activities were paralleled by other "Scottish" magnates. For instance, the Premonstratensian house of Dryburgh Abbey was founded in 1150 by monks from Alnwick Abbey with the patronage of Hugh de Morville, Lord of Lauderdale. Moreover, six years after the foundation of Melrose Abbey, King Fergus of Galloway likewise founded a Cistercian abbey from Rievaulx, Dundrennan Abbey, which would become a powerful landowner in both Galloway and Ireland and was known to Francesco Pegolotti as Scotland's richest abbey.

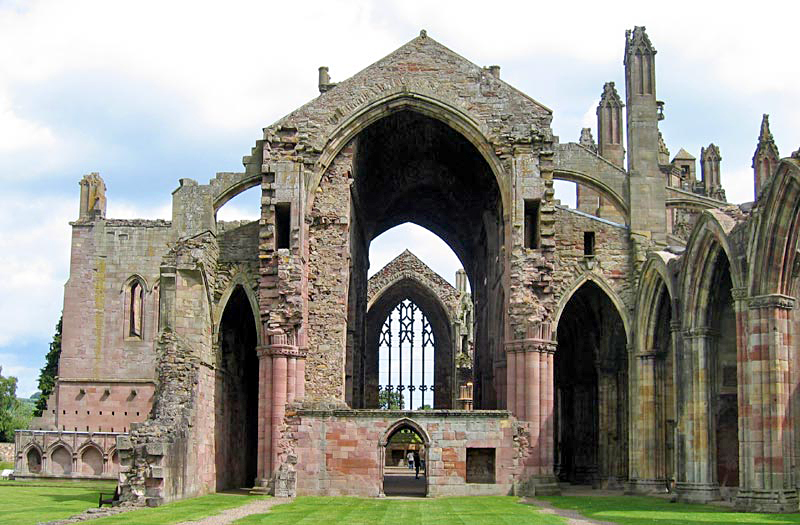
The modern ruins of Melrose Abbey. Founded in 1137, this Cistercian monastery became one of David's greatest legacies.

Not only were such monasteries an expression of David's undoubted piety, but they also functioned to transform Scottish society. Monasteries became centres of foreign influence, being founded by French or English monks. They provided sources of literate men, able to serve the crown's growing administrative needs. This was particularly the case with the Augustinians. Moreover, these new monasteries, and the Cistercian ones in particular, introduced new agricultural practices. In the words of one historian, the Cistercians were "pioneers or frontiersmen ... cultural revolutionaries, who carried new techniques of land management and new attitudes towards land exploitation". Duncan calls Scotland's new Cistercian establishments "the largest and most significant contribution by David I to the religious life of the kingdom". Cistercians equated spiritual health with economic achievement and environmental exploitation. Cistercian labour transformed southern Scotland into one of northern Europe's main sources of sheep wool.

=== Bishopric of Glasgow ===
Almost as soon as he was in charge of the Cumbrian principality, David placed the bishopric of Glasgow under his chaplain, John, whom David may have met for the first time during his participation in Henry's conquest of Normandy after 1106. John himself was closely associated with the Tironensian Order, and presumably committed to the new Gregorian ideas regarding episcopal organisation. David carried out an inquest, afterwards assigned to the bishopric all the lands of his principality, except those in the east of his principality which were already governed by the Scotland proper-based bishop of St Andrews. David was responsible for assigning to Glasgow enough lands directly to make the bishopric self-sufficient and for ensuring that in the longer term Glasgow would become the second most important bishopric in the Kingdom of Scotland. By the 1120s, work also began on building a proper cathedral for the diocese. David would also try to ensure that his reinvigorated episcopal see would retain independence from other bishoprics, an aspiration which would generate a great deal of tension with the English church, where both the Archbishop of Canterbury and the Archbishop of York claimed overlordship.

=== Church organisation ===
It was once held that Scotland's episcopal sees and entire parochial system owed their origins to the innovations of David I. Today, scholars have moderated this view. Although David moved the bishopric of Mortlach east to his new burgh of Aberdeen, and arranged the creation of the diocese of Caithness, no other bishoprics can be safely called David's creation. The bishopric of Glasgow was restored rather than resurrected. In the case of the Bishop of Whithorn, the resurrection of that see was the work of Thurstan, Archbishop of York, with King Fergus of Galloway and the cleric Gille Aldan. That aside, Ailred of Rievaulx wrote in David's eulogy that when David came to power, "he found three or four bishops in the whole Scottish kingdom [north of the Forth], and the others wavering without a pastor to the loss of both morals and property; when he died, he left nine, both of ancient bishoprics which he himself restored, and new ones which he erected". What is very likely is that as well as preventing the long vacancies in bishoprics which had hitherto been common, David was at least partly responsible for forcing semi-monastic "bishoprics" like Brechin, Dunkeld, Mortlach (Aberdeen) and Dublane to become fully episcopal and firmly integrated into a national diocesan system. As for the development of the parochial system, David's traditional role as its creator can not be sustained. Scotland already had an ancient system of parish churches dating to the Early Middle Ages, and the kind of system introduced by David's Normanising tendencies can more accurately be seen as mild refashioning, rather than creation; he made the Scottish system as a whole more like that of France and England, but he did not create it.
