= Fearchar, Earl of Ross =

Scottish noble (died c. 1251)

- Coat of arms
- Tenure: 1223–1251
- Successor: William I, Earl of Ross
- Issue: Euphemia; Cairistíona inghean Fearchair; William I, Earl of Ross

Fearchar of Ross or Ferchar mac in tSagairt (Fearchar mac an t-sagairt, often anglicized as Farquhar MacTaggart), was the first of the Scottish Ó Beólláin (O’Beolan, Beolan) family who received by Royal Grant the lands and Title of Mormaer or Earl of Ross (1223–1251) we know of from the thirteenth century, whose career brought Ross into the fold of the Scottish kings for the first time, and who is remembered as the founder of the Earldom of Ross.

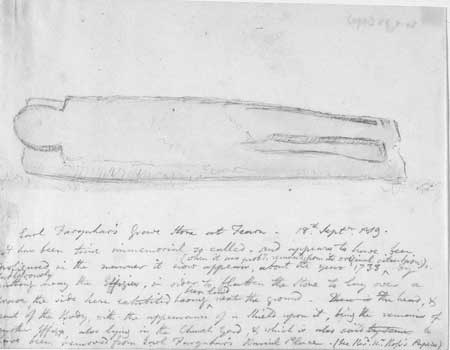
Hutton's sketch of Ferchar's tomb, Fearn Abbey, 1819

== Origins ==
The traditional story is that Fearchar was part of the ancient family Ó Beólláin (O'Beolain, Boland, Bolan) of the Gaelic Cenél Eoghain that were co-arbs (hereditary abbots) of St. Maelrubha at Applecross in Ross-shire. This idea goes back to the work of the great William F. Skene, and indeed, even before him, with William Reeves, whom Skene cited. The historian Alexander Grant has recently challenged this theory, arguing that the evidence for this origin is far too thin to contradict the intuitive and well attested idea that he came from Easter Ross. Grant takes up the idea instead that mac an t-Sacairt (= Son of the Priest') probably refers to a background as keeper of the shrine to St Duthac, at Tain, Scotland.

However, despite "Ross" being a word describing the land the Earls managed (hence the Earl of Ross), Sir Robert Gordon (Earldom of Sutherland, P.36) states the Earls of Ross were first of the surname Ó Beólláin, and then were Leslies…) and continues on page 46 they are called by the surname Ó Beólláin through 1333 when "Hugh Beolan, Earl of Ross" is recorded as one of the slain at the battle of Halidon Hill. The surname remains as the surname of the Earls of Ross from Uilleam Ó Beólláin I, Earl of Ross until the death of Uilleam Ó Beólláin III, Earl of Ross in 1372 when his daughter, Euphemia I, Countess of Ross married to Sir Walter Leslie. Ross became the surname of the Earls of Ross much later in the history of the Earldom (much like the name "Windsor" is also used as the 20th century surname for the Royal Family). It was the 4th Earl of Ross that first took on the surname Ross.

== Career ==
Scholarly work on Fearchar has led to the conclusion that Fearchar was a native nobleman who benefitted by upholding the interests of the King of Scots. Fearchar emerges from nothingness in 1215, as the local warlord who crushed a large-scale revolt against the Scottish king, Alexander II. The Chronicle of Melrose reported that :

"Machentagar attacked them and mightily overthrew the king's enemies; and he cut off their heads and presented them as gifts to the new king ... And because of this, the lord king appointed him a new knight."

Fearchar's ability to defeat the proven might of the Meic Uilleim and MacHeths together suggests that Fearchar could command large military resources, and as McDonald points out, this can hardly be entirely explained by his background as a hereditary priest from Tain. However, the Scottish kings themselves were hardly without authority in Ross, and their position could command social power even in this distant land, something proved by the MacWilliams, whose authority depended on their descent from a Scottish king. Fearchar's power then is not so mysterious.

=== Promotion to Mormaer ===
It is possible that Fearchar was made Mormaer when the grateful King Alexander II visited Inverness in 1221. Macdonald, however, gives some reasons why this might be a little early; around 1226 is a more likely date, but he was almost certainly Mormaer by 1230, and definitely by 1232, the year in which Fearchar's initial (as the father of his son Uilleam) appears in a charter, with the style Comes de Ross (i.e. Mormaer of Ross). Fearchar's initial and comital style also appear in a charter granting some lands to Walter de Moravia, a charter dating somewhere between 1224 and 1231.

So did Fearchar appear from nowhere as a "novus homo"? The facts are that we do not know what happened to the Mormaerdom of Ross after the death, in 1168, of the last known Mormaer, Malcolm MacHeth. We might compare Ross with other Mormaerdoms, such as Lennox and Carrick, in which these apparently new Mormaerdoms were merely de iure royal grants to native lords who already possessed kinship leadership and de facto status as provincial rulers. In this view, conferring this style was simply an act of harnessing organic Gaelic power structures to the political, terminological and ideological framework of the regnum Scottorum.

=== Fearchar & Scotland ===
In 1235, it is reported that Fearchar was active in Galloway. The Revolt of Gille Ruadh in Galloway in 1234/5 required a large-scale levying by the Scottish king. King Alexander invaded Galloway, and Gille Ruadh ambushed the royal army, almost bringing it to destruction. However the Scottish King was saved by Fearchar, who appeared to the rescue with the Men of Ross.

The defeat of the rebellious Galwegians by another peripheral Gaelic lord in the service of the Scottish King had been parallelled in 1187, when Lochlann, Lord of Galloway defeated the rebellious Domnall mac Uilleim, claimant of the Scottish throne, at the Battle of Mam Garvia, somewhere near Dingwall. In fact, one historian has linked the two events as revenge.

Fearchar was also recorded as being present at the negotiations which led to the Treaty of York, signed in 1237

== Marriages & Family ==
One of Fearchar's daughters, called Euphemia, was married to Walter de Moravia, a magnate who ruled Duffus. Walter's family were of Flemish origin, and had been planted in Moray by the Scottish crown as agents of royal authority, but were steadily building an independent power-base. Christina, another of Fearchar's daughters, was married to Amlaibh, the King of Mann and the Isles. If we are to use the chronology of the Chronicles of Mann, this happened sometime before 1223, but after 1188. Such a move is not surprising, as the Manx king ruled over the isle of Skye. This reminds us that Fearchar was not merely a slavish Scottish magnate with narrow local aspirations, but an ambitious Gaelic warlord with greater regional goals in the Norse-Gaelic world of the Irish Sea, the world of Alan, Lord of Galloway and the Manx kings.

== Church Patronage ==
Fearchar's wider connections are further illustrated by his religious patronage. In the 1220s he granted the Premonstratensian Order (perhaps the most modern one about) of Whithorn in Galloway a new monastery at Mid Fearn in Ross, moving it a decade later to New Fearn. They brought with them some relics of St Ninian too, which is why to this day Fearn Abbey is associated with that saint. Such a move was hardly surprising, since all aspiring magnates needed their own monastery.

== Death ==
We do not know the precise year in which Fearchar died. The traditional date, 1251, is based on the date given in the spurious Ane Breve Cronicle of the Erllis of Ross. The latter gives his birthplace as Tain. Despite the unreliability of this source and date, he was certainly dead by the 1250s, when his son appears as Mormaer in his own right.

== Notes ==
Preceded by MacHeths	Mormaer of Ross; 1223–1251	Succeeded by Uilleam I
