= Walter Olifard =

Sir Walter Olifard the elder, was Justiciar (of the Lothians), governing the southern half of Scotland (c.1178–c.1188) south of the rivers Forth and Clyde (excluding Galloway).

== Personal life ==
Sir Walter Olifard was the eldest son of Sir David Olifard In a charter in the Melrose Abbey collection both father and son are witnesses and their relationship is given. He married Christian, daughter of Ferchar, Earl of Strathearn in 1173. By his wife he had two sons Sir Walter Olifard (also Justiciar of the Lothians - the third generation of the family to be so) and David Olifard.

He appears to have died around 1222.

== Land holdings ==
Olifard received as a dowry with his bride, the lands and parish of Strageath (now known as Blackford), near Crieff. Ten years later these lands were exchanged (excambed) with Olifard's brother-in-law Gilbert, 2nd Earl of Strathearn for the estate of Aberdalgie, just south of Perth.

Olifard inherited Bothwell, Smailholm and Crailing from his father. Olifard also inherited the Parish of Cambuslang in the Barony of Drumsergard – whose castle ruins can be discerned to the south-east of Hallside - can be traced back to the time of King Alexander II of Scotland (1214–49) when it belonged to Walter Olifard. Cambuslang joined the lands of Bothwell, which Olifard also owned by right of his father.

In England Olifard also inherited Lilford in Northamptonshire from his uncle or from his grandparents, from whom Olifard also inherited Oakington in Cambridge and in the same county, he also inherited the manor of Over (part of which later became the manor of Gavelock) His father did not own any lands in England as they had been stripped from him (David Olifard), for his loyalty to King David 1 of Scotland after 1141.

== Career ==
In 1174, King William of Scotland was captured by the English at Alnwick and sent to Falaise in Normandy, where he was imprisoned. Twenty one Scottish nobles, including Walter Olifard, were sent to negotiate a treaty for their monarch's release. The terms of King William's release included him becoming a liegeman to King Henry of England and the Scots nobles present became hostages until the castles of Edinburgh, Stirling, Roxburgh, Berwick and Jedburgh were surrendered to England. The attending nobles all had to swear allegiance to King Henry before he was released, Olifard had to hand over his own son as a hostage as a guarantee for his own good behaviour.

Olifard distinguished himself as Justiciar of Lothian under Alexander II. Nobody in Scotland at that time, was more trusted in public councils or in private affairs, or more worthy of trust, than Walter.

He was one of the most frequent witnesses to the charters of Alexander II. As can be seen in the Melrose Charters.

Walter Olifard granted the church of Smailholm, with its pertinents, to the monks of Coldingham. Chart. Coldingham, 18; and he confirmed a grant of Claribald de Olifard of Esseby to the same monks of two fishings in the Tweed.

Walter Olifard appears in Northants Pipe Roll 26 HenryII (1179-1180).

Preceded by Robert Avenel, Richard Comyn	Justiciar of Lothian c.1178–c.1188	Succeeded by Patrick I, Earl of Dunbar
