= Pantler of Scotland =

The office of Pantler of Scotland (referred to in documents as Latin: Paniterius Scotiae) was a court position in the Kingdom of Scotland during the High Middle Ages. The now historical term pantler or panter designated an officer responsible for the pantry or food supplies in general in a royal court.

== Office holders ==
- Ailif
- Nicholas, the son of Ailif
- William St Clair of Roslin
- Henry St Clair of Roslin
- William Moray of Bothwell
- Sir Andrew de Moravia
- Sir John de Moravia, Lord of Bothwell
- Sir Thomas de Moravia, brother of the above, Lord of Bothwell
- Archibald the Grim, Lord of Galloway and Earl of Douglas
- Henry II Sinclair, Earl of Orkney

== See also ==
- Grand Panetier of France
