= Walter de Moray =

Scottish noble

- Lord of Petty, Bracholy, Boharm and Arteldol
- Died: c. 1278
- Noble family: de Moravia family
- Father: William de Moravia of Petty

Sir Walter de Moray (Note: Also Walter de Moravia and Walter de Petyn) (died c.1278), Lord of Petty, Bracholy, Boharm, Arteldol and Bothwell, Justiciar of Lothian was a 13th-century Scottish noble.

== Life ==
Moray was a son of William de Moravia of Petty and a daughter of Walter Olifard. He had succeeded his father by 1226 and accompanied King Alexander II of Scotland into England to meet with King Henry III of England in 1236. Walter inherited the lands of Bothwell and Drumsargard in Lanarkshire and Smailholm in Berwickshire in 1242. He served as Justiciar of Lothian in 1255. His eldest son succeeded in 1278, and was known as "Dominius de Bothwell" (Lord of Bothwell). He also held lands in Agenway, Botruphin, Kainermonth, Croy, Ardtrillen, Lunyn and Duldavy.

== Marriage and issue ==
Walter married a daughter of Máel Coluim II, Earl of Fife and are known to have had the following issue:

- William de Moray of Bothwell (died c. 1300), without issue.
- Andrew de Moray (died 1298), married firstly a daughter of John I Comyn, Lord of Badenoch, had issue. Married secondly, Euphemia relict of William Comyn, Lord of Kilbride, she was the daughter of Roger FitzJohn and Isabel de Dunbar, without issue.
- David de Moravia, Bishop of Moray.
