= Freskin de Moray =

13th-century Scottish noble

- Lord of Duffus and Strathbrock
- Died: c. 1268
- Buried: Chapel of St Lawrence within the parish church of St Peter, Duffus
- Noble family: de Moravia family
- Father: Walter de Moravia
- Mother: Euphemia de Ross

Freskin de Moray (died c. 1268), Lord of Duffus and Strathbrock, was a Scottish noble.

He was the only son of Walter de Moravia and Euphemia de Ross. Freskin was a signatory to an agreement between Scotland and Wales in 1258 by which the kingdoms agreed neither would make peace with King Henry III of England without the consent of the other. Freskin died before 1268 and was buried in the Chapel of St Lawrence, within the parish church of St Peter, Duffus. His lands were split in moieties between his daughters.

== Marriage and issue ==
Freskin married Joanna, Lady of Strathnaver, they are known to have had the following issue:

- Mary de Moray, married Reginald le Chen, had issue.
- Christian de Moray, married William de Fedderate, had issue.
