= William, son of Freskin =

12th-century Scoto-Flemish noble

- Lord of Duffus and Strathbrock
- Died: c. 1203
- Noble family: de Moravia family
- Father: Freskin

William, son of Freskin (died c. 1203), Lord of Duffus and Strathbrock, was a Scoto-Flemish noble.

He was the eldest son of Freskin, a Flemish settler who arrived in Scotland in the reign of King David I of Scotland. William obtained a grant from King William I of Scotland, of the lands of Strathbrock in West Lothian, as well as Duffus, Roseisle, Inchkeil, Machir and Kintrae in Moray, between 1165 and 1171.

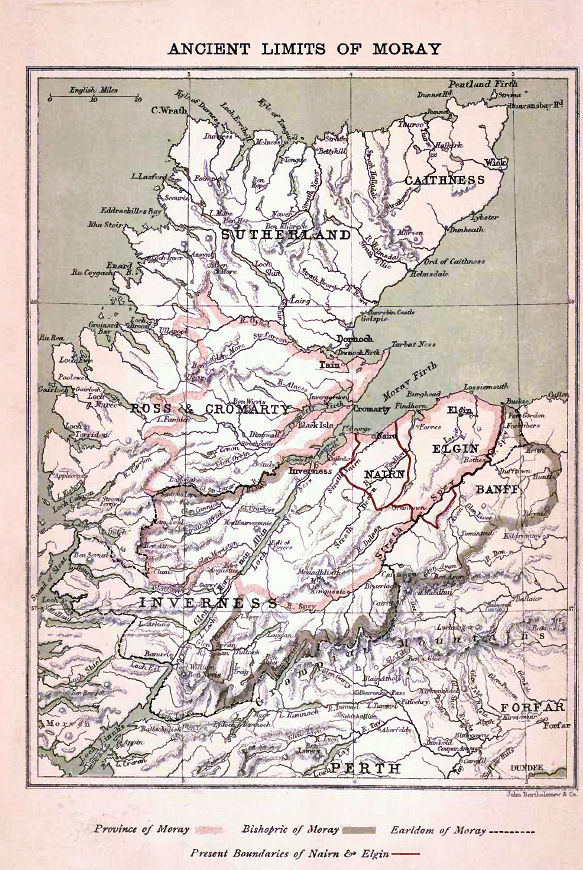
Map of medieval Moray from A History of Moray and Nairn by Charles Rampini, Edinburgh, 1897

== Marriage and issue ==
William is known to have had the following issue:

- Hugh de Moravia of Duffus and Strathbrock, had issue.
- William de Moravia of Petty, Bracholy, Boharm and Arteldol (died c. 1226), married a daughter of David de Olifard, had issue.
- Andrew de Moravia, parson of Duffus.
