= Bothwell Castle =

Medieval castle in Scotland

- Bothwell, South Lanarkshire, Scotland grid reference NS688593
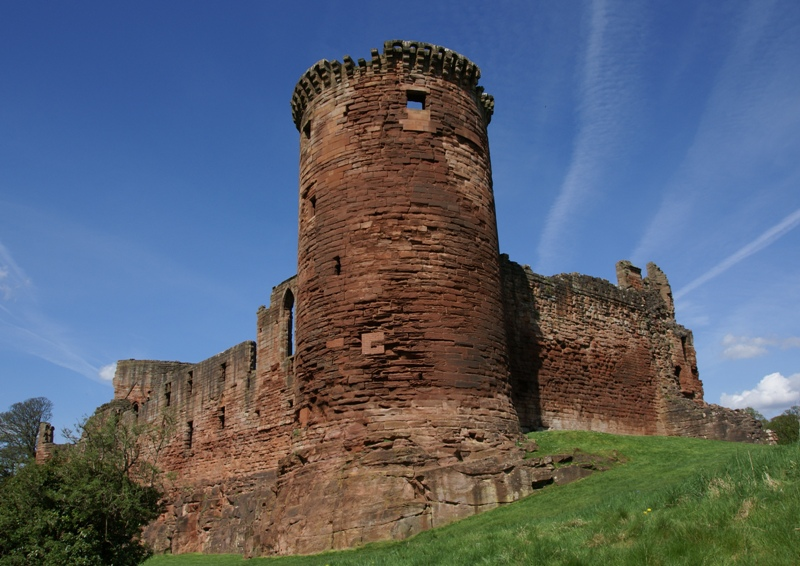
- South-east tower of the castle

Site information
- Type: Castle of enceinte
- Owner: Historic Environment Scotland
- Controlled by: De Moravia family England; Earl of Douglas; Earl of Angus
- Open to the public: Yes
- Condition: Ruined

Location
- Shown within Scotland
- Location within South Lanarkshire
- Coordinates: 55°48′34″N 4°05′42″W

Site history
- Built: Begun 13th century
- Built by: Walter de Moravia
- Materials: Coursed red sandstone rubble

Bothwell Castle is a large medieval castle, sited on a high, steep bank, above a bend in the River Clyde in South Lanarkshire, Scotland. It is located between Bothwell and Uddingston, about 10 miles (16 km) south-east of Glasgow. Construction of the castle was begun in the 13th century by the ancestors of Clan Murray, to guard a strategic crossing point of the Clyde. Bothwell played a key role in Scotland's Wars of Independence, changing hands several times.

The huge cylindrical donjon was built in the 13th century, but before the rest of the castle was completed it was severely damaged in a series of sieges. Rebuilding in the early 15th century enlarged the castle, but it was abandoned by the 18th century. The present ruin is rectangular, with the remains of the donjon to the west, and the later Great Hall to the east. The courtyard is enclosed by long curtain walls, with round towers at the south-east and south-west corners. The castle was described by Scottish archaeologist William Douglas Simpson as one of the "foremost secular structures of the Middle Ages in Scotland".

== History ==
King David I granted the barony of Bothwell to David Olifard (or Olifant), Justiciar of Lothian, in the mid 12th century. The lands passed to his descendants including his daughter who had married William de Moravia son of William son of Freskin, who was deceased by 1226 circa. Then by 1252 the barony became the property of their son Walter de Moravia, or Walter of Moray He began construction of the castle, but by the start of the Wars of Scottish Independence in 1296, only the main donjon, the prison tower, and the short connecting curtain wall were completed. Foundations of the remainder were probably in place, and would have been defended by a wooden palisade.

=== Wars of Scottish Independence ===
The forces of King Edward I of England invaded Scotland at the start of the war, and seized Bothwell. The castle was at this time held by Walter's son, William Moray of Bothwell. The English garrison holding the castle was besieged by the Scots for 14 months in 1298—1299, and eventually capitulated. Edward I returned in 1301, capturing the castle once more with a force of 6800 men, and specially constructed siege engines. Bothwell became the headquarters of Aymer de Valence, 2nd Earl of Pembroke, Edward's appointed Warden of Scotland, and remained in English hands for several years.

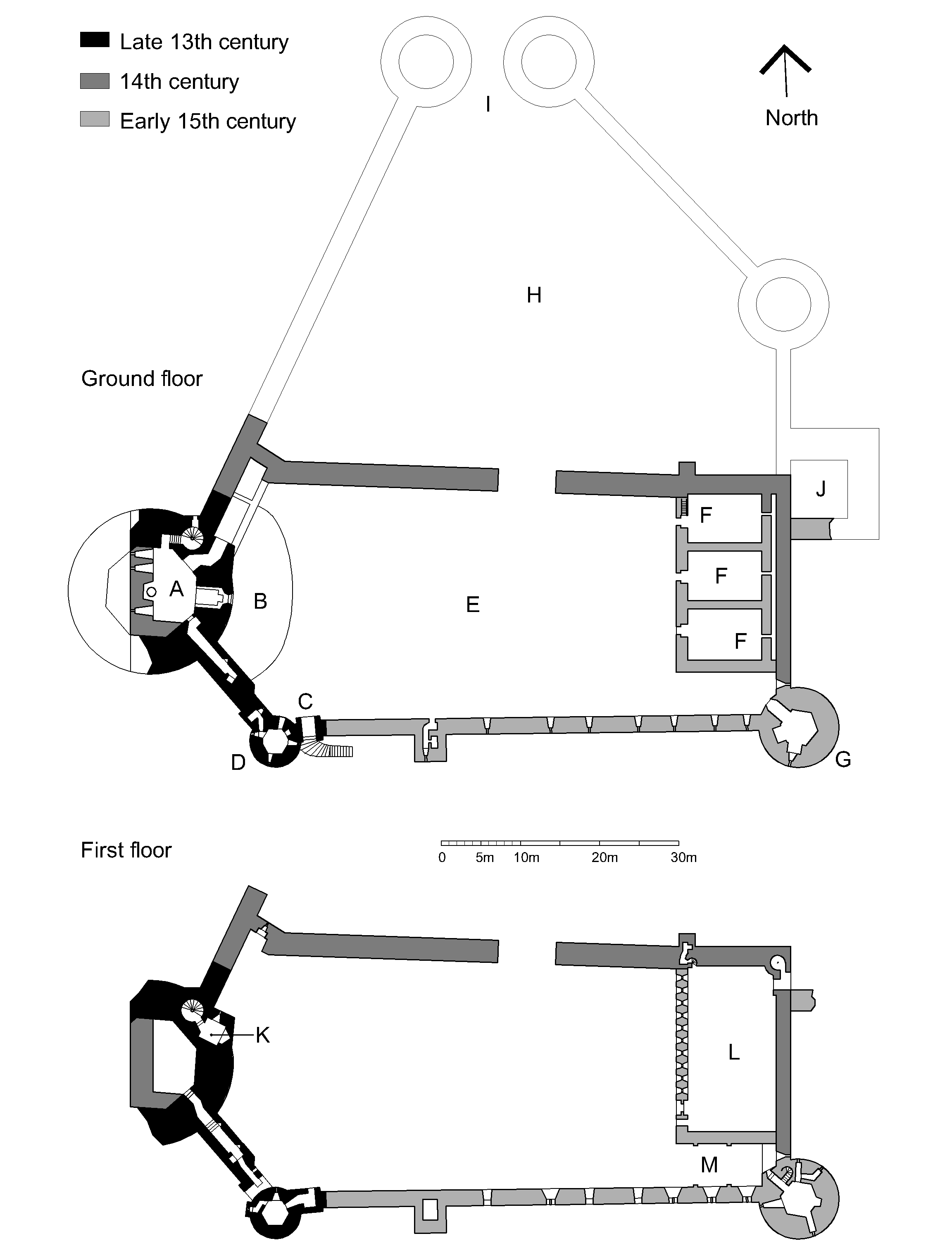
Plan of Bothwell Castle

Following Robert the Bruce's victory at Bannockburn in 1314, the castle provided shelter for several English nobles. However, the castle's constable, Sir Walter FitzGilbert, surrendered the castle to the approaching Scots. For this act, he was granted the barony of Cadzow, where his descendants became the powerful Hamilton family. The Scots slighted the castle after its surrender.

In 1336 the English returned again, this time under Edward III. The English king had the castle repaired, and again made it his headquarters in Scotland. The following year, however, Sir Andrew Murray, great-nephew of Sir William and the rightful owner of Bothwell, recaptured the stronghold, again using siege engines. Following his victory he slighted the castle once more, pulling down the west side of the donjon and tumbling it into the Clyde, in order that it could not be reoccupied by the enemy. The castle remained derelict until the 1360s.

=== Douglas ===
In 1362, Joan Moray of Bothwell, heiress of the Morays, married Archibald Douglas, nicknamed "the Grim" and later to be Lord of Galloway and Earl of Douglas. Douglas commenced rebuilding Bothwell, repairing the donjon and completing the walls. The work was continued by his son, Archibald, the 4th Earl. By 1424 they had constructed the Great Hall and adjacent chapel, with towers at the north-east and south-east corners, and curtain walls connecting to the donjon, enclosing the courtyard.

The "Black" Douglases were forfeited in 1455, and their lands returned to the crown. James III granted Bothwell to Lord Crichton, and then to Sir John Ramsay, who were both forfeited in turn. In 1488 Bothwell was granted again to Patrick Hepburn, 2nd Lord Hailes, and the Earldom of Bothwell was created for him. Hepburn did not retain Bothwell Castle for long, however, exchanging it with Archibald Douglas, 5th Earl of Angus, known as "Bell-the-Cat", in return for Hermitage Castle in Liddesdale. James IV visited Bothwell in 1503 and 1504.

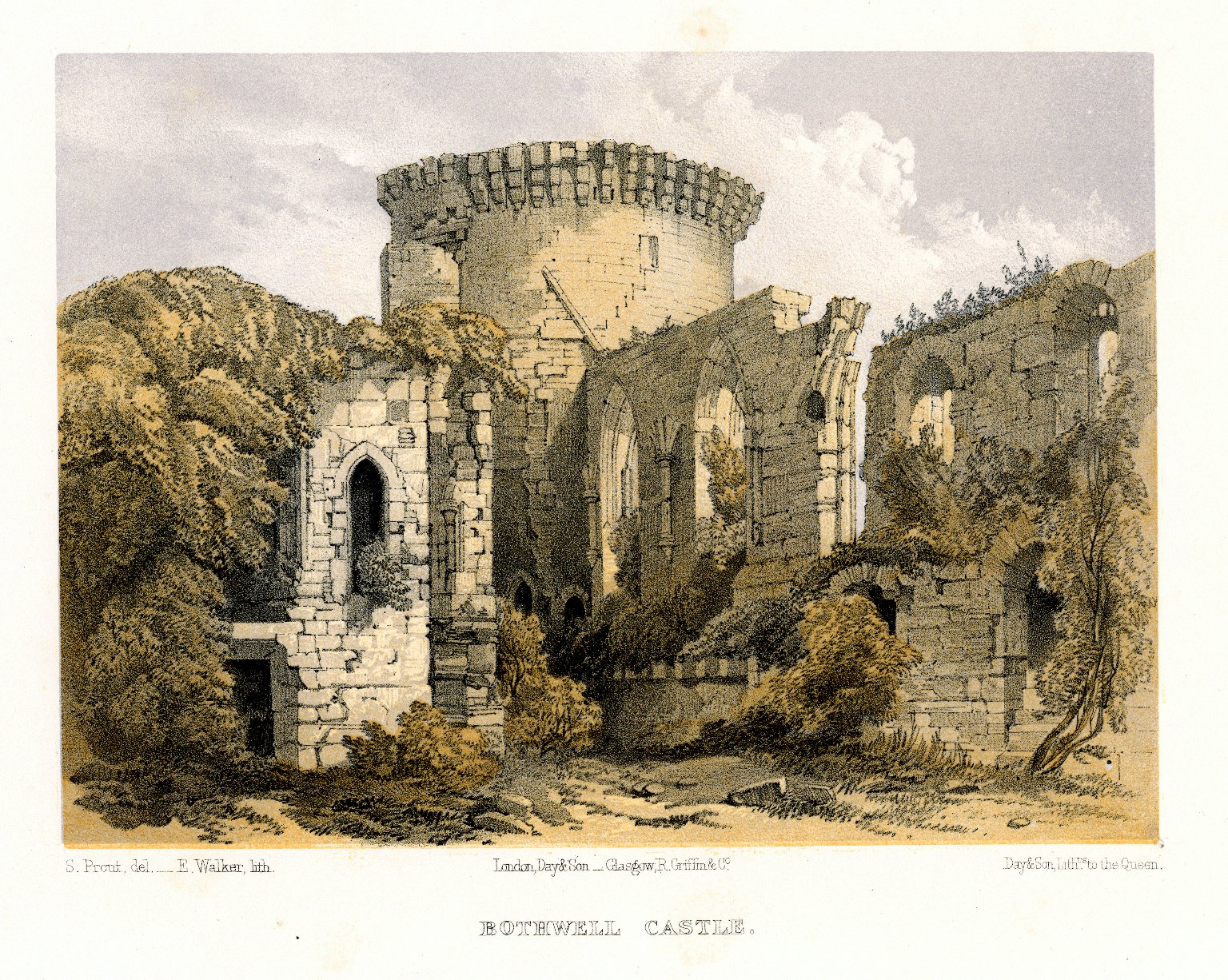
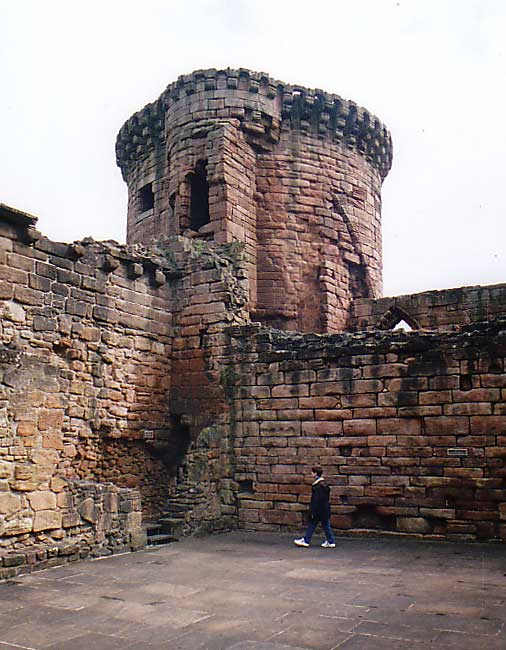
South East Tower seen from inside the roofless Great Hall in the mid-19th century (left) and in 1997 (right).

Bothwell thus reverted to the Douglases, and descended through the Earls of Angus and Marquesses of Douglas to the Earls of Forfar. Archibald Douglas, 1st Earl of Forfar, began construction of a new mansion nearby, demolishing the castle's north-east tower for its stone. (His house was demolished in 1926 due to mining subsidence in the area). After the death of the 2nd Earl at Sheriffmuir in 1715, the castle reverted to the senior line of the Douglas family, represented by the 1st Duke of Douglas and his heirs. The castle then descended to the Earls of Home. In 1935 the 13th Earl gave Bothwell into state care. It is now managed by Historic Environment Scotland as a scheduled monument, and was open to the public (with admission charge) until the castle was closed in 2020 due to safety issues.

== Design ==
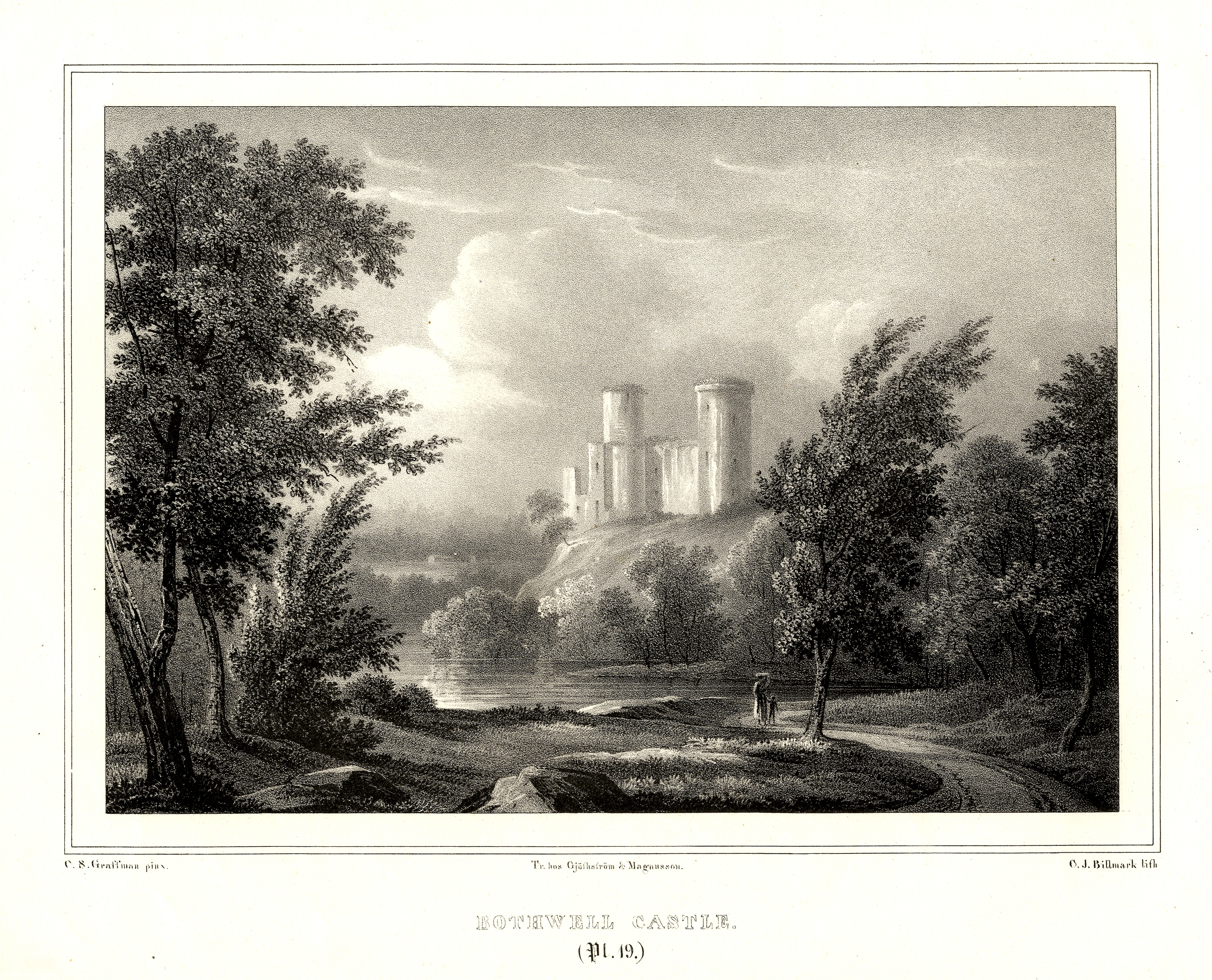
Litographic image of Bothwell Castle from 1833.

While the castle was never completed to its original design, its design is similar to the strongholds of Coucy, Kildrummy and Dirleton as it has a round keep (or donjon). The keep, while currently in ruins, was originally 82 feet (25 m) high and 62 feet (19 m) in diameter with walls which were 15 feet (4.6 m) thick. Thick walls and a powerful gatehouse were later added to the structure and the castle was considered "one of the most important military strongholds in Scotland".

== Popular culture ==
The castle features in the 1810 novelThe Scottish Chiefs by Jane Porter.
