= Gervase Avenel =

Gervase Avenel (died 1219), Lord of Eskdale and Abercorn was a 12th-13th century noble. He served as Justiciar in Lothian between 1206 until 1215 and served as Constable of Roxburgh Castle. He was a son of Robert Avenel and Sybil. Gervase was buried in the Chapter House of Melrose Abbey.

== Marriage and issue ==
Gervase married Sybil, of unknown parentage, and is known to have the following issue:

- Gervase Avenel
- Roger Avenel (died 1243)
- John Avenel
- Robert Avenel
