= William I, Earl of Ross =

Mormaer of Ross

Coat of arms of the Earls of Ross

William I, Earl of Ross (Gaelic: Uilleam; died 1274) was ruler of the province of Ross in northern Scotland.

== Biography ==
William appears as early as 1232, witnessing a charter as the son of Ferquhard, Earl of Ross. He succeeded his father as Earl around 1251. He played a pioneering role in the Scottish reconquest of the Hebrides, which had been under Norwegian control. Indeed, in many ways, he may be regarded as the instigator of Scottish aggression. Hákonar saga Hákonarsonar tells us that in Norway:

"In the previous summer [i.e. that of 1262], letters came east from the Hebrides ... and they brought forward much about the dispeace that the Earl of Ross ... and other Scots, had made in the Hebrides, when they went out to Skye, and burned towns and churches, and slew very many men and women ... They said that the Scottish king intended to lay under himself all the Hebrides." ^{1}

Uilleam's attacks on Norwegian possessions earned him the ire of King Haakon, who planned an expedition against him. However, William escaped this expedition. He was probably rewarded with Skye and Lewis after the Scottish reconquest of the Hebrides, a reward secured when the conquests were ratified by the Treaty of Perth in 1266.

William married Jean Comyn, daughter of William, Earl of Buchan. So far as is known he had only one son, also named William, who succeeded him as Earl. William died in May 1274 at "Earles Allane", likely the site of modern Allanfearn or Allangrange.

== Bibliography ==
- Paul, Sir James, The Scots Peerage, (Edinburgh, 1909) – Internet Archive
- Anderson, Alan Orr, Early Sources of Scottish History: AD 500-1286, 2 Vols (Edinburgh, 1922)
- Brooke, Daphne, Wild Men and Holy Places, (Edinburgh, 1994)
- McDonald, R. Andrew, "Old and new in the far North: Ferchar Maccintsacairt and the early earls of Ross" in Steve Boardman and Alasdair Ross (eds.) The Exercise of Power in Medieval Scotland, c.1200-1500, (Dublin/Portland, 2003)

Preceded by Ferchar mac an tSagairt	Mormaer of Ross; 1251–1274	Succeeded by Uilleam II
