= Inchkeil =

Hamlet

Coordinates: 57.6735427°N 3.4367909°W

Inchkeil is a hamlet in the parish of Duffus, near Elgin, Moray, in the Strathspey region of Scotland.

== History ==
A charter was given to William, son of Freskin from King William I of Scotland, of the lands of Inchkeil between 1165 and 1171. Inchkeil was sold by Alexander Stuart, 5th Earl of Moray to Alexander Sutherland, 1st Lord Duffus in 1653. The estate was purchased by Archibald Dunbar of Northfield who then sold Inchkeil to John Gordon, 16th Earl of Sutherland in 1729.
