= List of listed buildings in Petty, Highland =

This is a list of listed buildings in the parish of Petty in Highland, Scotland.

== List ==
Name	Location	Date Listed	Grid Ref. (Note: Sometimes known as OSGB36, the grid reference (where provided) is based on the British national grid reference system used by the Ordnance Survey. • "Guide to National Grid". Ordnance Survey. • "Get-a-map". Ordnance Survey.)	Geo-coordinates	Notes	LB Number (Note: Historic Environment Scotland assign a unique alphanumeric identifier to each designated site in Scotland, for listed buildings this always begins with "LB", for example "LB12345".)	Image
Flemington House Gate Lodge				57°33′23″N 4°00′17″W	Category C(S)	14930	Upload Photo
(Old) Petty Parish Church Of Scotland, Mausoleum, Burial, Ground And Watch-House				57°31′16″N 4°06′27″W	Category B	14931	Upload Photo
Ardersier Village 2 Stuart Street				57°34′07″N 4°02′18″W	Category C(S)	14928	Upload Photo
Scottack Farm Cartshed With Loft Range Immediately E Of Scottack Farmhouse				57°31′09″N 4°05′56″W	Category B	14934	Upload Photo
Old Manse (Former Petty Parish Church Of Scotland Manse) And Walled Garden				57°31′19″N 4°06′21″W	Category B	14932	Upload Photo
Castle Stuart and Gatepiers				57°31′15″N 4°06′10″W	Category A	17591	Upload another image See more images
Tornagrain, Old Manse (Former Free Church Manse) And Steading				57°31′20″N 4°03′37″W	Category C(S)	14935	Upload Photo
Ardersier Village Old Toll House				57°33′40″N 4°02′22″W	Category B	14927	Upload another image
Flemington House				57°33′21″N 4°00′04″W	Category B	14929	Upload Photo
Scottack Farmhouse				57°31′08″N 4°05′58″W	Category C(S)	14933	Upload Photo

== Key ==
The scheme for classifying buildings in Scotland is:

- Category A: "buildings of national or international importance, either architectural or historic; or fine, little-altered examples of some particular period, style or building type."
- Category B: "buildings of regional or more than local importance; or major examples of some particular period, style or building type, which may have been altered."
- Category C: "buildings of local importance; lesser examples of any period, style, or building type, as originally constructed or moderately altered; and simple traditional buildings which group well with other listed buildings."

In March 2016 there were 47,288 listed buildings in Scotland. Of these, 8% were Category A, and 50% were Category B, with the remaining 42% being Category C.

== See also ==
- List of listed buildings in Highland
