= William Moray of Bothwell =

13th-century Scottish noble

William de Moray
- Lord of Bothwell
- Died: c. 1300
- Noble family: de Moray family
- Father: Walter de Moray

William de Moray (Note: Also known as: William de Moravia or le rich) (died c. 1300), Pantler of Scotland, Lord of Bothwell, Walston and Smailholm, was a Scottish noble.

He was a son of Walter de Moray. His younger brother Andrew de Moray, was Justiciar of Scotia. He provided homage to Edward I of England in 1292 and 1296 and held the position of Pantler of Scotland. William died without issue around 1300. He was succeeded by his great-nephew Andrew.
