= David McDowall-Grant =

Scottish naval officer (1761–1841)

David McDowall Grant (20 July 1761 – 27 June 1841), of Arndilly, Banff and Barr House, Lochwinnoch, was a Scottish naval officer, collector of customs and, briefly, Member of Parliament.

He was the 5th surviving son of William McDowall, Member of Parliament for Renfrewshire from 1768 to 1774, and Elizabeth Graham. His eldest brother, William McDowall, was also a Member of Parliament for Renfrewshire, Ayrshire and the Glasgow Burghs, and another elder brother, Hay MacDowall was a Lieutenant General and General Officer Commanding, Ceylon . In 1790 he married Eleanor Mary, daughter and heir of Col. Alexander Grant of Arndilly, taking the additional name of Grant.

He was returned as Member of Parliament for Banffshire in 1795 following the resignation of Sir James Grant, but is not recorded as having spoken or voted, and did not seek election at the 1796 general election.

He entered the navy around 1778, and was promoted to lieutenant in 1781, retiring as a commander in 1816. In 1782 he took part under Admiral Rodney in the defeat of the French fleet at the Battle of the Saintes near St Lucia in the West Indies.

He served as Collector of customs, Kingston, Jamaica from 1810 until around 1836.

He is recorded on a plaque in the former church at Boharm.

Parliament of Great Britain
Preceded by Sir James Grant	Member of Parliament for Banffshire; 1795–1796	Succeeded by Sir William Grant
