= Freskin =

12th-century Flemish nobleman, Founder of the Clans Sutherland and Murray

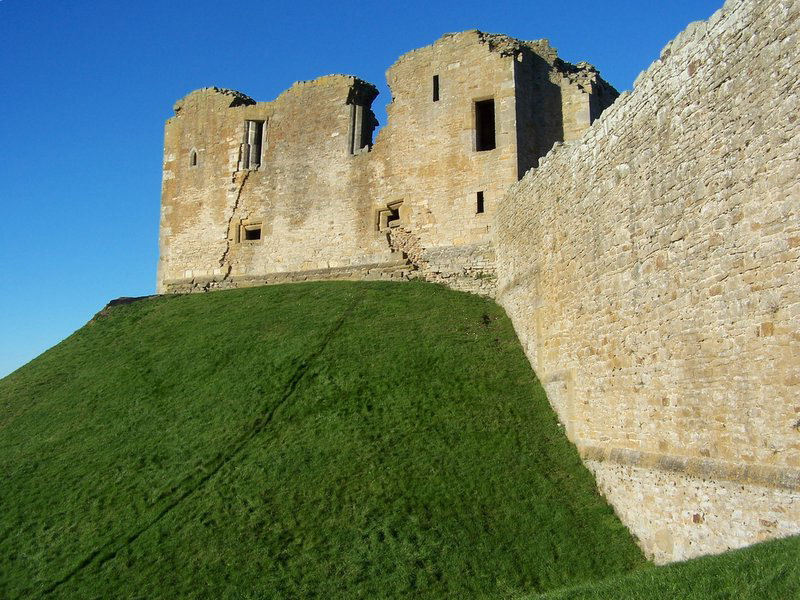
Duffus Castle, possibly begun by Freskin.

Freskin (died before 1171) was a Flemish nobleman who settled in Scotland during the reign of King David I, becoming the progenitor of the Murray and Sutherland families, and possibly others.

== Origins ==
Freskin was said to have come to the Lowlands of Scotland from Flanders, and thence to Moray in the north. From a charter granted to one of his sons by King William the Lion, it can be ascertained that Freskin held from King David the lands of Strathbrock in West Lothian, as well as Duffus, Roseisle, Inchikel, Machir and Kintrae in Moray. The name Freskin is Flemish, and in the words of Geoffrey Barrow "it is virtually certain that Freskin belonged to a large group of Flemish settlers who came to Scotland in the middle decades of the 12th century and were chiefly to be found in West Lothian and the valley of the Clyde". Freskin was one of several Flemings who had lands in Moray bestowed upon him; this seems to have been an attempt by the kings of Scotland to replace the native Gaelic nobility, who had resisted their rule and prevented them forming a cohesive kingdom, most notably in the 1130 uprising led by Angus, Earl of Moray.

== Issue ==
Rupert Ferguson claims that Freskin married a woman claiming descent from the old Picto-Moravian royal dynasty as a means of legitimising his claim to the lands he had been granted. He probably had only one son, William. It is sometimes said that he had two others, Hugh and Andrew, but these may in fact have been sons of William. William inherited his father's lands and took the name de Moravia, or "of Moray" in English. The Moray or Murray family became prolific in Scotland, and their chief now holds the title Duke of Atholl. Hugh, one of William's sons, acquired a large tract of land in Sutherland. His son, William, took the surname Sutherland, and was created Earl of that region in the 1230s, a title which is still held by his descendants today.

The connection between the Murrays and Sutherlands is shown by the similarity of their arms: the Murrays bear azure, three stars argent and the Sutherlands bear gules, three stars or.

== The Douglas connection ==
Comparison between Douglas and Murray arms

It is also quite possible that the house of Douglas descends from Freskin's family. Bricius de Douglas, son of William, Lord of Douglas, became Bishop of Moray in 1203. A man named Freskin of Kerdal is found amongst the benefactors of Spynie Cathedral, and Bricius refers to him as his uncle. The parentage of Freskin of Kerdal is not known, but he was likely a descendant (possibly a grandson) of the original Freskin. The connection is further supported by the similarity of the families' arms: both bear three silver stars on blue, in varying arrangements. Belief in the common descent of the Murrays and Douglases was certainly extant in the early 15th century:

Off Murrawe and the Douglas,
How that thare begynnyng was,
Syn syndry spekis syndryly,
I can put that in na story.
Bot in thare armeys bath thai bere
The sternys [stars] set in lyke manere:
Til mony men it is yhit sene
Apperand lyk, that thai had bene
Off kyn be descens lyneale,
Or be branchys collateralle.

== See also ==
- Lambroughton - Friskin and the origin of Clan Cunninghame.
- Andrew of Wyntoun
