= Gauldwell Castle =

Ruined 13th-century castle in Moray, Scotland

- Near Dufftown, Moray, Scotland

Location
- Coordinates: 57.4911°N 3.1512°W

Site history
- Built: 13th century

Gauldwell Castle was a 13th-century castle about 3.5 miles (5.6 km) north-west of Dufftown, Moray, Scotland, north of the River Fiddich. Alternative names are Boharm Castle, Cauddwell Castle, Gallvall Castle and Goldwell Castle.

== History ==
Freskin, a Flemish nobleman, progenitor of the Murrays of Abercairny, held the castle. It became a property of the Earls of Moray. In 1562 Mary, Queen of Scots stayed at the castle. An earlier castle may have stood on the site.

== Structure ==
Gauldwell Castle was a large enclosure castle. There was a wall enclosing a courtyard, with a hall; alterations and extensions took place during the period of its use. The castle was built at the south of a ridge which sloped steeply to the east and west, though gently to the south. The building was 38.5 metres (126 ft) long by 8.3 metres (27 ft) wide to the north, and 6.9 metres (23 ft) wide at the south. The west wall, 2.5 metres (8 ft 2 in) thick, survives to a height of 6.5 metres (21 ft) in places. The area of the probable courtyard is to the east.

== See also ==
- Castles in Great Britain and Ireland
- List of castles in Scotland
