= Walter Olifard (died 1242) =

Scottish noble

Walter de Olifard
- Died: 1242
- Buried: Melrose Abbey
- Noble family: Olifard family

Sir Walter de Olifard (died 1242), Lord of Bothwell and Abernethy and Justiciar of Lothian, was a Scottish noble.

== Life ==
Olifard was the eldest son of Walter de Olifard and Christiana de Strathearn. He was known as the younger to distinguish between his father. Walter held the office of Justiciar of Lothian between 1221 and 1242. He founded a church at Ormiston, near Bothwell dedicated to Saint Catherine.

== Marriage and issue ==
His spouse was known at his death as Isabella. He is known to have had the following known issues:

- William de Olifard, married Isabel Douglas, had issue.
- Hugh de Olifard
- Walter de Olifard
- A daughter, who married Walter de Moravia (also known as Walter de Moray), who succeeded Walter de Olifard as the Lord of Bothwell.
