= Arndilly House =

House in Moray, Scotland

Coordinates: 57.5085°N 3.1857°W

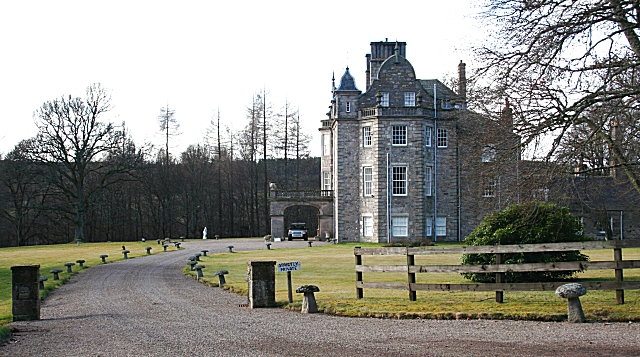
Arndilly House in 2008

Arndilly House is a 1770 house in Banffshire, Scotland, in the parish of Boharm. It lies between the River Spey and Ben Aigan.

It was remodelled in both 1826 and 1850.

It is a category A listed building with Historic Scotland.

It was remodelled in the Scots baronial style in 1850 by the Aberdeen architect James Matthews.

It was the seat of the MacDowall Grant family in the 18th and 19th centuries, including David McDowall-Grant.

On the 11th. December, 2015, The Telelegraph Newspaper reported in actress Beth Rogan's obituary that she and Shell plc heir and publisher Tony Samuel, after marrying at Chelsea Register Office in 1962, divided their time between London and her husband's family home of Arndilly House, but that Samuel was inclined to be irascible, so they divorced in 1965.
