= Eskdale (Scotland) =

Valley in Dumfries and Galloway, Scotland

- Glen
- Location within Scotland
- Coordinates: 55.189°N 3.068°W
- Grid position: NY345895
- Location: Scotland

Eskdale (Scottish Gaelic: Eisgeadal, IPA: [ˈeʃkʲət̪əl̪ˠ]) is a glen and former lordship in the county of Dumfriesshire, Scotland. The River Esk flows through Eskdale to its estuary at the Solway Firth.

In 1620, when 13 continuous days of snow occurred in Scotland, on Eskdale Moor only 35 of a flock of 20,000 sheep survived.

== Notable persons ==
- Robert Avenel (d. 1185), ruler of the small former Northumbrian province.
- Earls of Douglas, feudal lords, with the title forfeited in 1455.
- John Alexander Ewart (1821–1904), British military leader, who had his family home in the area.
- John Malcolm (1769–1833), major-general and statesman, was born in the area.
- Thomas Telford (1757–1834), Scottish civil engineer, was born in the area.
