= Robert Avenel =

Anglo-Norman magnate

Robert Avenel (died 8 March 1185) was a 12th-century Anglo-Norman magnate. He was ruler of the small former Northumbrian province of Eskdale in Dumfriesshire, as well as Abercorn in West Lothian. He was one of a small number of Anglo-Norman immigrants to have been given a provincial lordship in southern Scotland in the early-to-mid 12th century. For some period in the 1170s he served as Justiciar in Lothian (along with three others). He also had some part of the township of Innerwick. He seems to have held this of Walter fitz Alan. He passed this on to his younger son Vincent. His nephew Glai or Glay may have held part of Innerwick too.

He died on 8 March 1185, according to the Chronicle of Melrose

Robert Avenel, our novice-associate, died on the eighth day before the Ides of March. He gave to God, and to St Mary and the monks of Melrose, his land of Eskdale, as his charter testifies; may his blessed soul ever live in glory.

He had entered the monastery of Melrose shortly before his death. He had three sons, by his wife Sybil, Gervase, Vincent and Robert, the latter of whom became a clerk. Gervase was Robert's principal heir, and the latter also served as Justiciar of Lothian.

Robert had a daughter who was a concubine of William the Lion, king of the Scots. The king and Robert Avenel's daughter had a daughter named Isabella, who was given as wife in 1183 to Robert III de Brus, son of Robert II de Brus, lord of Annandale. After her husband died in 1191, she was married to the Yorkshire Anglo-Norman Robert, Baron de Ros (died 1226).
