= Arndilly =

Coordinates: 57°30′32.07″N 3°11′16.49″W

Arndilly is a place and former parish in Moray, Scotland. The parish was united with the parish of Boharm in 1618. The name was previously Ardintullie, Artyldole and Artendol.

The parish church remains were incorporated into Arndilly House, built in 1770.
