= Boharm =

Rural parish in the Speyside area of north Scotland

Coordinates: 57°30′50″N 3°07′02″W

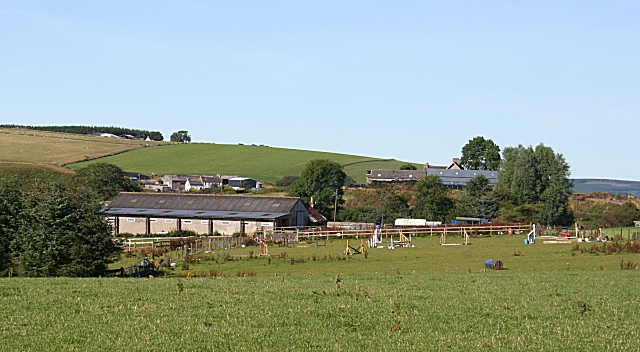
Boharm

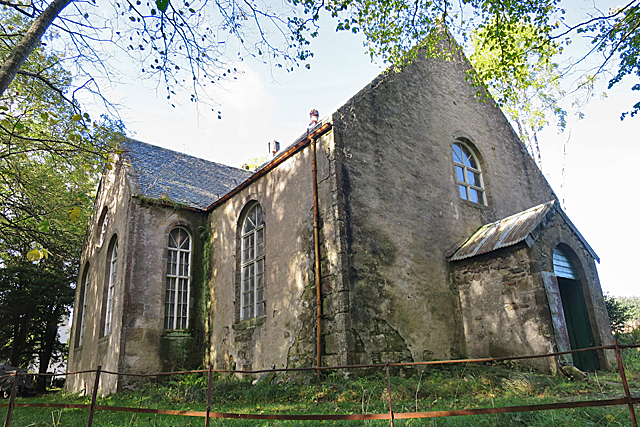
Old Boharm Church

Boharm (Scottish Gaelic: Both Sheirm or Both a' Chàirn) is a rural parish in the Speyside area of north Scotland, midway between Aberlour and Fochabers, and north of Dufftown. It lies on minor roads to either side of the A95. The main settlements in the parish are Maggieknockater and Mulben.

Despite its tiny size it is linked to two men who have been Moderator of the General Assembly, the highest position in the Church of Scotland.

A distinctly rural parish it consists mainly of farm estates and has no village centre as such. The parish has an area of 68.4 km^{2} (26.4 sq mi).

== History ==
The settlement was originally called Bocharin, meaning a bow-shape around a cairn or rocky hill, the hill in question being Ben Aigan, east of the River Spey and Rothes.

In his article on the parish for the Statistical Account of Scotland, 1791–9, Rev Lewis Forbes describes it thus:

The length, between the parish of Mortlich, at the west, and the parish of Bellie, at the east, is from 7 to 9 English miles; the breadth, from the parish of Botriphnie, at the south, to the highest cultivated land on the mountain, northward, is from 2 to 3 English miles; but the figure of the parish is so irregular, that these measures are to be regarded as the mean, rather than the particular length and breadth.

The general appearance of the country may be conceived as an extensive valley from east to west, having all the arable land hanging on the declivities of both sides, there being little or no plain on the banks of the brooks, which, rising in the hills, bend their courses to either hand; to Fiddich, on the west; and, by the east, turning by the north-west to Spey. From this general description, Airndilly, the seat of David M‘Dowall Grant, Esq; falls to be excepted, being delightfully situated on a rising ground, above a pretty extensive plain, half encircled by the Spey, in the south-western end of the parish, near to which, a little farther down the river, lie the haughs of Kailymore, a part of the same estate, signifying the great wood; which epithet, in some degree, it still comparatively merits. The soil here is sandy, warm, and fertile; but, in general, over the rest of the parish, it is a stiff, rich, deep clay, generally on a bed of limestone, and very retentive of water, with which it is too frequently supplied, the summit of the mountain attracting or intercepting the clouds borne along from the ocean by the north and north-westerly winds, on which account the harvests are rather late; and, though the air be moist, yet there is no distemper generally prevalent.

The historical population has never been more than 1500 and fell below 1000 between the world wars.

Mary, Queen of Scots came to Boharm in 1562. She was travelling from Aberdeen to Elgin and on to Inverness Castle from Aberdeen, and crossed the River Spey at "Bowame" by ferry boat. The boat cost 40 shillings and her almoner gave money poor folk in Boharm. There was a wayside Hospital dedicated to St Nicholas at Boat o'Brig, a Spey crossing where there had been a wooden bridge in the middle ages.

== Churches ==
In Pre-Reformation times the parish and three chapels connected to three different estates: St Nicholas at Boat of Brigg; the chapel at Galival (Gaildwell); and the chapel at Artendol (Arndilly). St Nicholas dated from pre-1232 but was removed when a bridge was built in 1830. The Chapel of Galival dated from pre-1222 and was built by William de Moravia. The burial ground was used until 1740. Arndilly House was built on the site of the third chapel.

In 1618 a new parish church and burial ground was established at the expense of King James VI about 2 miles to the north east, near Maggieknockater. Gravestones in the churchyard date from 1692 onwards.

In 1783 the adjacent parish of Dundurcas was annexed to Boharm by the Court of Teinds, except for the lands of Aikenway, which were transferred to Rothes. The 1618 church fell into disuse in 1793, when a new church was constructed near the centre of the new enlarged parish. Portions of the east wall substantially remodelled (possibly by William Robertson of Elgin) in earlier 19th century as a burial enclosure for families of Arndilly and Auchlunkart who are commemorated by mural plaques.

The 1793 church was a simple rectangular building, with porches and a vestry added by William Robertson in 1828. The building, originally listed in 1972 as Category B, was recategorised in 1988 as C(S)

In 1946 Boharm Parish church united with the former United Free Church congregation of Boharm Mulben. In 1970 a link was established with Botriphnie, with one minister serving both parishes. The 1793 building ceased to be used for worship in 1974, with the former Free Church in Mulben (built around 1850) being used thereafter.

In 1983 Boharm was united with Keith North and Newmill to form Keith North Newmill and Boharm. The Church building in Mulben ceased to be used around 1987, following the discovery of structural problems, and has since been converted to flats. The Church now meets in Mulben Hall once a month

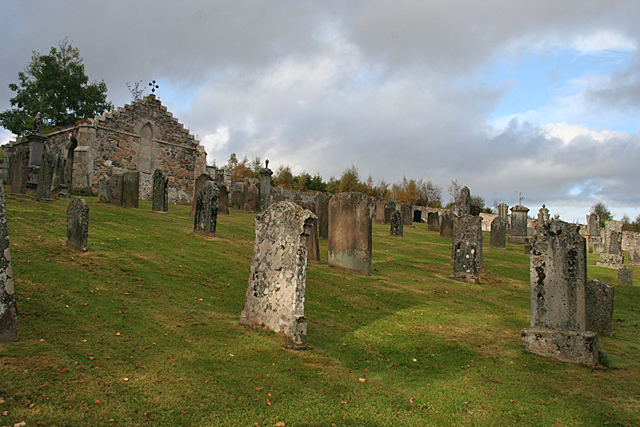
Boharm Parish Kirkyard

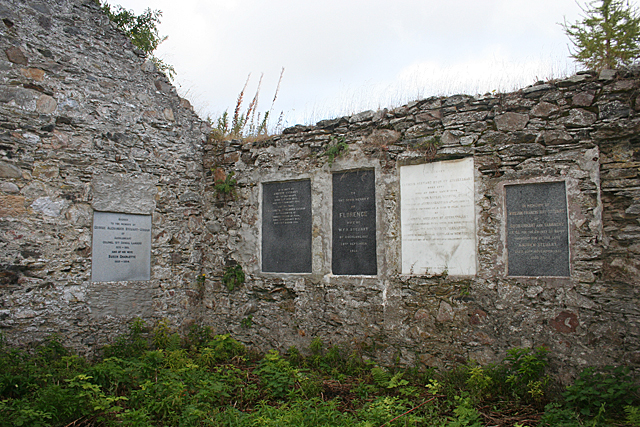
Interior of 1618 Kirk

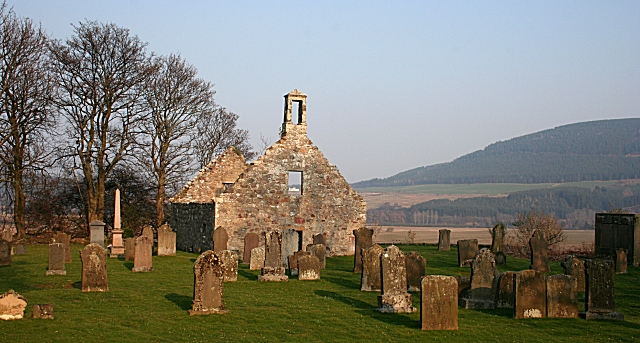
Dundurcas Kirk

=== Ministers ===
The Fasti Ecclesiae Scoticanae lists the following as Ministers of Arndilly or Boharm-

- 1567 William Keithie (or Keith)
- 1568 William Peterkin
- 1574 George Collie
- 1617 Thomas Anderson
- 1623 George Fraser
- 1634 Thomas Law
- 1646 John Ray
- 1654 William Harper
- 1686 Adam Harper
- 1717 George Gordon
- 1729 John Gilchrist
- 1734 George Grant
- 1753 Thomas Johnston
- 1784 John Grant (from Dundurcas)
- 1789 Francis Leslie
- 1800 Patrick Forbes
- 1816 Lewis William Forbes
- 1854 Alexander Murdoch
- 1869 Alexander Masson
- 1880 Stephen Ree
- 1918 William McCaig Wightman
- 1924 John Will
- 1958 Adrian Hay Stephen
- 1970 James Souter Stephen (minister of linked charge with Botriphnie)

== Antiquities ==
In the Statistical Account, Rev Forbes writes:

The ruin of the castle of Gallvall is the only remain of any thing that can be deemed antiquity in the parish. It was built fronting the east, on the north side of the valley towards the western end, where the declivity hath fallen more gently into an inclined plain, and shot a promontory into the deep defile, formed by the course of the stream of Alderny; snugly sheltered from the northern blast, with an enlivening extent of arable field, rising behind on either hand; a luxuriant landscape, spread westward on the winding banks of the Fiddich, glittering through the meadows and woods, decorated by the steady battlements of the castles of Balvenie and Auchendown, each on its own green hill, and terminated by the summits of the blue mountains, ranged at a distance around, seeming to debar all irruption upon the sequestered vales. It bore little resemblance to the other castles of the feudal lords, whose towers, or square or round, of various height and form, projected for the protection of the intermediate walls. It appears to have been a simple structure of an 119 by 24 feet within, divided by an internal wall, so as to form two halls on the ground floor, one 65, and the other 54 feet in length. The windows were only 20 inches wide, though the walls were 8 feet thick, built up in frames of timber, for keeping the fluid mortar which was poured into the dry stone-wall, when raised to a certain height. The front and corners were neatly finished with free-stone from the quarries of Duffus, at the distance of 20 miles, on the other side of Spey, the nearest where such stone could have been procured. The front and gables are now entirely broken down; but, within these 50 years, they stood to the height of several stories. About that period, several silver spoons were found among the rubbish, having the handle round, and hollow like a pipe; and the concave part, or shell, perfectly circular.

This bulky fabric, which on the eastern front had lower external accommodations, in the year 1200 was denominated Castellum de Bucharin. It then belonged to the Freskyns of Duffus, by whom it was no doubt built...

It is also the charter of Moray instructed, that, between the year 1203 and 1222, William, the son of William Freskyn, obtained the consent of Brucius, Bishop of Moray, for building a domestic chapel, for the more commodious performance of the offices of devotion. It stood on its own consecrated burying-ground, forsaken only in the course of the last 60 years, about 50 yards from the north end of the castle; and, though only 24 by 12 feet within, must have been the parent of the present parish church, which, with several others, was erected at the private expence of James VI. For civilizing the north of Scotland, in the year 1618, at which period the parish of Airndilly may be supposed to have been annexed.

The Castle, listed as "Cauddwell Castle", is a Scheduled Ancient Monument

== Demographics ==
Year	Population	Population Change
1801	1,161	-
1811	1,190	+2.50%
1821	1,206	+1.34%
1831	1,385	+14.84%
1841	1,261	-8.95%
1851	1,368	+8.49%
1881	1,191	-12.94%
1901	1,128	-5.29%
1911	990	-12.23%
1921	865	-12.63%
1931	804	-7.05%
1951	665	-17.29%
2011	534	-19.70%

== Memorials ==
In the First World War Boharm lost 32 men (mainly farm-workers). The memorial to their memory stands on the A95 near Mulben. Seven further parishioners were killed in the Second World War.

== Notable residents ==
- Rev Lewis William Forbes minister of Boharm in the mid 19th century Moderator of the General Assembly of the Church of Scotland in 1852
- Rev Patrick Forbes minister of Boharm around 1810 Moderator of the General Assembly of the Church of Scotland in 1829
- William Watson Smith WW1 air ace
- Rev William Morrison (1827-1885) Free Church minister of the parish from 1856 to 1885.
