= Justiciar of Lothian =

The Justiciar of Lothian (in Norman-Latin, Justiciarus Laudonie) was an important legal office in the High Medieval Kingdom of Scotland.

The Justiciars of Lothian were responsible for the administration of royal justice in the province of Lothian, a much larger area than the modern Lothian, covering Scotland south of the Forth and Clyde, outwith Galloway, which had its own Justiciar of Galloway and the lands north of the River Forth and River Clyde by the Justiciar of Scotia. The institution may date to the reign of King David I (died 1153), whose godson David Olifard was the first attested Justiciar. The Justiciars of Lothian, although not magnates of the stature of the typical Justiciar of Scotia, were significant landowners and not creatures of the kings.

== List of Justiciars of Lothian, (incomplete) ==
- David Olifard (c.1165–c.1170)
- Robert Avenel, Richard Comyn, Robert de Quincy, Geoffrey de Melville (c.1170xc.1178)
- Walter Olifard the Elder (c.1178–c.1188)
- William de Lindsay of Crawford (1189–1199)
- Patrick I, Earl of Dunbar (d. 1232) (c.1195–c.1205)
- David de Lindsay of Crawford and Gervase Avenel (c.1206–c.1215?)
- Alexander de Stirling, Sheriff of Stirling and Walter Lindsay, Sheriff of Berwick (c.1206–c.1215?)
- Walter Olifard the Younger (d. 1242) (c.1221–1242)
- David de Lindsay of the Byres (1242–1249x1251)
- William Olifard (Witnesses a charter in 1247 as Justiciar of the Lothians)
- David de Graham of Dundaff, deputy (1248, 1253)
- Alan Durward, Knt.(1250),
- Thomas de Normanville (c.1251–1253x1255)
- Walter de Moray of Petty (1255x1257)
- Hugh Barclay (1258)
- Thomas de Normanville and Stephen Fleming (1259)
- Stephen Fleming (c.1260)
- Hugh de Berkeley (c1261 - after Feb 1275-6)
- William de Soules (d. 1292x1293) (c.1279–1292x1293)
- Geoffrey de Mowbray (1294–1296?)
- Adam de Gordon and John de Lisle (1305–1306)
- Alexander Lindsay of Barnweill (-1309)
- David Lindsay
- James Douglas (c.1314-c.1318)
- Sir Robert de Lawedre of The Bass (d. Sept 1337) (served bef. Sept 1319 till death)
- Sir Walter Oliphant of Gask, Knt. After 1337.
- William Douglas, 1st Earl of Douglas (1371-1384)
- Sir Robert de Lawedre of The Bass (d.1451) from 1425 till death.
