= Over, Cambridgeshire =

Village in Cambridgeshire, England

Coordinates: 52.314°N 0.016°E

Over
- Location within Cambridgeshire
- Population: 2,862 (2011)
- OS grid reference: TL375703
- Shire county: Cambridgeshire
- Region: East
- Country: England
- Sovereign state: United Kingdom
- Post town: CAMBRIDGE
- Postcode district: CB24
- Dialling code: 01954
- Website: overvillage.co.uk

Over is a large village near the River Great Ouse in the English county of Cambridgeshire, just east of the prime meridian.

The parish covers an area of approximately 2,535 acres (1,026 ha). It is ten miles (16 km) east of the town of Huntingdon and is also ten miles (16 km) northwest from the city of Cambridge.

Over contains the basic village facilities, including a primary school, shop, one public house (the Admiral Vernon) and St. Mary's Church. In recent years, the village has expanded rapidly, with the inclusion of several housing estates, a community and conference centre and modern sporting facilities. An Over day centre was set up in 1989 by Pamela Cressey. The Over Community Centre was set up with National Lottery funding of almost £1 million in 1999.

Over is mentioned in the poem "The Old Vicarage, Grantchester", by Rupert Brooke.

== History ==
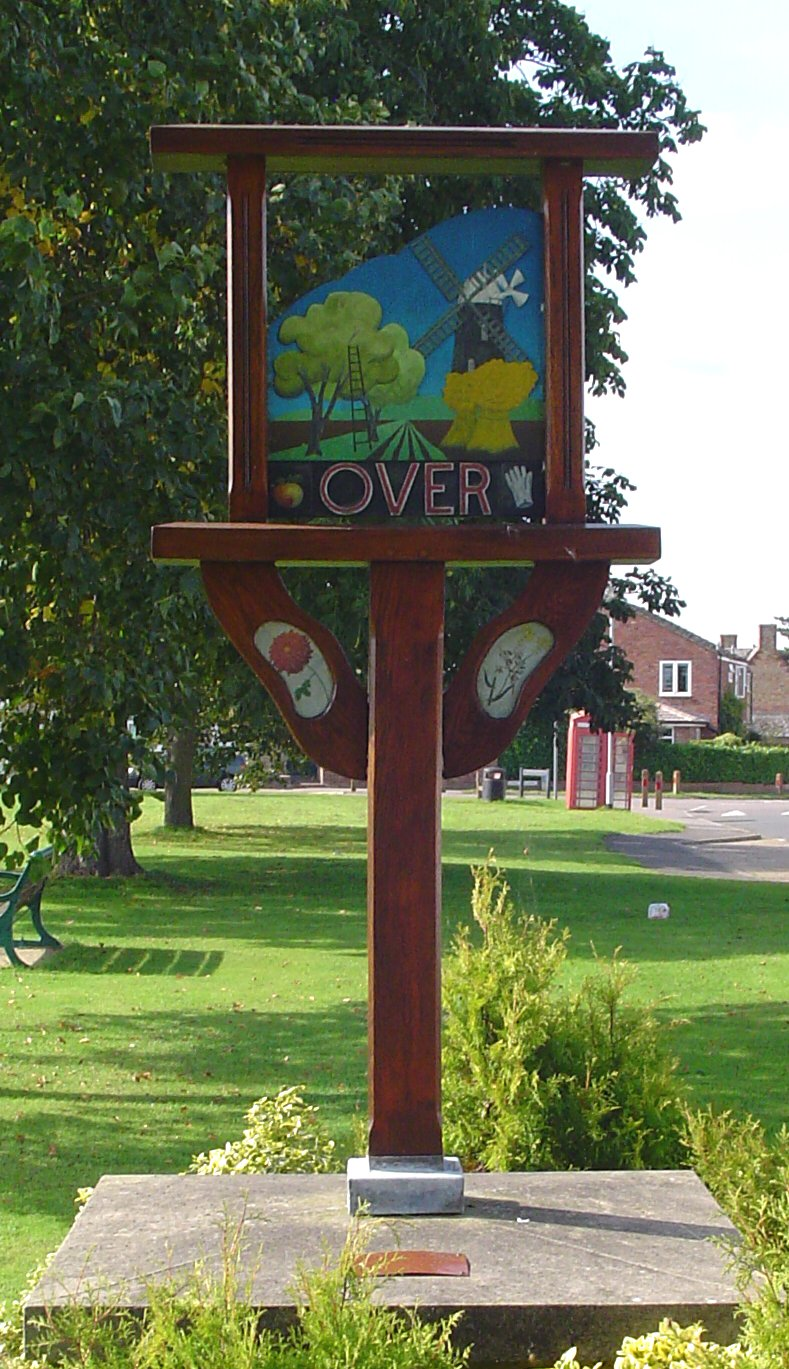
Village sign in Over

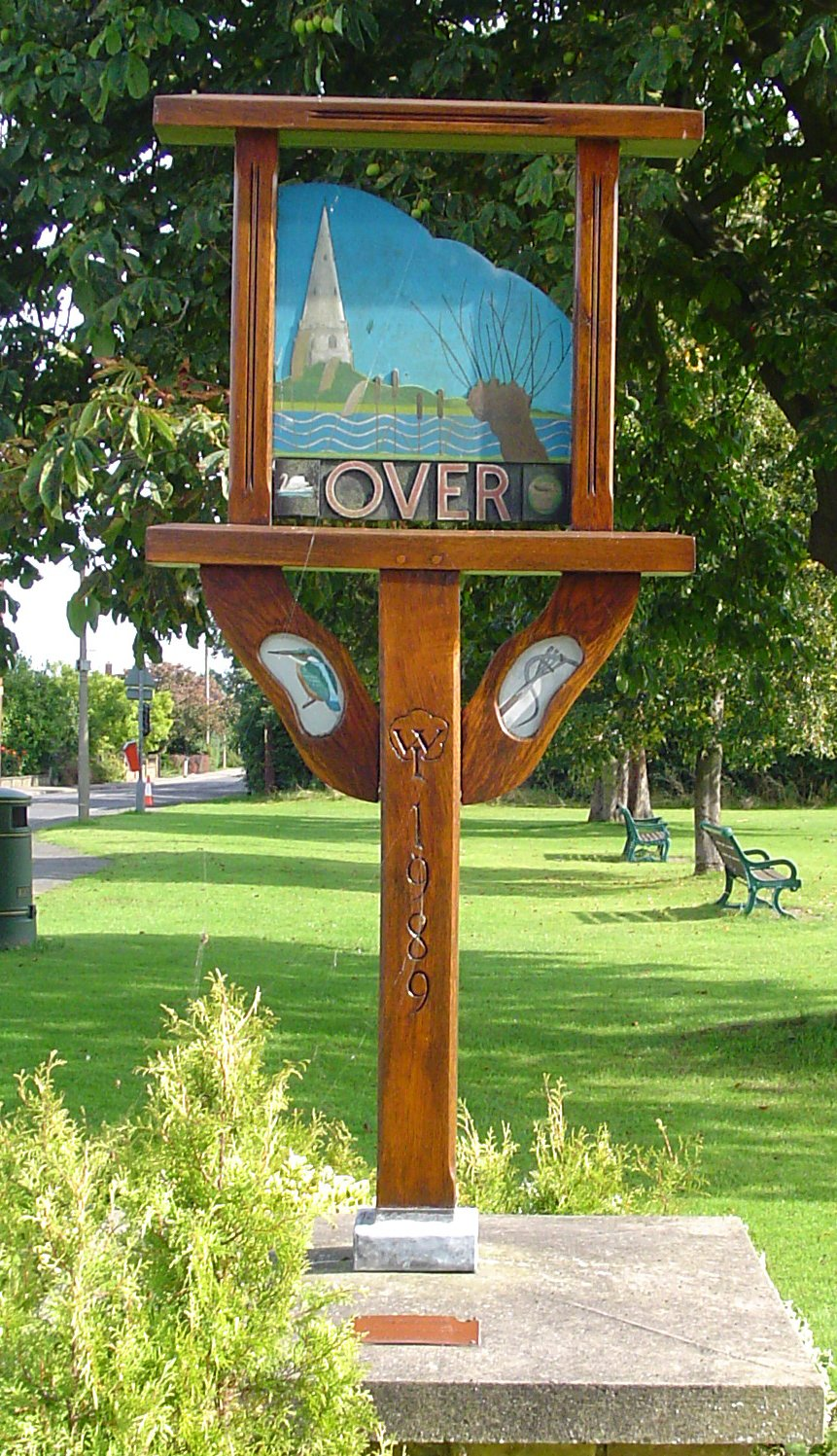
Another village sign in Over

By 1628 the fens and meres to the north of the settlement were enclosed, as was the rest of the village land by 1837.

Originally, there were two distinct settlements. One was at Church End around St Mary's Parish Church, the other at Over End – the south-eastern part of the village around West street.

When it comes to buildings, Over is a village full of contrast both in terms of age and designs. Although the exact date is unknown, a row of old thatched cottages on the north side of the High Street were burned to the ground during a fire started by an arsonist. These were replaced by the large Victorian houses which feature balconies to the front.

Much of the antiquated property in the village is Victorian, as the majority of the older clunch and wattle cottages have been demolished.

The influence of the Dutch who, under the leadership of the Dutch engineer Cornelius Vermuyden, came to drain the Fens, can be seen in several of Over's older houses – the Old Black Horse in the High Street and the Ivy House in Fen End are the most obvious, with their rounded end-walls and angled brick-ties.

The town hall, in the High Street opposite Overcote Road, has the date MDCCCXLIX (1849) carved over the door.

Apart from the parish church, the oldest remaining structure in Over now is believed to be the wall running down Fen End from the Willingham Road corner. The small patch of wall, now incorporated into newer brickwork, was believed by Ernie Papworth to have stood for over 500 years.

== St Mary's Church ==
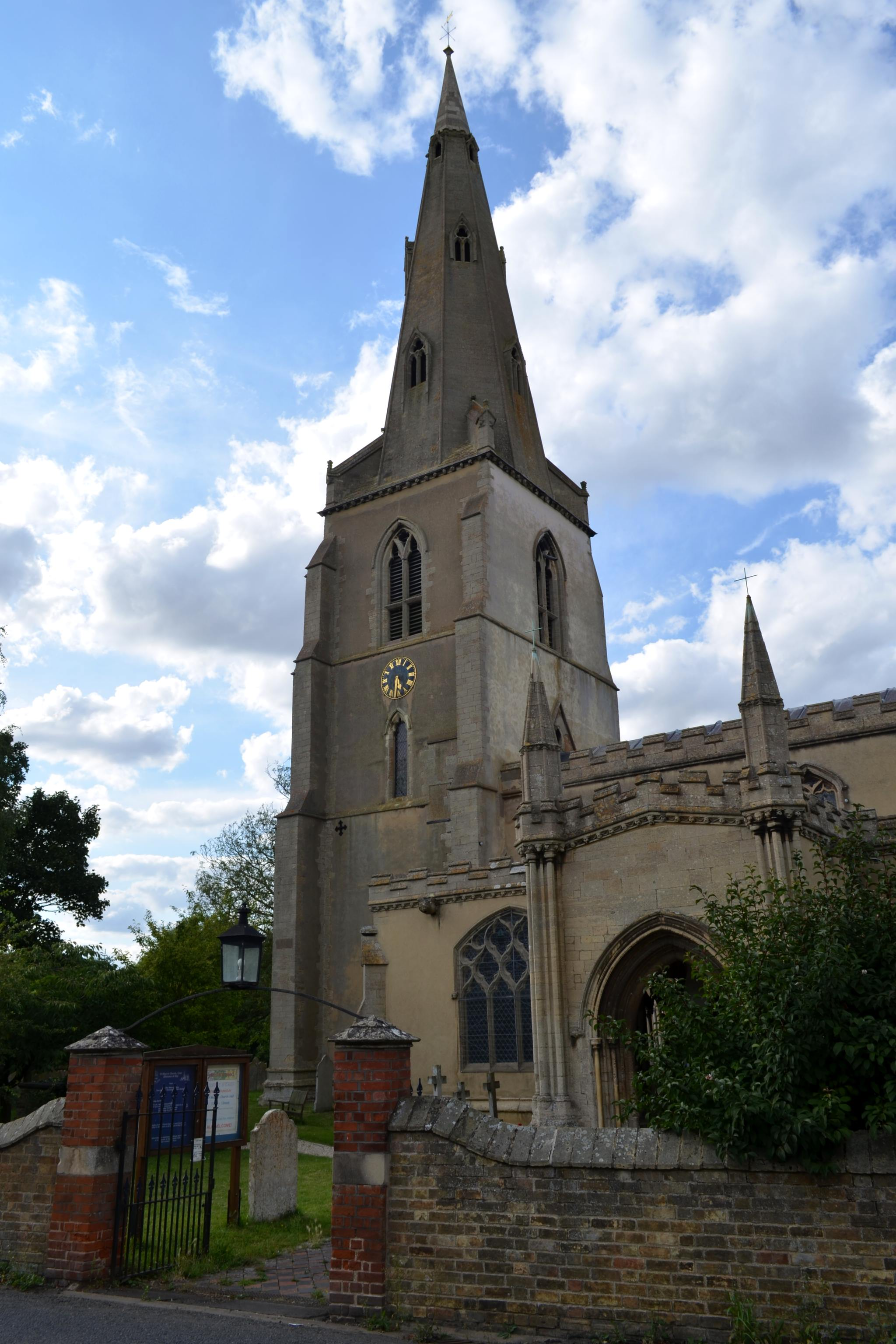
St Mary's Church, Over in July 2014

St Mary's Church is made almost entirely of stone from Barnack, in the extreme north of Cambridgeshire. It has traces of 14th century work, including flower-ball carvings, gargoyles representing birds and beasts, and a south porch of perfect proportions.

Its size reflects the significant income the village received from, among other things, the Suffolk wool trade and goods sold in the market at St Ives.

Unlike many Fenland and edge-of-fen churches, it is highly ornamented, which is evidence of the amount of money that was available at the time of construction and decoration: the more complicated the work, the more it cost.

There are also two other churches in Over: a Methodist church in the Lanes, which was built in 1848 and features a typical one-storey design found in Methodist churches; and a Baptist church in New Road, built directly onto a house whose owner gave the land for the church to be built in 1737.

== Over today ==
Today's Over is within a part of Cambridgeshire where there is enormous pressure for expansion with new housing and industrial and commercial buildings. The village has seen a number of estates built over the past 30 years. Plans have been approved for limited further growth, most of which is likely to be on small sites dotted around the village. One such development is a new estate, Hazel Green, which was completed by Camstead Homes in 2011.

The village's population in 1951 was 910, rising to 2,420 by 1991.
