= Ben Aigan =

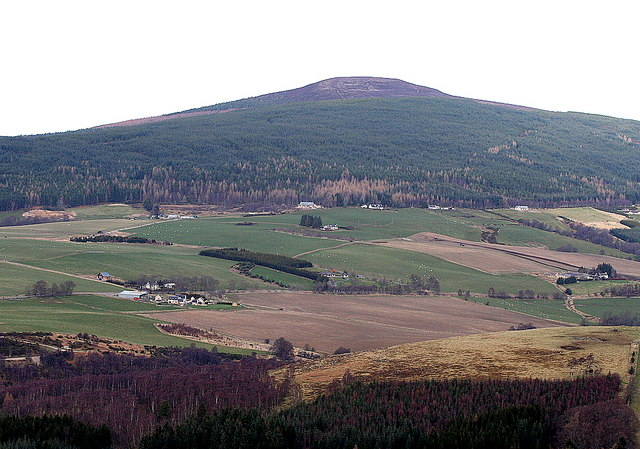
- Ben Aigan

Highest point
- Elevation: 471 m (1,545 ft)
- Prominence: 289 m (948 ft)
- Listing: Marilyn

Geography
- Location: Moray, Scotland
- Topo map: OS Landranger 28

Ben Aigan is a hill in Moray rising to a height of 471m (1546 feet) to the east of the River Spey, which flows along the foot of its western and northern slopes. It lies to the east of Rothes and north east of Craigellachie. The Speyside Way passes over the shoulder of the hill.
