= Kintrae =

Coordinates: 57.6717462°N 3.3831148°W

Kintrae is a hamlet in the parish of Spynie, Moray, Scotland, originally located on the southern shore of Loch Spynie. The name is Celtic, meaning “the top of the tide”.

Kintrae was the site of a church that was already being described as ancient ("veteri ecclesia de Kyntra") in a charter of 1203 to 1222. This was probably connected to nearby Inchagarty ("Island of the Priest"), which lies 0.5 km to the west of Kintrae on a slight rise, and would originally have been an island in the loch.

== History ==
A charter was given to William, son of Freskin from King William I of Scotland, of the lands of Kintrae between 1165 and 1171. Kintrae was sold by Alexander Stuart, 5th Earl of Moray to Alexander Sutherland, 1st Lord Duffus in 1653. The estate was purchased by Archibald Dunbar of Northfield who then sold Kintrae to John Gordon, 16th Earl of Sutherland in 1729.
