= David Olifard =

First recorded Justiciar

Sir David Olifard (c.1113/1117 – c. 1170) was the first recorded Justiciar (of the Lothians), governing the southern half of Scotland south of the rivers Forth and Clyde (excluding Galloway). Olifard was godson to King David I of Scotland, whose life he saved at the Rout of Winchester in 1141. Olifard is the first documented chief of Clan Oliphant.

== Personal life ==
Olifard was the brother of William Olifard of Lilford and son of Hugh Olifard of Orton. His mother was Muriel (probably Henred) as she is mentioned with another brother in a charter:- Thomas Olifard grants a half yard in the town of Barton (Barton Seagrave of old Barton Hanred, in Northamptonshire) to the church of St. John of Barton, for the soul of William Olifard his brother, and with consent of Muriel his mother and of Richard de Henred his lord.It was confirmed by Richard de Henred, who calls William Olifard his cognatur.

The Olifards held their lands in England mainly from the Earls of Northampton/Huntingdon. In 1113, King David I of Scotland married Maud, Countess of Huntingdon, widow of Simon de St. Liz. Thus King David held the earldoms during the lifetime of his wife. David Olifard was godson of his namesake, the current earl, King David I of Scotland. Olifard must therefore have been born after 1113 (and before 1117 – see below).

Olifard's wife is unknown but there is a clue: Olifard granted to the monks of Jedburgh the "tenths" of the mill of Crailing and Berengerias de Engein granted the same monks a mark of silver from the mill of Crailing. Both these grants were confirmed by David I. Whether Berengerius was a father-in-law or brother-in-law to Olifard, we do not know. To have an interest in the mill of Crailing, which Olifard owned, coupled with the fact that Berengerius also made his donation to the same monks to whom Olifard made his donation, suggests that the two men were related. Members of the de Engain family held estates in Huntingdonshire and Northamptonshire.

Olifard had four sons:

- Sir Walter Olifard, who became Justiciar of the Lothians;
- Adam, who was probably the ancestor of the Oliphants in Perthshire
- William;
- Osbert;
- Fulco.

== The Olifard's land ownings in England ==
The Olifards were tenants in demesne at Lilford. In 1086 it was held by a Walter (no surname given) who may be completely unconnected with the Olifards. The first mention of the name Olifard in connection with Lilford is William Olifard (circa 1130, who is Olifard's brother. "William Olifardus reddit conjuncture de x mercis argenti for placito terre de Lillingstan." There is no record connecting David Olifard with Lilford although his heirs held the lands following after William Olifard, his brother.

In 1116, Hugh Olifard of Orton (David's father) witnessed a transaction in the Abbot's court at Peterborough. In 1125 he is mentioned again but styled as Hugh Olifard of Stoke. In 1130 Hugh is mentioned a number of times: Hugh "Olifard" of Huntingdonshire in 1130 and in the Cambridge Pipe rolls of 1130. Again in 1130 he is a knight in the service of the Abbot of Peterborough. Stoke-Doyle is two miles south-west of Oundle and next to Lilford.

Oakington in Cambridge was held in 1086 by Roger and, between 1090 and 1108, there was in the county, a Roger Olifard, the first with the Olifard surname on record (this Roger is probably David Olifard's grandfather). Oakington was considered a dependency of Lilford and held by David Olifard's brothers and then latterly by his own heirs. The same Roger held the manor of Over, part of which later became the manor of Gavelock. Like Lilford, Over (as was Gavelock) was held by David Olifard's family before it devolved to his heirs.

== Sawtry in Huntingdon ==
David Olifard had a fief of Sawtry from Henry of Scotland (the son of Olifard's godfather, King David I of Scotland) who held it as the Earl of Huntingdon from the crown. To have been given Sawtry must have been something of an honour as "Countess Judith 'especially loved and frequented,' [the manor of Sawtry]" the lands were "freed by William I, as a mark of favour to her, from all dues to the Crown, including murdrum and danegeld,". During the civil war between King Stephen and the Empress Matilda, both Henry of Scotland and King David I of Scotland supported the Empress Matilda. This resulted in King Stephen confiscating the earldom in 1138 from Henry of Scotland and giving it to one of his supporters, Simon de Senlis II. This would have been unpopular with Olifard but nevertheless he would have been compelled to follow Simon de Senlis into battle. In 1141 Olifard was fighting on the winning side against Empress Matilda. On seeing that his godfather was in danger of being captured, Olifard abandoned Stephen's army and rescued King David I of Scotland.

Since there is no record of any other Olifards at Sawtry prior to David, it would appear that these lands had been granted to Olifard at the instigation of his godfather. The date of Henry of Scotland's forfeiture of the Earldom of Huntingdon is helpful, since Olifard would most likely have been granted the fiefdom of Sawtry once he had reached his majority. Olifard would have received the lands prior to the forfeiture in 1138 and thus was born no later than 1117 and probably earlier.

Simon de Senlis II, in an act designed to prevent Olifard from ever returning to Sawtry, founded the Cistercian monastery of Sawtry Abbey on Olifard's lands in 1147. William Olifard is a witness to this foundation charter. Sawtry is the only known property to have been held by David Olifard in England.

The nearest public house to the site of the ruins of Sawtry Abbey, in a village called Woodwalton is called "The Elephant and Castle" although nobody knows why. In 1391 Sawtry Abbey was granted a messuage and one carucate of land in Woodwalton. It could be a pun on Olifard and their residence.

In the 12th century when Olifard held Sawtry, it was called "Saltreia" or "Saltreaim".

== Arrival in Scotland ==
When Olifard arrived in Scotland, he did so as a baron of the highest status, being the same level as the most favoured newcomers into Scotland of the Anglo/Norman and Anglo/Flemish nobility.

== Career in Scotland ==
Olifard first appears in a Royal charter in Scotland in 1144. For the next 26 years he features regularly as a witness in Royal charters in King Malcolm IV's reign but does not appear to be of outstanding importance before 1165. From that year until 1170 Olifard features at the most eminent level in the charters of the kings (Malcolm and William I). Thereafter Olifard disappears from record, suggesting that he died in 1170. Olifard appears in at least ten charters as "Justiciar". Just as Sir David is the first Justiciar on record, so his son, Sir Walter Olifard is the first Justiciar of the Lothians on record to be styled as "of the Lothians". It should also be noted that at the time of Sir David Olifard, Northumbria and Cumbria were also part of Southern Scotland.

== The Hospital of Soutra ==
The Hospital of Soutra, also known as "Domus de Soltre", was the largest hospital in Scotland. It was founded in 1164 by King Malcolm IV. The name Soltre or Soutra is similar to the name of Olifard's old estate of Sawtry or Saltreia in Huntingdon, so much so that historians have confused the two.

It is perhaps no coincidence that the first charter (signed between 1153 and 1170) after the hospital's foundation is one from David Olifard and that he also granted the hospital one thrave of corn in Autumn from every carucate in his domain. Olifard's seal was appended to this charter, showing three crescents. This is the earliest example of the Oliphant arms recorded.

By 1271, a dispute had arisen between the monks at the Hospital and the inhabitants of Crailing (lands which had been owned by Olifard and his descendants). It was eventually settled in favour of the monks.

== Olifard's landownings in Scotland ==
Soon after Olifard came to Scotland, he received the lands of Smailholm and also Crailing, both in Roxburghshire. In the reign of King Malcolm IV, he was granted the lands between the North and South Calder Waters (rivers), these lands formed the core of the great barony of Bothwell. These lands were given to Olifard by the King in lieu of his lands at Sawtry in Northamptonshire. Olifard lands around Bothwell extended far beyond the Calder Waters and included the barony (and lands) of Drumsergard (which changed its name to Cambuslang in the 17th century)
