= Bracholy =

Bracholy is a place and former parish in Highland, Scotland. The parish was united with the parish of Petty, prior to the Reformation.

The name, originally Braichlich, was derived from the Gaelic Eaglais-a-Bhraighe-choille, "place on a wooded hill".

The parish church, was dedicated to Saint Ewan. William, Earl of Ross sacked the churches of Petty and Bracholy in 1281. The church was ruinous by 1792. No remains of the church are evident above ground. The graveyard is still in existence.
