= Petty, Highland =

Civil parish in Highland, Scotland

Coordinates: 57.522°N 4.105°W

Petty, or Pettie is a place and parish in Highland, Scotland.

The village of Petty is about 7 miles (11 km) north east of Inverness. The parishes of Petty and Bracholy, were united prior to the Reformation. The original parish church was dedicated to Saint Columba. William, Earl of Ross sacked the churches of Petty and Bracholy in 1281. The Moray family were Lords of Petty during the 13th and 14th centuries. This includes Andrew de Moray, Guardian of Scotland during The First War Of Scottish Independence and his son Andrew Murray.

The parish church was built in 1839. This building, now known as “Old Petty Church” has been unused since around the 1950s and has fallen into a state of disrepair. During the disruption of 1843, a majority of the congregation of “Old Petty” left the established Church of Scotland to form Petty Free Church of Scotland, with a building being erected for this purpose elsewhere in the Parish in 1847.

== See also ==
- List of listed buildings in Petty, Highland
