= Duffus =

Village in Moray, Scotland

Coordinates: 57°42′03″N 3°23′42″W

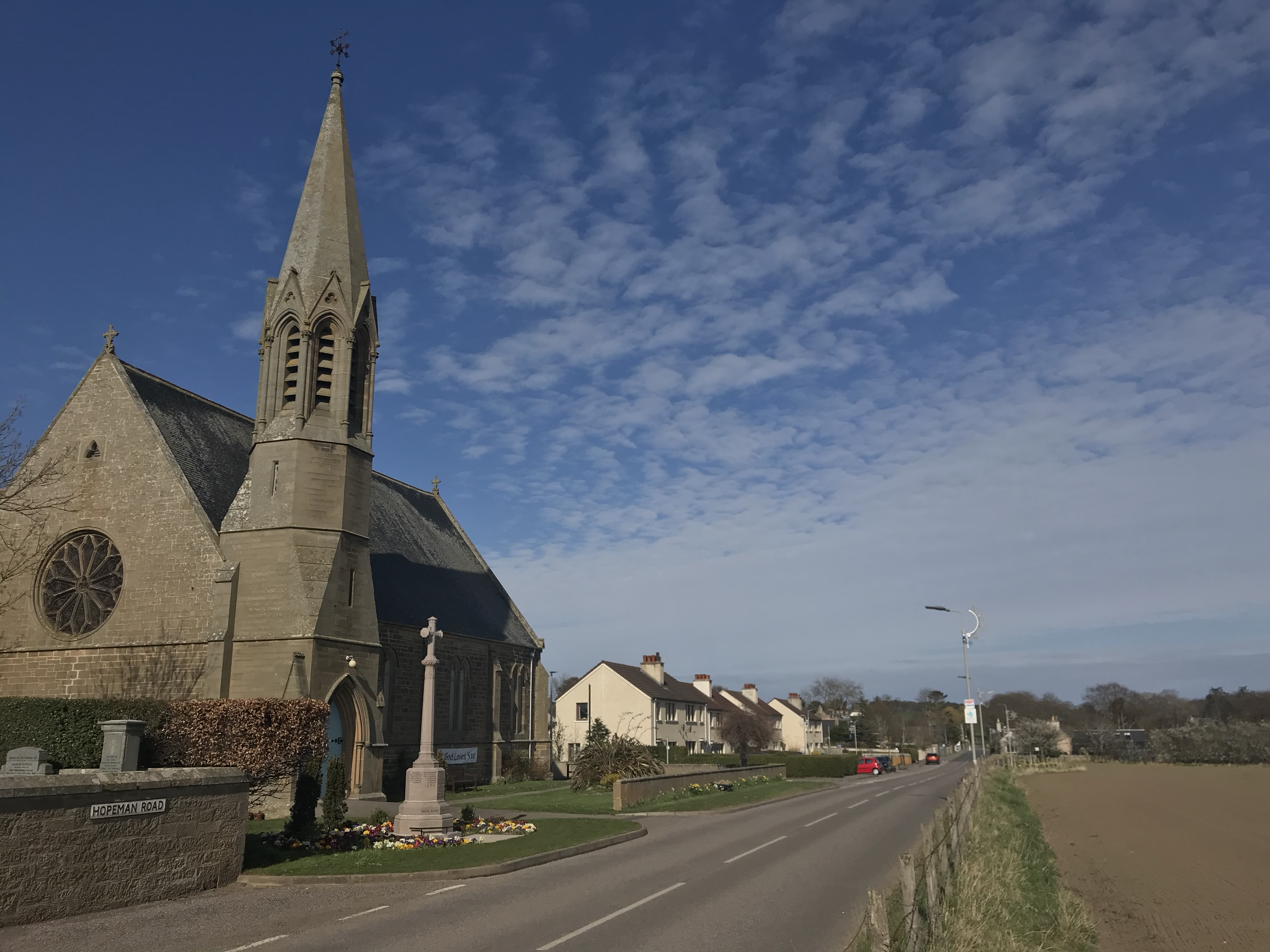
Duffus

Duffus (Scottish Gaelic: Dubhais) is a village and parish in Moray, Scotland. It is best known for the nearby Duffus Castle, St. Peters' Kirk, and Spynie Palace.

== Name ==
The name of the village Duffus derives from the lands of Duffus in Moray, Scotland. What is now known as Duffus Parish encompasses the lands of the ancient Barony of Duffus and comprises 9,565 acres (38.71 km^{2}). The Duffus name has undergone a variety of spelling changes through the years; in 1290, "Dufhus", and in 1512, "Duffous". The name is probably a compilation of two Gaelic words, dubh and uisg, meaning "darkwater" or "blackwater". At one time, the region was below sea-level and the Loch of Spynie and stagnant pools of water were a conspicuous feature of the area.

== History ==
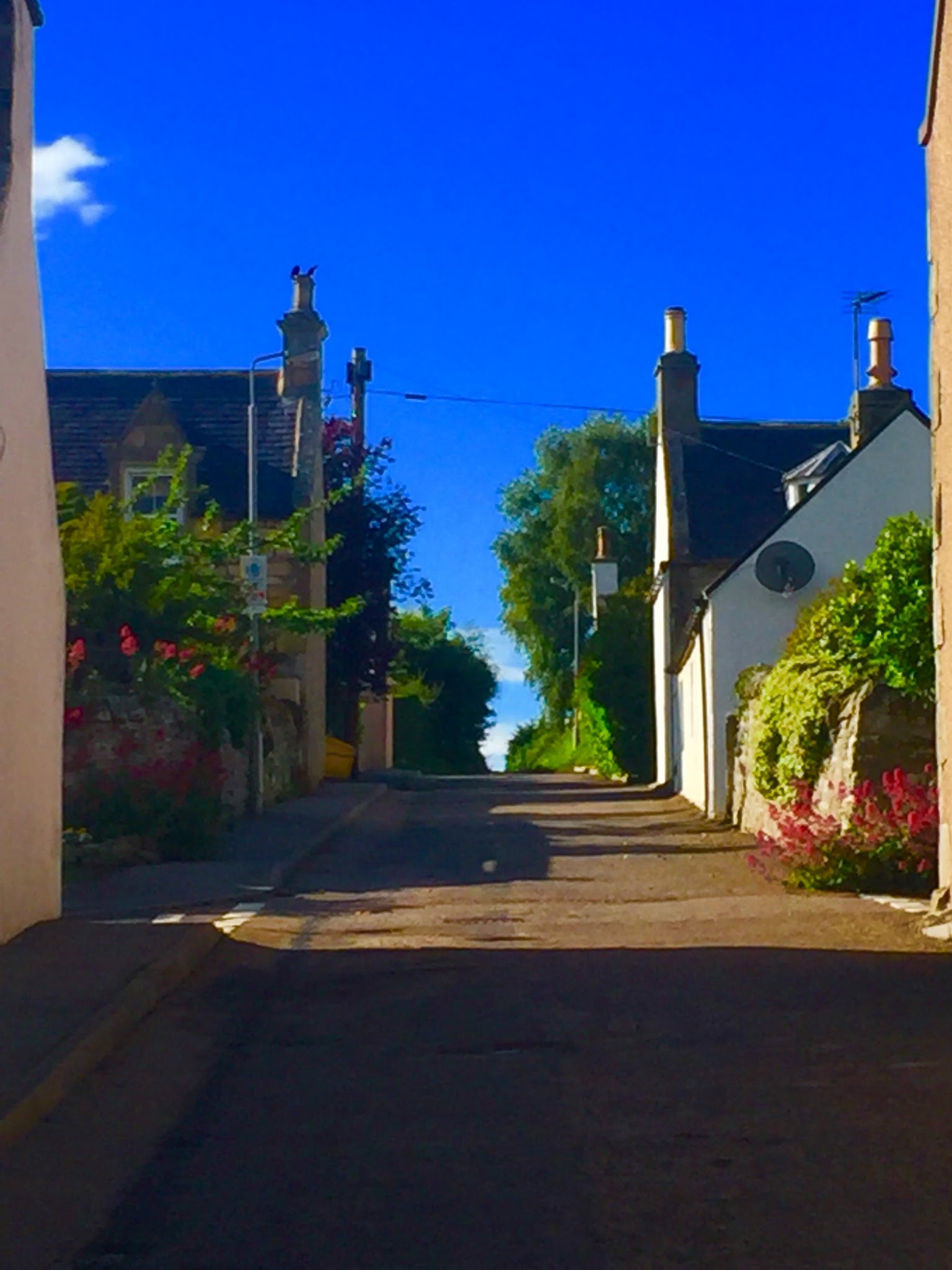
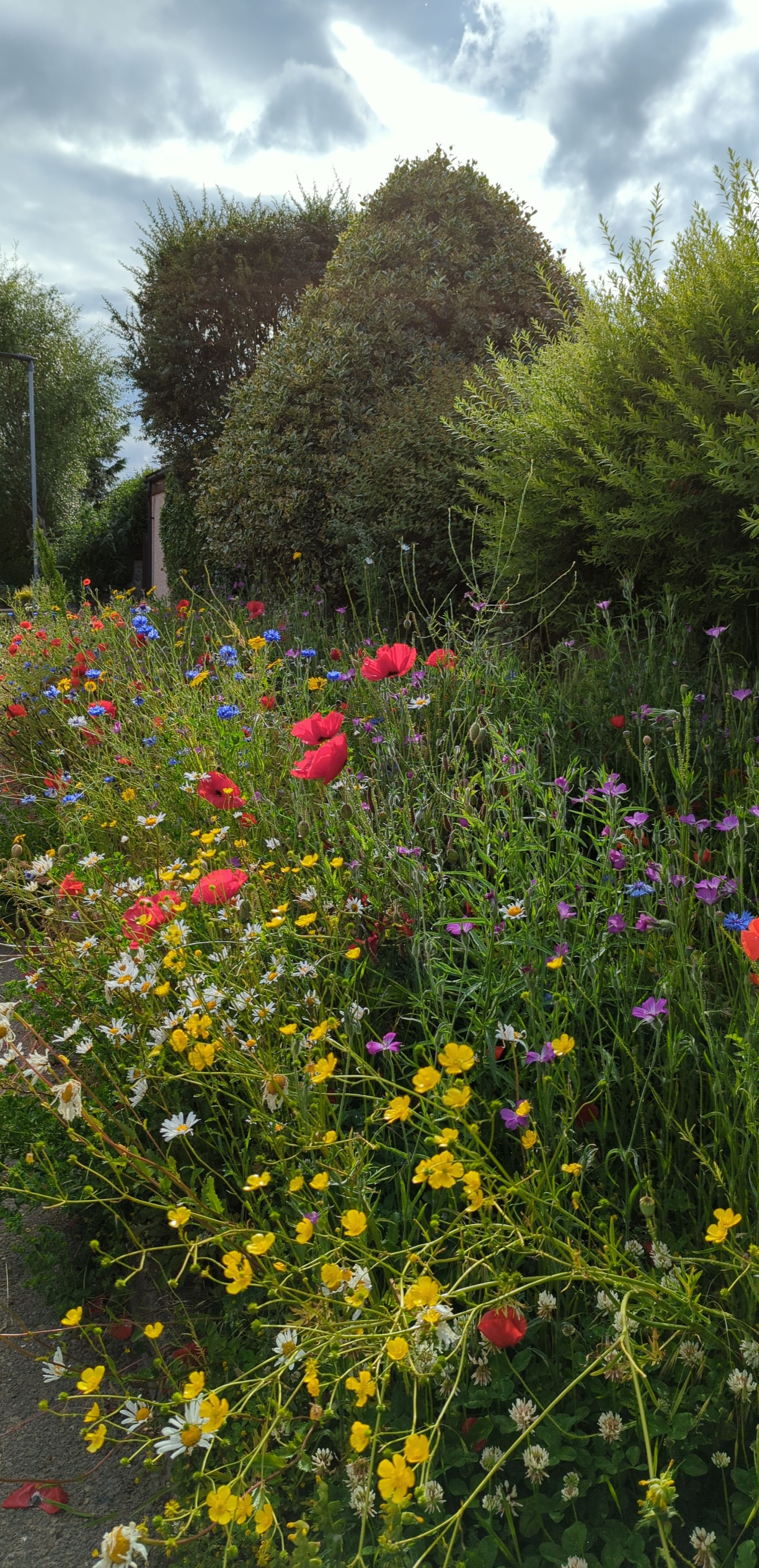
Duffus village lanes in Summer.

The current village, originally called New Duffus, is a grid plan village established as a planned settlement in 1811. This replaced an earlier medieval settlement which lay 0.4 kilometres (0.25 mi) to the east, of which only the ruined Old Parish Church remains.

A church was first founded on the site of Duffus Old Parish Church in the 9th century as a replacement for the church of St Aethan within Burghead Fort, which had been destroyed by the Vikings. The parish of Duffus included Burghead, and its dedication to Saint Peter may reflect an emulation by the Pictish Kingdom of Fortriu of the common early medieval pattern – also seen at Bamburgh and Canterbury – of giving this dedication to a Kingdom's primary centre of Royal power.

Duffus was the base of the regionally powerful de Moravia family during the High Middle Ages. The family was probably of Flemish origin. Freskin de Moravia came north from his lands in Lothian as part of an army of David I to put down another rebellion by the men of Moray. At his side, and soon to be a neighbor, was the ancestor of the Innes'.

The Dunbar baronets of Northfield have lived at the Duffus estate since the 17th century.

== Culture and community ==
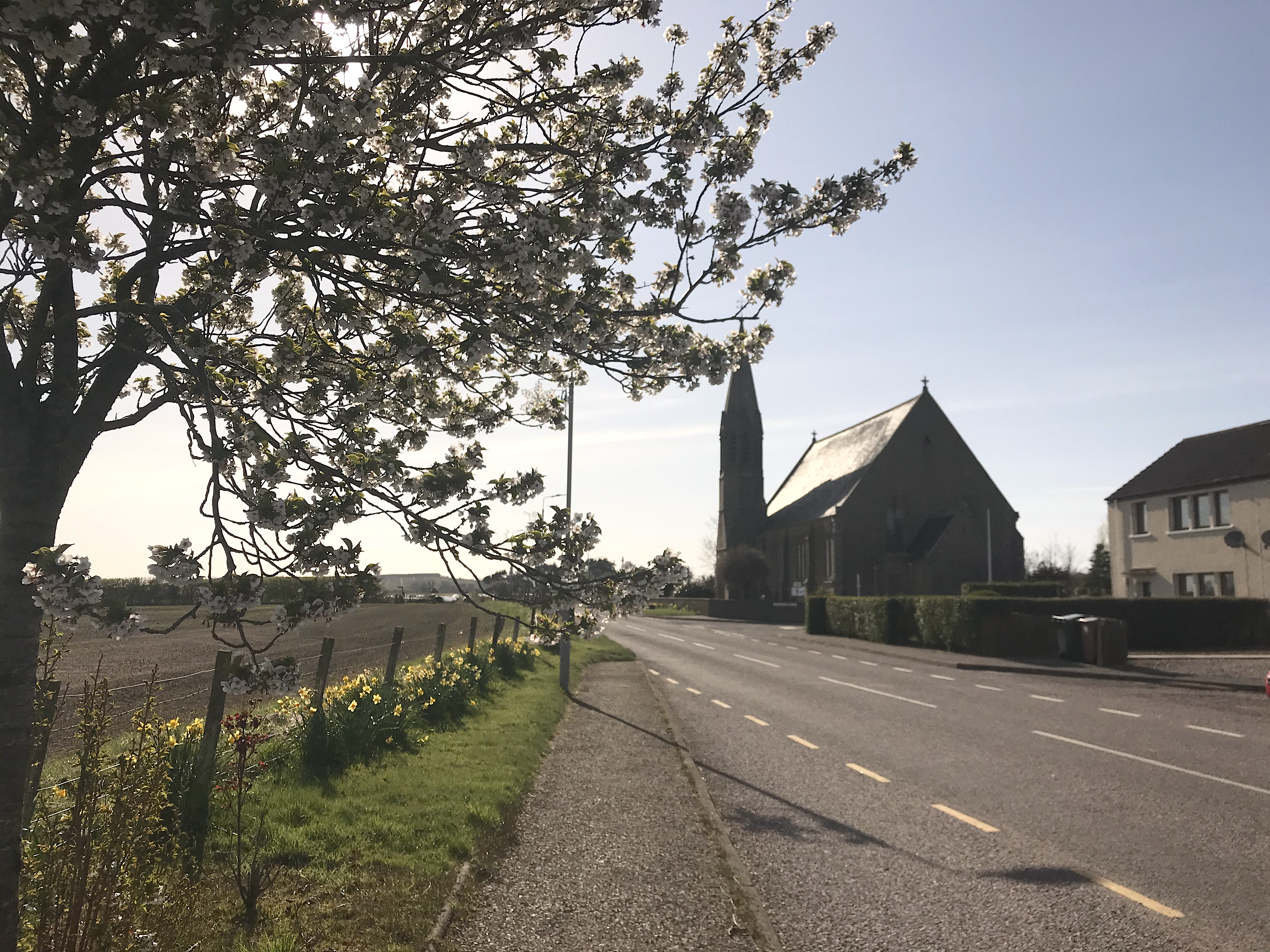
A cherry blossom tree blooming at the bus stop in Duffus. The number 32 bus stops here which goes to Burghead.

The annual Duffus Village Gala (held each summer) provides a host of activities for villagers and nearby settlements, starting with the crowning of the Rose Queen, Rose Prince & Rosebud. (Due to low entry rates the rose queen, Prince & bud no longer occur at the gala)

Volunteers publish a quarterly community newsletter, Duffus Despatches, featuring local events, and village news.

The Duffus BALL Group is part of Moray's Be Active Life Long (BALL) network, a community initiative offering gentle exercise, social activities (speakers, outings, coffee), and support for older adults (50+) to stay active, combat loneliness, and improve well-being, meeting in Duffus Village Hall.

== Notable residents ==
- William Dunbar (1749–1810), explorer
- Don Murray (1946–2026), footballer

== Nearby ==
- Covesea Bay & Caves
- Duffus Castle
- Gordonstoun School

== Bibliography ==
- Barrow, G. W. S. (2003). The Kingdom of the Scots, 2nd ed. Edinburgh: Edinburgh University Press. ISBN 0-7486-1803-1. OCLC 249360501.
- Walker, David W.; Woodworth, Matthew (2015). Aberdeenshire: North and Moray. The Buildings of Scotland (Pevsner Architectural Guides). New Haven, CT: Yale University Press. ISBN 9780300204285.
