= Oliphant (surname) =

Oliphant or Olyphant is a surname that was established in England and Scotland by a family of Norman origin. The early forms Olifard and Oliphard (likely "olif" conjoined with the intensive suffix "-ard") are believed to allude to an olive branch. Notable people with the surname include:

- Anthony Oliphant (1793–1859), Scottish lawyer and Chief Justice of Ceylon
- Betty Oliphant (1918–2004), Canadian dance educator
- Charles Oliphant (1666–1719), Scottish physician and politician
- David Olyphant (1789–1851), American trader in the Far East
- Ernest Henry Clark Oliphant (1862–1936), Australian Elizabethan scholar
- Evan Oliphant (born 1982), Scottish cyclist
- Francis Wilson Oliphant (1818–1859), British stained glass artist
- Grassella Oliphant (1929-2017), American jazz drummer
- Greg Oliphant (born 1950), Australian rugby league footballer and coach
- James Oliphant (1796–1881), Chairman of H.E.I.C. and Equerry to Maharajah Duleep Singh
- John Oliphant (died 1905), Scottish portrait painter
- Laurence Oliphant (author) (1829–1888), British author and mystic
- Laurence James Oliphant (1846–1914), 9th of Condie and 31st Chief of Clan Oliphant
- Laurence Oliphant (Jacobite) (1691–1767), Scottish Jacobite army officer
- Laurence Oliphant (Scottish politician) (1791–1862), Scottish politician
- Margaret Oliphant (1828–1897), Scottish novelist and historical writer
- Mark Oliphant (1901–2000), Australian physicist and Governor of South Australia
- Mike Oliphant (born 1963), American NFL running back
- Mildred Oliphant (born 1959), South African politician
- Pat Oliphant (1935–2026), Australian American editorial/political cartoonist
- Peter Oliphant (1950–2023), American actor and video game designer
- Rob Oliphant (born 1956), Canadian politician
- Robert Morrison Olyphant (1824–1918), American businessman, president of the Delaware and Hudson Railway
- Sarah Oliphant (born 1951), American artist and backdrop painter
- Timothy Olyphant (born 1968), American actor
- Thomas Oliphant (journalist), American journalist
- Thomas Oliphant (1799–1873), Scottish musician and artist
- W. S. Oliphant (1849–1945), American politician
- William Landon Oliphant (1900–1947), American Protestant preacher and polemicist
- William Oliphant, Lord of Aberdalgie (died 1329), Scottish magnate during the Scottish Wars of Independence
- William Oliphant (governor of Stirling Castle) (died after 1313), Governor of Stirling Castle during the Scottish Wars of Independence
- Oliphant brothers, Nigel and Harry Oliphant, manufacturers of ultraviolet lamps in South Australia

== See also ==
- Justice Oliphant (disambiguation)
- Oliphant (disambiguation)
