= Oliphant brothers =

Brothers Nigel B. Oliphant and R. Harry Oliphant of Adelaide, South Australia, founded a business manufacturing ultraviolet lamps for scientific, industrial and medical uses.

== History ==
Nigel and Harry Oliphant were, with their brothers Marcus and Donald, sons of Harold George Olifent, a prominent Theosophist, editor of the Public Service Review. He was an economist with the South Australian Auditor-General's Department, and tutor in economics at Adelaide University. All five were registered at birth with the surname Olifent.

Harry Oliphant (born 1903) joined the Physics Department workshop at the University of Adelaide, for 14 years developing and fabricating equipment for Professor Sir Kerr Grant's team of researchers, and developed skills as a glassblower. During the war he worked with the CSIRO in Sydney developing electron tubes, then for four years with Professor L. H. Martin in Melbourne.

Nigel Oliphant (born 1909) was a teacher with South Australia's Education Department, at Millicent High School from 1931 and Murray Bridge High 1938 to 1941, when he enlisted with the RAAF and served in WWII as an armament officer.

After the war they joined forces as Oliphant Laboratories Ltd., developing scientific instruments for research and teaching purposes. For around six years their manufactures included Geiger counters, using electronic circuitry devised by A. J. Love, technical instructor with the PMG Department, but specialised in ultraviolet light sources: from longer wavelength (UVA and UVB) lamps for fluorescent mineral prospecting (eg. scheelite), geological research, quality assurance and forensic work to short wavelength (UVC) germicidal lamps, as used in the food industries to control mould spores on meat, cheese, and bread. These lamps, whose envelopes are made from fused quartz imported from the US, also have applications in laminar flow cabinets as used in laboratories to protect biological samples from contamination by bacteria. Short wavelength ultraviolet radiation has also been used to combat the viruses responsible for the common cold and other air-borne diseases.

In 1950 they founded Oliphant Laboratories Ltd. with a capital of £100,000 and another partner, R. J. Oswald. By 1953 they were operating from premises at 161 Gouger Street, Adelaide. The walls for their workshop were fabricated in situ from ready-mixed concrete poured by the brothers into a steel formwork system devised by R. A. Wilson of Bowden, a method made particularly attractive by the post-war shortage of skilled labor. By 1962 they were trading as Oliphant Brothers Ltd, with offices next door at 163 Gouger Street.

== Family ==
Harold George Olifent (12 September 1876 – 1963) married Beatrice Edith Fanny Tucker ( – 29 October 1951) on 27 December 1900, and had a home at 50 Angas Road, Westbourne Park. Their family included five sons, all registered at birth with the surname Olifent:

- Marcus Laurence Elwin Oliphant (8 October 1901 – 14 July 2000) married Rosa Louise Wilbraham (1903–1987) of Glenelg, South Australia at Glenelg on 23 May 1925.

- Michael John Oliphant (born c. 1928) married Monica Viviene Kammer (4 August 1940 – )
- Vivian Margaret Oliphant (born c. 1931)

- Roland Harry Oliphant (1903–1967) married Eileen Emily Abbott (1900–1989) in 1925.
- Keith Meredith Oliphant (1 January 1905 – 1981) married Coral Mary Milton (1903–1986) in 1928. X-ray technician with Adelaide University before WWII. With the 2/3 Field Regiment of the Royal Artillery in the Greek mountains in 1940, with the RAAF in 1944. An expert in electrostatics, he was involved in the pioneering xerography work of Research Laboratories of Australia Ltd., an offshoot of Adelaide University.
- Donald Knox Oliphant (1907–1975), cartographer with Lands Department, married Grace Lillian Price (died 2000) on 11 March 1933.

- Pat Oliphant (24 July 1935 – 13 July 2026) American-naturalized political cartoonist

- Nigel Besant Oliphant (15 March 1909 – 18 September 1975) married Dora May Blyth (1902–1972) in 1934.

- Roland Elwin Oliphant (5 August 1935 – )
- Jenny Marie Oliphant (10 September 1939 – )
- another son (7 July 1945 – )
He married again, on 2 June 1973, to Phyllis Florence Harrison (died 1982).
