= Justice Oliphant =

Justice Oliphant may refer to:

- A. Dayton Oliphant (1887–1963), associate justice of the New Jersey Supreme Court
- Ethelbert Patterson Oliphant (1803–1884), associate justice of the Supreme Court of Washington Territory
