= John Oliphant =

Scottish portrait painter (died 1905)

John Oliphant (died 1905) was a Scottish portrait painter, working in the 19th century.

== Life ==
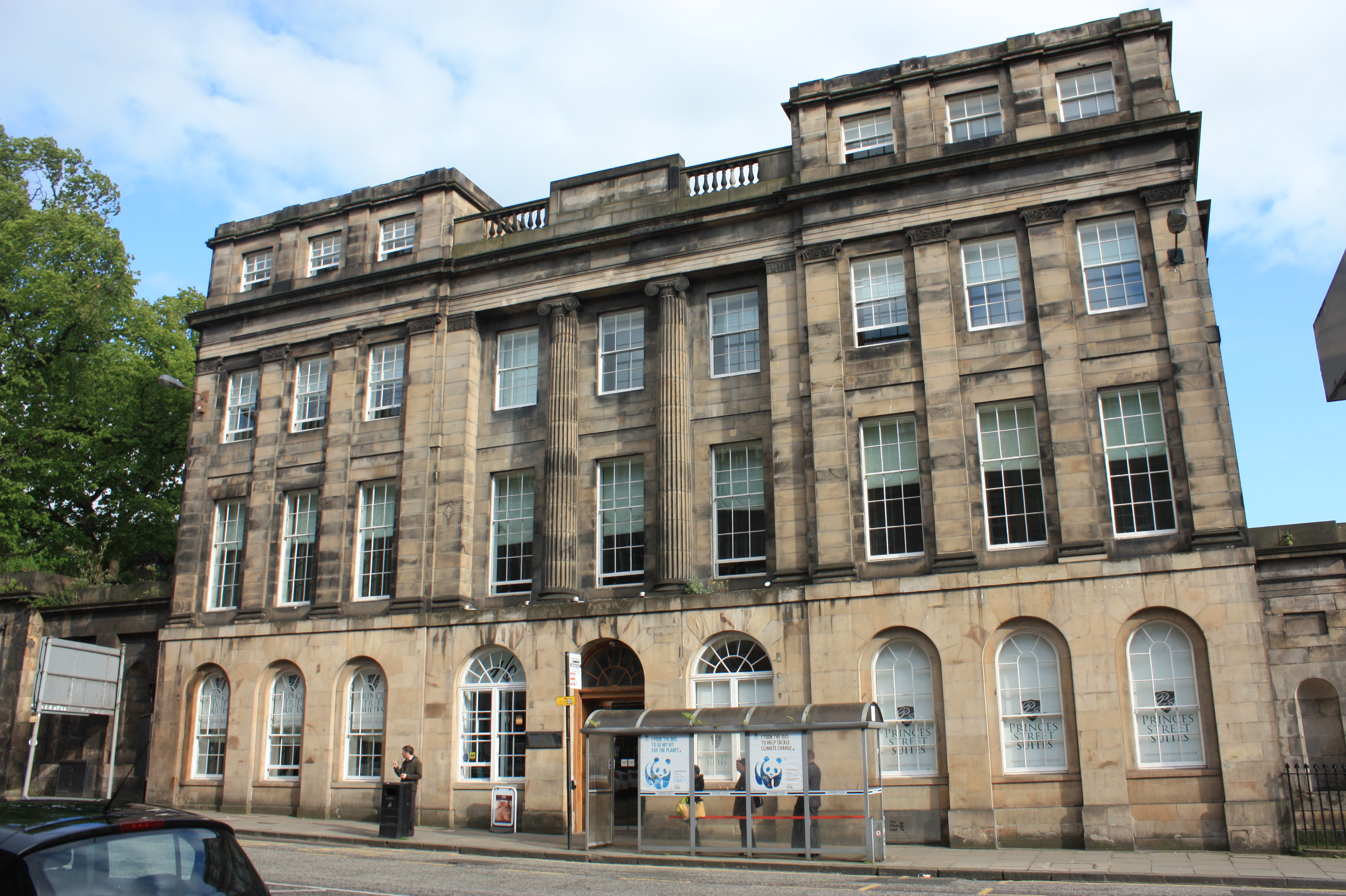
John Oliphant had a studio in this opulent building: 14 Waterloo Place, at the east end of Princes Street in Edinburgh

In the 1830s he is listed as operating from a studio at 14 Waterloo Place, at the east end of Princes Street in Edinburgh. His most productive period seems to have been 1830 to 1860.

From 1897 to 1898 Oliphant served as a member of the ruling council of the Cockburn Association, Edinburgh's influential conservation organisation that was founded in 1875.

Oliphant was brother to the stained glass artist Francis Wilson Oliphant. He was first cousin of and brother-in-law to Margaret Oliphant, the author. He died in 1905, probably in Edinburgh.

== Known works ==
- Portrait of a Lady and her Daughter (1839)
- William Wailes stained glass artist (1845), Shipley Art Gallery
- Portrait of a Young Boy (1846)
- Cottages by a Shack (1847)
- Portrait of Lt Joseph Egerton Cockburn RN (c.1868)
- Portrait of two Children gathering Wild Flowers
- Portrait of a Lady seated at a table
- Gentleman and Son seated by a window.
