= Olifard =

Olifard is a surname. Notable people with the surname include:

- David Olifard (c.1113/1117 – c. 1170), Justiciar of the Lothians
- Walter Olifard (c. 1150–1222), Justiciar of the Lothians
- Walter Olifard (died 1242), Lord of Bothwell and Abernethy and Justiciar of Lothian

== See also ==
- Oliphant (surname)
