= William Wailes =

British stained glass artist (1808–1881)

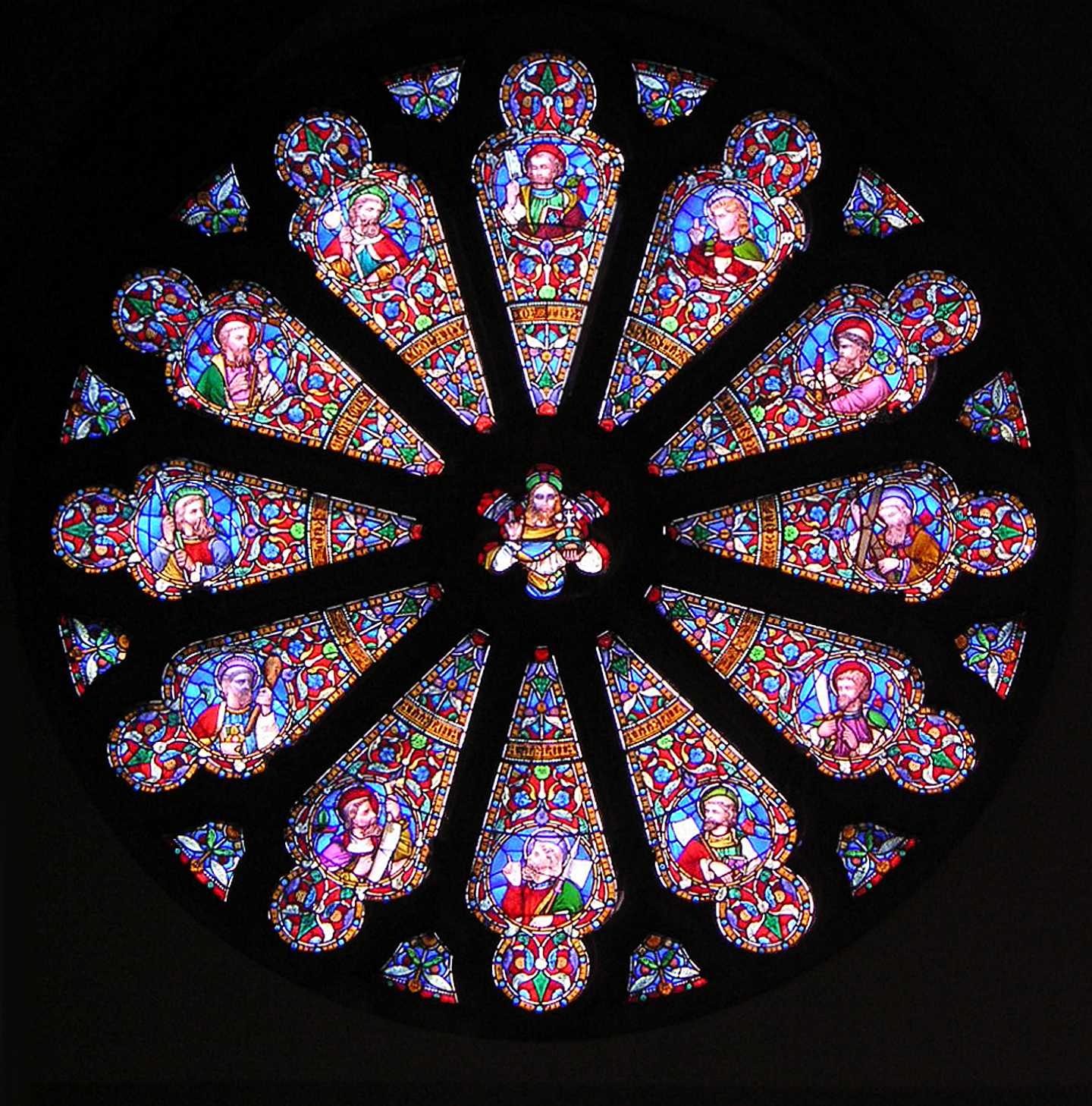
Rose window of St Matthias Church, Richmond, a church designed by Sir Gilbert Scott

William Wailes (1808–1881) was the proprietor of one of England's largest and most prolific stained glass workshops.

At Saltwell is a street named for him, William Wailes Walk, which is where Saltwell Park and his estate is located.

== Life and career ==
Wailes was born and grew up in Newcastle upon Tyne, England's centre of domestic glass and bottle manufacturing. His first business was as a grocer and tea merchant. However, his artistic talent and practical skills led him to set up a small kiln in the backyard of his premises. He made and fired small decorative enamels which were sold in his shop.

In 1830 he went to Germany to study stained glass design and production under Mayer of Munich. In 1838 he set up his own stained glass studio to design and manufacture windows and in 1841 the business began producing its own glass.

William Wailes' home at Saltwell Park, Gateshead

In 1842 the architect Augustus Pugin approached Wailes about producing windows for him. Working with Pugin was a thankless task, as Pugin went from one workshop to another in an attempt to get his designs realised at the lowest possible cost. The working relationship lasted for only three years.

Regardless of this, Wailes made a name for himself through the provision of windows for local churches. As his enterprise prospered, he employed more men until there were 76 employees, who included in their number several designers who were to go on to establish their own factories. These included Francis Wilson Oliphant R.A. (1818–1859) and George Joseph Baguley (1834–1915). William Wailes was one of the twenty-five stained glass manufacturers that exhibited in the Crystal Palace Exhibition in 1851.

Wailes married (Elizabeth) and they had several children, including a son, William Thomas Wailes, who was to join his father in the business, as did his son-in-law, Thomas Rankine Strang, in 1861, when the firm became known as Wailes and Strang.

In 1860 Wailes bought the Saltwell Estate at Gateshead and set about improving it, building himself a decorative mansion and landscaping the grounds. Unfortunately, he ran into debt and 16 years later sold the property to the Gateshead Corporation. The estate became a public park known as Saltwell Park which includes the house, Saltwell Towers. However Wailes continued to reside in his home until his death in 1881. William Thomas Wailes continued to manufacture stained glass until 1910.

== Artistic recognition ==
Wailes was painted, next to a window exemplifying his work, by John Oliphant. The painting hangs in the Shipley Art Gallery in Gateshead.

== Stained glass ==
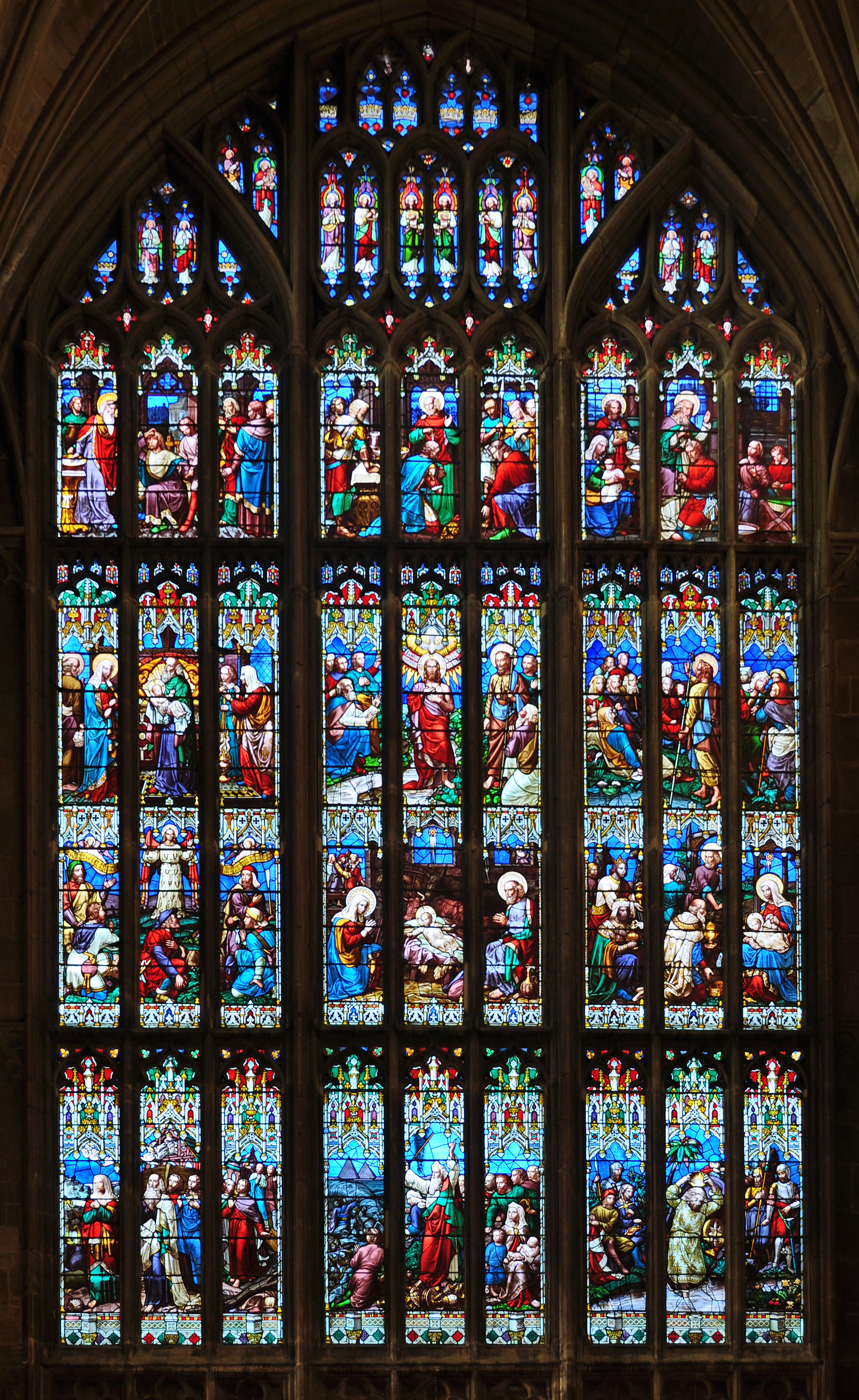
The huge west window at Gloucester Cathedral

=== Style ===
Although William Wailes employed a number of designers, the products of his workshop are often identifiable by type of glass and the particular colour combinations that prevailed. Wailes’ glass is often a little paler and more brightly coloured than many English workshops of the same date, being rather more like glass from Germany or Limoges. There are certain distinctive colour combinations that occur repeatedly in the clothing of figures in Wailes’ windows- mauve lined with bright red, yellow lined with bright blue, red lined with acid green. Many of Wailes window contain a great deal of pink glass.

Although Wailes was seen as a Gothic Revival artist, and was able to fill windows with ornate foliate patterns that have the quality of brightly painted manuscripts rather than ancient glass, his figures were elegantly classicising and decidedly staid of demeanour. Figures in Wailes’ windows communicate in a series of stereotypical hand gestures. Moreover, the details of faces are applied in a painterly manner, as against the almost calligraphic manner with which some of the 19th-century artists such as John Hardman imitated ancient windows. The painterly manner is typical of that employed by Mayer of Munich, with whom Wailes trained.

=== Gloucester Cathedral ===
While most of the work of Wailes' workshop is to be found in the North of England, other commissions came from further afield. The most significant window glazed by the firm, and one of the prize commissions of the industry, was the glazing of the west window of Gloucester Cathedral, an enormous window of c.1430 in the Perpendicular Gothic style, of nine lights and four tiers. This window complemented, at the other end of the building, one of the largest ancient windows in the world; the east window (which is as big as a tennis court) fortunately had retained much of its 14th-century glass, comprising many tiers of figures.

Wailes' west window at Gloucester is a stupendous achievement, and not just because of the technicalities involved in glazing such a vast area. It makes no attempt to imitate the style or content of the east window. The content of the west window, like that of so many other commissions, was probably stipulated by a committee. Because the window was so large there was room for a large number of narratives and many figures.

The window comprises nine vertical sections called lights which are divided by mullions into three lots of three. The window rises in three stages, the first and the third being approximately half as tall as the middle one, the whole being surmounted by many smaller vertical tracery lights, which Wailes predictably filled with singing angels neatly arranged in robes of violet, bright red and arsenic green.

Wailes' design divides the window's main part into four rather than three stages, each containing three complex narrative scenes which are made successfully to span three lights. The central section which shows the Nativity of Christ with the Baptism of Christ in the Jordan by John the Baptist (one below the other) is a particularly successful composition, considering that it contains two significant narrative incidents which visually harmonise, yet remain discrete scenes. While each of the twelve individual pictures works as a unit, the visual composition of the whole window is skilfully arranged so as to present as an integrated work of art. This has been achieved by the skilled placement of the 116 figures and the equally skilful disposition of colour.

== Churches containing stained glass by William Wailes ==
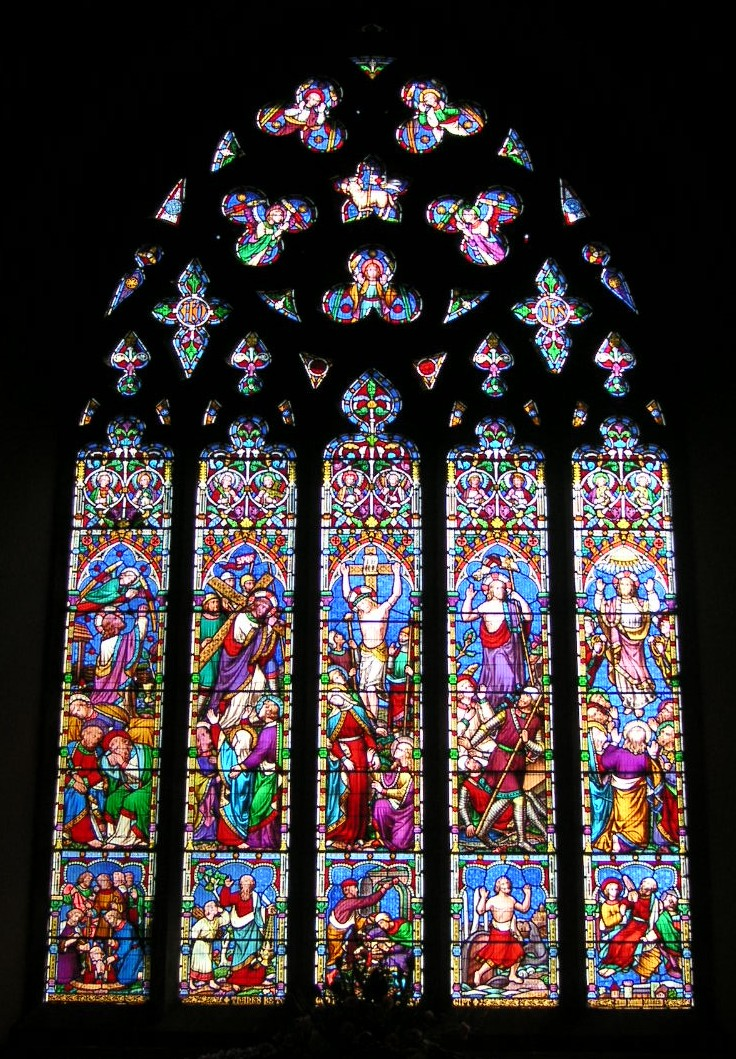
The East window of the church of St Mary at Chilham in Kent, dated 1864

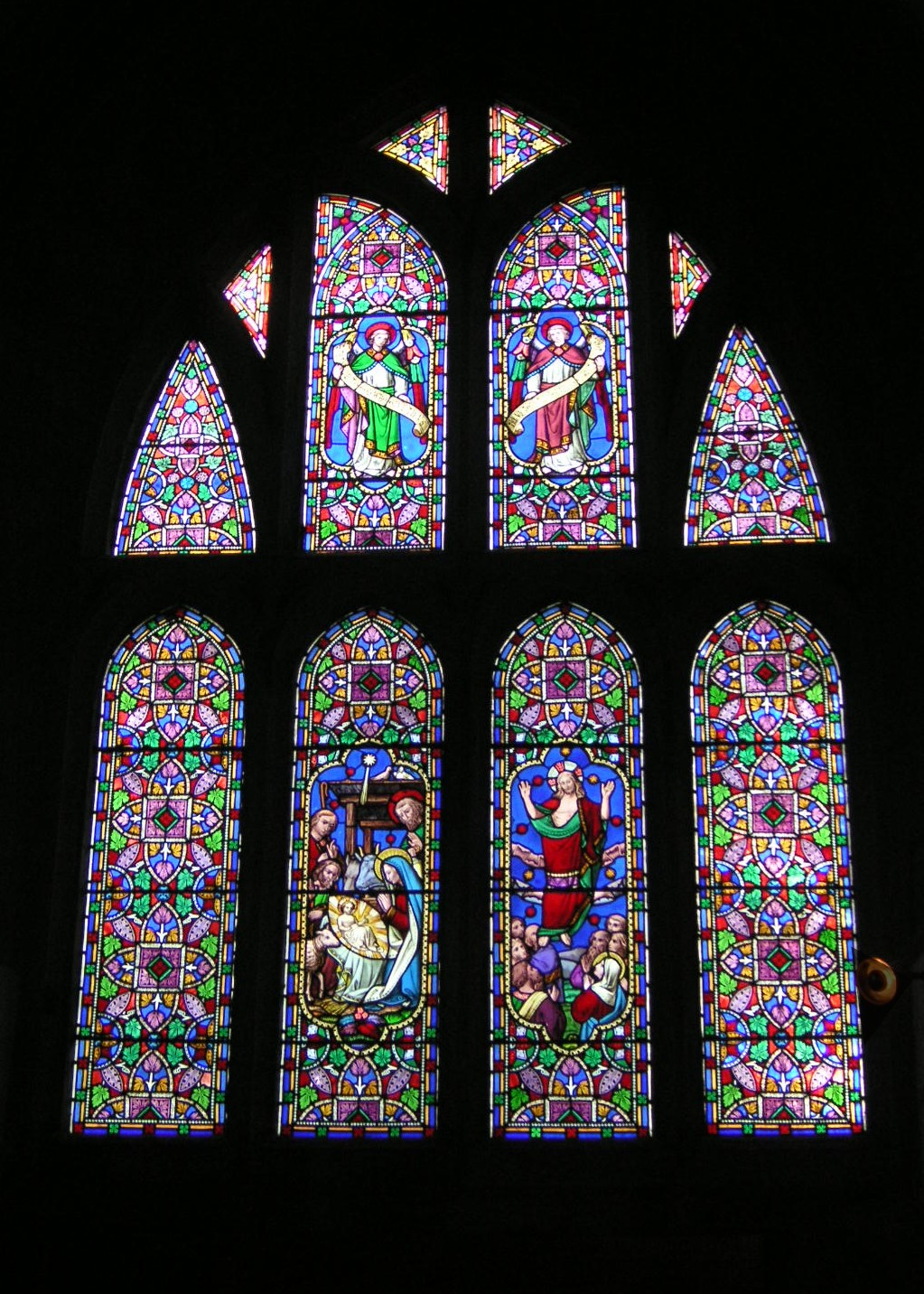
In the church of Ss Peter and Paul, Great Missenden

=== England ===
- St Andrew's Church, Bradfield, Berkshire
- St Mary's Church, Thatcham, Berkshire
- Church of St Peter and St Paul, Great Missenden, Buckinghamshire
- St Helen Witton's Church, Northwich, Cheshire
- Church of St Mary the Virgin, Ambleside, Cumbria
- All Saints' Church, Huntsham, Devon
- St John the Evangelist's Church, Birtley, County Durham
- St Helen's Church, Low Fell, County Durham
- Holy Trinity Church, Sunderland, County Durham
- Gloucester Cathedral
- St Edward's Church, Stow on the Wold, Gloucestershire
- St Matthias' Church, Richmond, Greater London
- St George's Cathedral, Southwark, Greater London
- St Mark's Church, St John's Wood, Greater London
- All Saints' Church, Hursley, Hampshire
- St Mary's Church, Kingsclere, Hampshire
- St George's Church, Benenden, Kent
- St Mary's Church, Chilham, Kent
- St Lawrence's Church, Waltham, Kent
- St Swithun's Church, Bintree, Norfolk
- St Andrew's Church, Blo' Norton, Norfolk
- St Andrew's Church, Bradenham, Norfolk
- St Maurice's Church, Briningham, Norfolk
- St Lawrence's Church, Castle Rising, Norfolk
- St Mary's Church, Colkirk, Norfolk
- St Peter's Church, Crostwick, Norfolk
- St Edmund's Church, Emneth, Norfolk
- St. Andrew's Church, Great Ryburgh, Norfolk
- St Peter and St Paul's Church, Swaffham Norfolk
- Hexham Abbey, Hexham, Northumberland
- St Mary's Church, Clipsham, Rutland
- St Mary's Church, Ellesmere, Shropshire
- St James the Less, Fradswell, Staffordshire
- St Editha's Church, Tamworth, Staffordshire
- St Martin's Church, Dorking, Surrey
- St John's Church, Piddinghoe, East Sussex
- Chichester Cathedral, Chichester, West Sussex
- St Mary's Church, Singleton, West Sussex
- St Botolph's Church, Farnborough, Warwickshire
- St Boniface's Church, Bonchurch, Isle of Wight
- St James' Church, Devizes, Wiltshire
- Church of St Anne, Catterick, North Yorkshire
- Bridlington Priory, Bridlington, East Yorkshire
- Church of St Thomas, Thurstonland, West Yorkshire
- St Martin's Church, Firbeck, South Yorkshire
- The Priory of St Peter and St Paul Brinkburn Priory, Brinkburn, Northumberland
- Newcastle Cathedral
- St Augustine's Church, Hedon, East Yorkshire
- St Paul's Church, Stalybridge, Greater Manchester

=== Elsewhere ===
- Cathedral of The Isles, Millport, Ayrshire, Scotland
- Sandyford Henderson Memorial Church, Glasgow, Scotland
- Christ Church St Laurence, Sydney, Australia
- Afghan Church, Mumbai, India
- First Presbyterian Church, Philadelphia, United States

== See also ==
=== Other early 19th-century firms ===
- Thomas Willement
- William Warrington
- Charles Edmund Clutterbuck
- Hardman & Co.
- Augustus Welby Pugin

=== Context ===
- British and Irish stained glass (1811–1918)
- Poor Man's Bible
