= W. S. Oliphant =

American politician

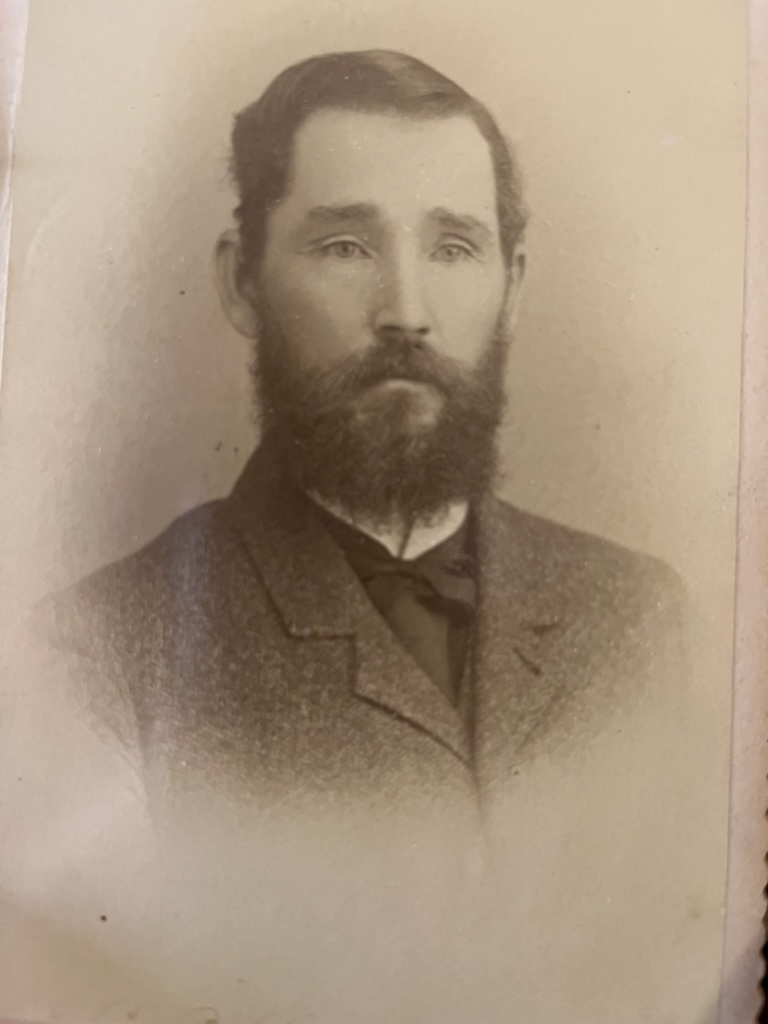

Member of the Washington House of Representatives
- In office 1889–1891

Personal details
- Born: February 1, 1849 Olive Green, Noble County, Ohio, United States
- Died: June 24, 1945 (aged 96) Garfield, Washington, United States
- Party: Republican
- Spouse: Emma Honoretta Hayward
- Occupation: farmer

Winchester Stewart Oliphant (February 1, 1849 – June 24, 1945) was an American politician, one of the thousands of Americans who traveled across the United States in the second half of the 19th Century to establish a life in the northwest. He ultimately homesteaded and purchased land in Garfield County, WA and is best known for serving in the Territorial Legislature that helped set up the constitution for the State of Washington and then being elected to the House of Representatives in the first Washington State Legislature from 1889-90. During that session, he was Chair of the Agriculture Committee and introduced House Bill 90 which was passed in that session to establish Washington State University, a land grant University with “the object of said school shall be to train teachers of physical science and thereby to further the application of the principles of physical science to industrial pursuits”.

== Background and early life ==
Winchester was born Feb 1 1849 in Beverly Ohio. He was the 3rd child of Davis Oliphant (1814-1892) and Mary Sharp (1823- 1907) who eventually had a total of 9 children and 8 lived into adulthood. His Oliphant ancestors came from Scotland to New Jersey in 1685. There is little record of Winchester’s childhood and family circumstances. He obtained a full education by attending Beverly College and Ohio University in Athens, Ohio. He had elegant handwriting and was very literate for a young man of his age. His literacy skills helped him greatly in establishing his early jobs and later work in the legislature.

== Move west and first jobs ==
Initially, he farmed and taught school near Beverly in Ohio and then emigrated in 1871 to Kansas at age 22 to join an older brother. He taught school at Burlingame in Osage County for a year. Like many young men, he had caught the “western fever” and from there he traveled to Silverton, Oregon in 1872 where again he was a teacher and even bought a wheat ranch at Halsey, Oregon that he sold at the end of 6 months. During that time, he also managed a fruit drying plant for a season and became associated with DJ Steward and Company to help publish a history of Siskiyou County, California. In 1874 he became associated with the Pelton's Threshing Machine Manufacturing Company, as their Secretary and General Agent in the area around Salem, Oregon. They manufactured horse-powered threshing machines and he worked with them for 5 years.

Winchester and Emma Honoretta Hayward, who later became his wife, corresponded regularly during the 10 years he was away from Ohio. One letter he wrote to Emma dated June 17, 1879 describes the state of development of the region and his enthusiasm for the area:

“I will now be quite busy till some time in August. My business will be entirely with the farmers as I shall now be selling the machinery hence will be away from town most all the time…for five or six weeks my letters will be more or less irregular…It begins to be evident that I will get my affairs in good shape as early as I anticipated and I think more satisfactory than I had hoped. The rains are over here. The valley looks its best and this will be a prosperous year for this state. New York capitalists are investing here. J Gould has purchased the stock of the O. S. W. Company on the Columbia River and now controls its entire navigation. The North Pacific Railroad will be completed in a few years and the Utah Northern is pushing rapidly for the Columbia River. This line is owned by Gould. This insures two transcontinental railways to this state. California capitalists are beginning to realize that this is a better state than California and are investing. Soon Oregon will not be so far away apparently as it is now.”

== Marriage, homesteading and farming ==
He returned to Ohio to marry Emma Hayward at Beverly, Ohio on Feb 25, 1880. They had met in their early teens and stayed in regular contact for 14 years before marrying at a large wedding with over 100 guests. They traveled west on the train to San Francisco and then by ship to Portland, OR, and traveled on to Salem, OR where they initially made their home. At that time Winchester helped organize the Historic Publishing Company which published a history of Umatilla County, Oregon, and then a history of SE counties of WA (Walla Walla, Columbia, Garfield, and Whitman). In working on this publication, he became interested in the region of SE Washington. In 1882 he filed for some land to establish a homestead and they moved to Dayton, Washington.

They built a house on a homestead and spent 6 months “proving it up” somewhere near the current Dayton/Garfield County boundary (“Dry Creek South of Dodge Station”). They then spent 2 years establishing a homestead in Garfield County on the hills above Pataha Creek and lived in a 10 X 15 ft cabin. Since they raised cattle that needed regular watering, they bought land on Pataha Creek and moved there in 1899. In 1907 they built a large home that still stands on the Pataha Creek property. Wheat, barley, and cattle were raised on over 2000 acres of land.

During 1882, when Oregon was still a territory, he worked part-time with Customs. Again in 1893, he worked for about 3 months in Olympia as “inspector of Chinese immigration”. During World War I he raised mules and sold them to the military and found it a profitable operation.

== Political life ==
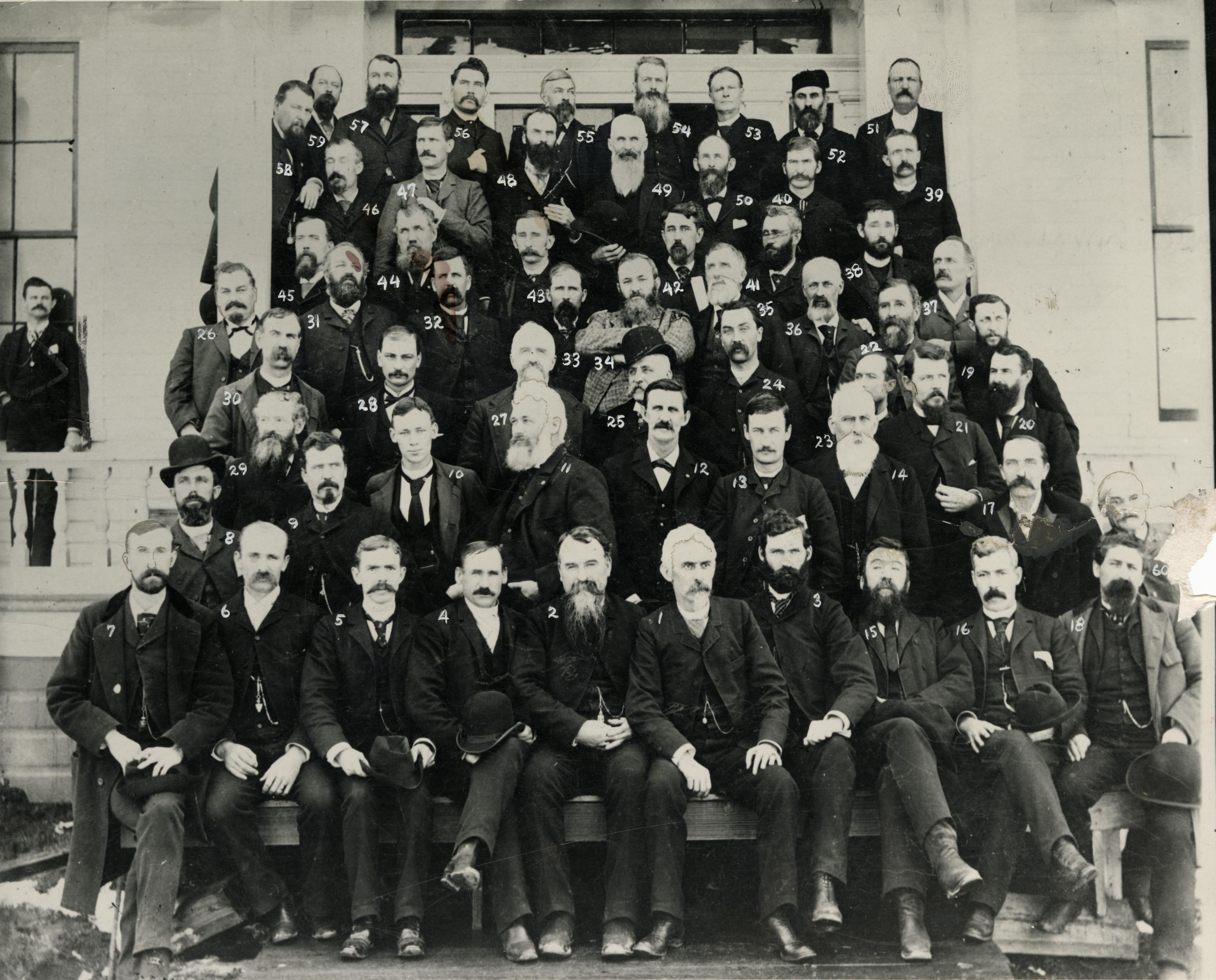
Oliphant (38) as member of Washington's first legislature, November 1889

Winchester placed a high value on education and was particularly interested in developing educational institutions that assisted agriculture and the use of other resources from the land in Washington State. The Morrill Act of 1862 had established a system for States to set up Land Grant Colleges with the assistance of federal funding. Essentially there was a federal grant of 90,000 acres of land for a College of Agriculture and Mechanic Arts and another grant of 100,000 acres of land for a scientific school. Before Washington was formally a state this program had attracted considerable attention and was certain to be taken up by the first State Legislature. In November 1888, Winchester was elected from Asotin and Garfield County to be a delegate to the State Constitutional Convention (WS Oliphant 697 votes, Joseph Ledgerwood 544 votes) that was held in July 1889. He then ran for the House of Representatives from Garfield County and won with 474 votes while his opponent, James Parker, had 449 votes.

Even before the election, he started working with a banker friend and a local bachelor friend, Mr. Robert Connel, to develop a bill to establish a land grant college in WA state. Connel was somewhat eccentric and a bit of a recluse who lived on 160 acres of undeveloped land in Garfield County, but he was highly educated in the most up-to-date scientific information of that time. He was born in Scotland, graduated from the University of Edinburgh and studied in Berlin, Paris, and Rome. He had traveled extensively across the globe. He came to Portland, OR in 1878 as a representative of the Scotch Mortgage Loan Company which did extensive loan business in the NW. He became dissatisfied with that position and moved to Garfield County in 1881. When he went into Pomeroy, he wore a “spotlessly clean white duck suit” and “spent much of his time reading Tolstoy and studying languages”.

Connel had a large library of scientific books of the time and became particularly sympathetic to the land grant college movement. Winchester and his banker friend met with Connel for several months and Connel carried out extensive correspondence with leaders of the existing land grant colleges as well as men interested in education through science and technology in Europe to try to determine the most effective legislation to establish such a college. Once the first legislature session started, they knew there would be a scramble by many legislators to have the college established in their county. They had their bill outlined before the Legislative session began and had submitted drafts to presidents of many land grant colleges in the US to get their suggestions. Connel apparently lobbied extensively for the bill by writing letters to newspapers in the region and attending sessions of the legislature in Olympia, wearing his familiar white suit.

In the first legislative session, Winchester was able to secure the position of Chair of the Agriculture Committee and to establish that bills for a land grant college would go through his committee, not the Education Committee. He was probably able to get this position in part because 70% of the House of Representatives in that first legislative session were farmers and many were illiterate. In addition, there was only one scribe hired to write down all of the proceedings of the session which involved establishing a major set of laws for the State. Winchester’s ability to write and his very clear penmanship put him in a prominent position to head the Agriculture Committee.

Several bills to establish a land grant college in specific counties were submitted to the Committee. But none had any details regarding the components of education the college was to address. Winchester submitted the bill he and Connel had developed as HB No. 90 on Dec. 13, 1889, which, in contrast to the other bills, did not specify a specific location but set up a Commission that would determine the best location. Section 8 of the Bill, detailed the specific topics to be taught and the establishment of “one physical laboratory or more, one chemical laboratory or more and one biological laboratory or more, and suitably furnish and equip the same.” In addition, it specified that a “department of agriculture” would be established to provide instruction: “First. Physics, with special application of its principles in agriculture. Second. Chemistry with special application of its principles to agriculture. Third. Morphology and physiology of plants, with special reference to the commonly grown crops and their fungous enemies. Fourth. Morphology and physiology of the lower forms of animal life, with special reference to insect pests. Fifth. Morphology and physiology of the higher forms of animal life, and in particular of the horse, cow, sheep and swine. Sixth. Agriculture, with special reference to the breeding and feeding of livestock and the best modes of cultivation of farm produce.” And it required that there be “an agricultural experimental station in connection with the department of agriculture.”

Their Bill was voted out of the Committee and passed the House of Representatives by mid-January 1890. It went through the Senate and was signed into law on 3/28/1890. It took two more years before the Agricultural College, Experimental Station and School of Sciences (later to become Washington State University) opened. Winchester was also on other House Committees including Roads and Highways, Water Rights and Irrigation, and Tide Lands. He introduced some other bills into the legislature, some of which passed, but they mainly had to do with the regulation of agricultural produce such as a bill on regulating the exchange of flour for wheat by steam and water power grist mills. He did introduce “an act relating to building, loan and saving associations doing a general business” that was referred to the Committee on Corporations. Of interest, is that he was one of 9 legislators that voted against a bill asking for a special act of Congress to authorize surveying and purchasing a coal claim of Wm Packwood, an early explorer in the area around White Pass. He also voted along with all other members of the legislature to open land on the Colville Native American reservation in WA state to homesteading.

He returned to Garfield County and never ran for political office again although he remained active in the State Republican Party and in local politics and was often a delegate from Garfield County to the Republican State Convention. He was in regular contact through correspondence with the Presidents of WA State University and was considered a Founder of the College. Robert Connel continued to live on his farm, at a later time he married, and then after his wife died committed suicide in 1917 after having felt that he no longer had anything to offer the world. He was eventually honored as one of the Founders of WA State College at its 50th anniversary celebration.

== Descendants ==
Winchester and Emma married in Beverly, Ohio on Feb 25, 1880. They had 5 children but three of them died before a year of age, all from gastroenteritis. Marietta May (1884-1952) graduated from Oberlin College and worked briefly in a lawyer’s office before returning to Garfield County. She never married and lived with her parents to help manage the ranch. Their daughter Amy (1893-1972), married Harold Price (1895-1984) in October 1916 whom she had met while attending a technical school in Cleveland. They had 4 children: Lucille (1917-2009), Dorothy (1918-2001), Betty (1920-1997) and Kenneth (1928-2021). Harold Price operated the ranch starting in 1930 and was assisted by his son Kenneth Price in the 1950s. The ranch continues to be in the family and is now operated by a fifth-generation descendant. In addition to producing wheat and canola, it now generates electricity by multiple wind turbines.

== Later life ==
In his later years, he was often described as a “gentleman farmer” although he did not have any tenants who helped with the farm work until the family moved to Pataha Creek. One story is told “of Mr. Oliphant illustrating his shrewdness and sense of humor. For many years he was in the habit of wearing a white collar on a black shirt, on all occasions. One year a threshing crew was at work threshing grain near his house. This was before the coming of the combine harvester when the crew consisted of twelve to fifteen men. Mr. Oliphant, with his dog at his heels, walked out to inspect the work occasionally, with his ever-present white collar on his black shirt. This seemed to amuse the boys in the crew and they made up a purse, and had the roustabout, whose duty was to look after supplies and run errands, purchase a box of paper collars which were then common, and the next time Mr. Oliphant came out with his dog, he noticed that each member of the crew was wearing a white collar in spite of sweat and dust. He said nothing, but returned to his house. In a few minutes he came back, followed by Towser, who was also proudly wearing a white collar. The boys laughed heartily, concluding that the joke was on them.“
