= Ethelbert P. Oliphant =

American judge

Ethelbert Patterson Oliphant
- Education: Washington & Jefferson College
- Occupation: Judge
- Known for: Judge in Supreme Court of Washington Territory

Ethelbert Patterson Oliphant (October 4, 1803 – May 8, 1884) was a judge of the Supreme Court of Washington Territory from 1861 to 1865. He graduated from Jefferson College (now Washington & Jefferson College).
