= Kerr Grant =

Australian physicist

Sir Kerr Grant
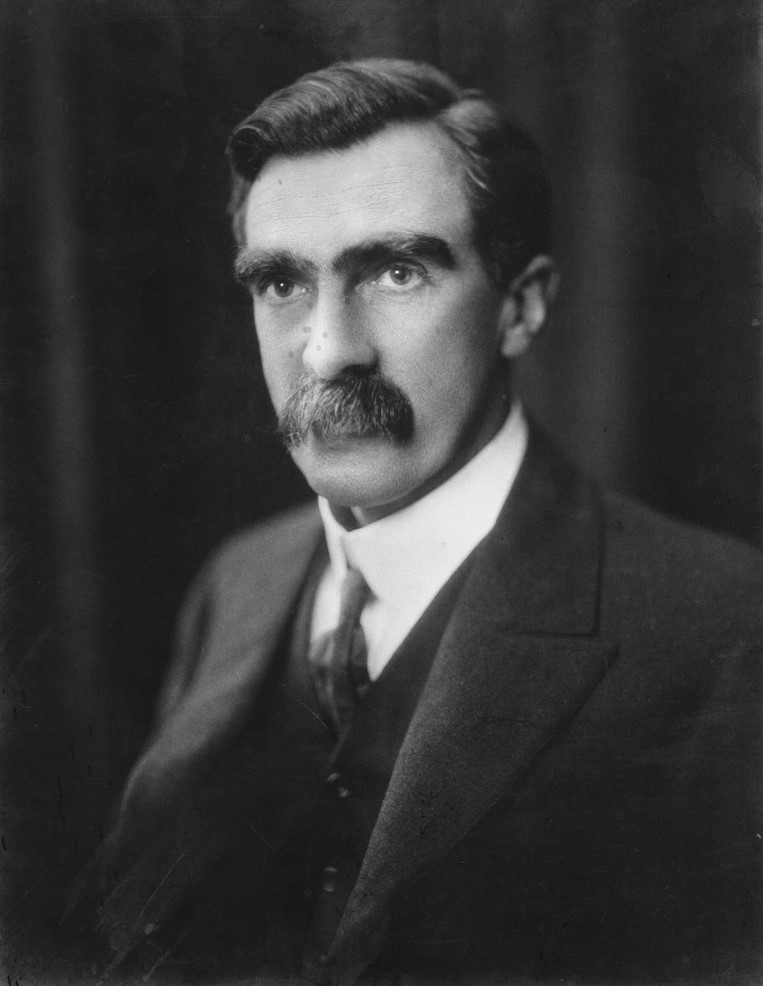
- Kerr Grant
- Born: 26 June 1878; Bacchus Marsh, Australia
- Died: 13 October 1967 (aged 89); Adelaide, Australia
- Education: University of Melbourne
- Scientific career
- Workplaces: University of Adelaide
- Doctoral advisor: Thomas Ranken Lyle
- Doctoral students: William O. Gibberd

Professor Sir Kerr Grant (1878–1967) was an Australian physicist and a significant figure in higher education administration in South Australia in the first half of the twentieth century.

Kerr Grant was born in the then rural town of Bacchus Marsh, near Melbourne in the Australian state of Victoria in 1878. He was awarded a scholarship to Ormond College and studied mathematics at the University of Melbourne and was awarded a B.Sc. in 1901 and M.Sc. in 1903, both with first class honours. In 1904, he studied at the University of Göttingen in Germany where he studied with American Nobel Prize winning chemist and physicist Irving Langmuir. In 1911, he was appointed Elder professor of physics at the University of Adelaide. He held this position until 1948 and his students included Dr. Douglas Allen of the British atomic research team, Professor George Eric MacDonnell Jauncey, professor of physics at Washington University in St. Louis, Hugh Cairns, Mark Oliphant, and Howard Florey (later Baron Florey).

In 1919, he attended the laboratories of the General Electric Co. at Schenectady in the United States. While there he was intrigued by the work performed there on molecular films and on return to Adelaide encouraged study on such films on mercury. During World War II, like many scientists, Grant was involved in war work. He was appointed chairman of the Scientific (physics) Manpower Advisory Committee, controller of the Adelaide branch of the Army Inventions Directorate, a member and later chairman of the Optical Munitions Panel (of the Ordnance Production Directorate), and a member of the physical and meteorological sub-committee of the Chemical Defence Board.

While he never considered himself an outstanding physicist, Grant's work during the war and in teaching and administration led to the award of a knighthood in the 1947 New Year Honours. He was involved in the popularisation of science through a newspaper column answering reader questions on scientific matters and was seen by some as an archetypal absent minded professor, a portrayal which he greatly enjoyed. He was an extremely popular figure at the University of Adelaide, and cheerfully played along with the many practical jokes played upon him by his students, usually involving his 1929 vintage car, which he steadfastly refused to get rid of. His final lecture on his retirement in 1948 was attended by around 700 past and present students, and was the rowdiest "rag" honouring a departing professor in the history of the university. Sir Kerr Grant died in 1967 from pneumonia after being admitted to hospital with a broken hip. Kerr Grant Terrace in the Adelaide suburb of Plympton is named after him, as are lecture theatres in both the University of Adelaide's North Terrace campus and the University of South Australia's City East campus.
