= Sarah Oliphant =

American artist and backdrop painter (born 1951)

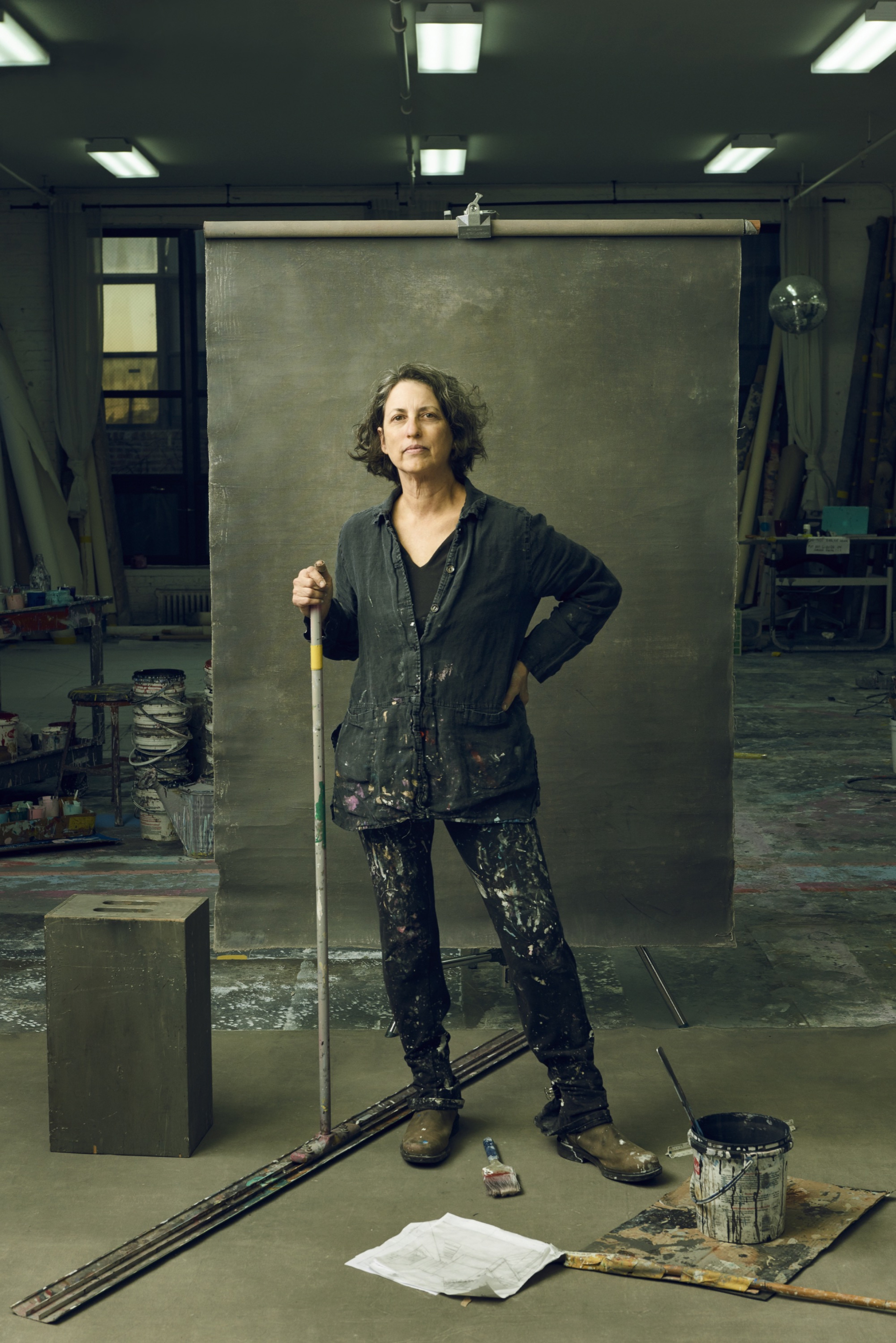
Oliphant in her studio, 2015

Sarah Oliphant (born 1951) is an American artist and backdrop painter. She is the founder of Oliphant Studio, a New York City–based atelier specializing in hand-painted photography backdrops. Her work has appeared in major magazines, portrait photography, and museum exhibitions, and she has been profiled by The New York Times and Forbes.

== Early life and education ==
Oliphant, a native of Chester, South Carolina, began creating artwork by attending after-school art lessons starting in the second grade from Lois Brice. Oliphant continued to study privately with Brice throughout high school. She went on to study at the University of South Carolina where she earned a degree in applied art and also took graduate classes in the theater program. She later worked painting scenery for the Virginia Museum Theatre before moving to New York, where she worked as a freelance painter for Off-Broadway productions.

== Career ==
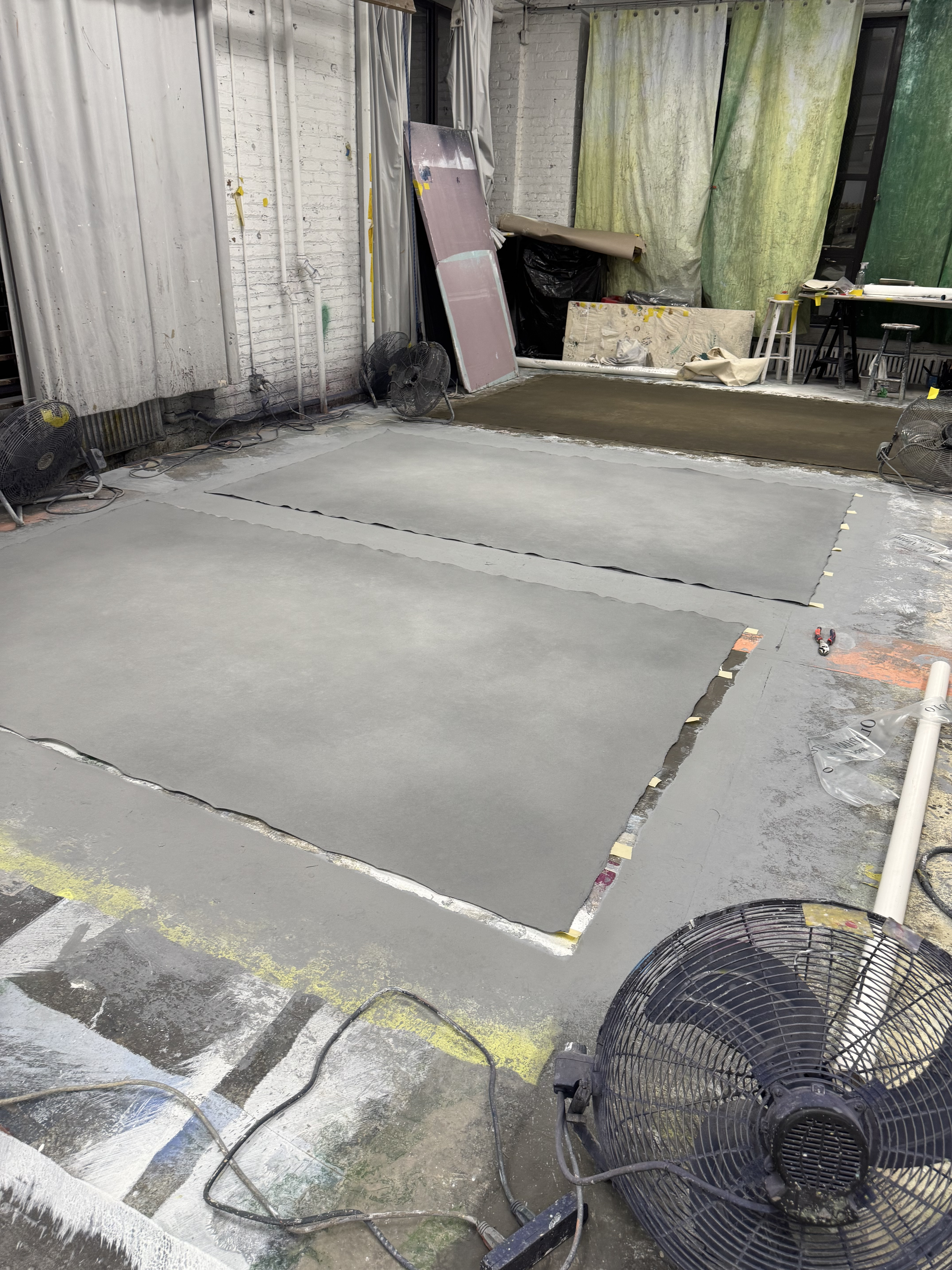
The workspace at Oliphant Studio, Brooklyn, New York (2025). Hand-painted photography backdrops in progress, showing the painting and drying process on the studio floor.

Oliphant hand-paints photorealistic backdrops for fashion photographers and shows. As an artist she created painted backdrops of sky, sea, sand, and city silhouettes for photographic magazine cover shots and advertisements.

Her backdrops have been used in magazines including Time magazine, Vogue and The New York Times Magazine. In 2016, her work was featured in portraits of Stephen Curry and LeBron James during the NBA Finals, highlighting the crossover of her artistry into popular culture.

Her studio has been used as a resource for photographers and designers, with its archive remaining active in the fashion and portrait industries.

== Oliphant Studio ==
She established Oliphant Studio in 1978 to supply photographers with custom and rental canvases, many of which are characterized by painterly textures and subtle gradations of color. Oliphant Studio provided support for Ana Sui's show at the Museum of Art and Design.
