= Francis Wilson Oliphant =

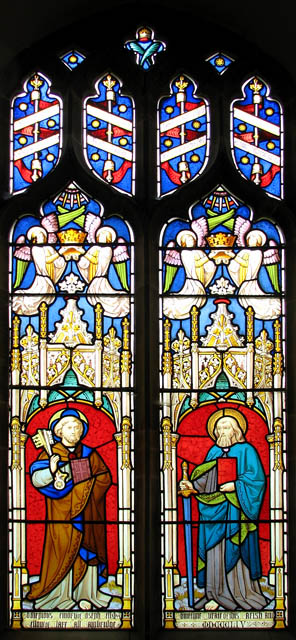
Stained glass depicting St Peter and St Paul, by Oliphant at Forncett St Peter, Norfolk

Francis Wilson Oliphant (28 September 1818 – 20 October 1859) was a British painter and designer of stained glass.

== Life ==
Oliphant was born in Gateshead in County Durham in 1818, son of Thomas Oliphant, a glass-cutter originally from Edinburgh, and his wife Margery. He was trained as an artist at the Edinburgh Academy of Art. In early life the revival of Gothic style and ornament led him to make a study of ecclesiastical art, visiting cathedrals in northern Europe. He worked for Ballantine and Allan in Edinburgh, and afterwards for William Wailes of Newcastle upon Tyne, where he was chief designer.

He moved to London, and worked with Pugin & Pugin, especially on the painted windows in the new Houses of Parliament. He also sent in a cartoon to the competition for the decoration of Westminster Hall, which was not successful. During this period Oliphant exhibited several pictures in the Royal Academy of Art, particularly a large Shakespearean study of the interview between Richard II and John of Gaunt, and a picture of the Prodigal Son "Nearing Home".

His latter years were occupied with an energetic attempt to improve the art of painted glass by superintending the processes of execution as well as the design, for which he set up a small workshop. From this workshop he produced the windows in the ante-chapel of King's College, Cambridge, those in the chancel of St Mary the Virgin's Church, Aylesbury, and several in Ely Cathedral. The choristers' window at Ely was the joint work of Oliphant and William Dyce, the former being responsible for the original design. He published in 1856 a small treatise entitled A Plea for Painted Glass.

His work was interrupted by ill-health: he developed tuberculosis in 1857, which obliged him to seek a warmer climate. With his family he moved to Rome in January 1859. He died there on 20 October 1859, and was buried in the English cemetery in Rome.

== Family ==
In 1852 he married his cousin Margaret Oliphant Wilson, who was beginning to be known as a writer. They had two sons. Cyril Francis Oliphant (1856–1890), who graduated B.A. at Balliol College, Oxford, published in 1890 a biography and criticism of the work of Alfred de Musset. Francis Romano Oliphant (1859–1894), born in Rome after his father's death, graduated B.A. at Oxford and issued in 1891 "Notes of a Pilgrimage to Jerusalem and the Holy Land", which originally appeared as letters addressed to The Spectator. He was a frequent contributor to that and other periodicals, and aided his mother in the preparation of her Victorian Age of Literature (1892).
