= Monica Oliphant =

British-Australian academic and physicist

Monica Oliphant AO
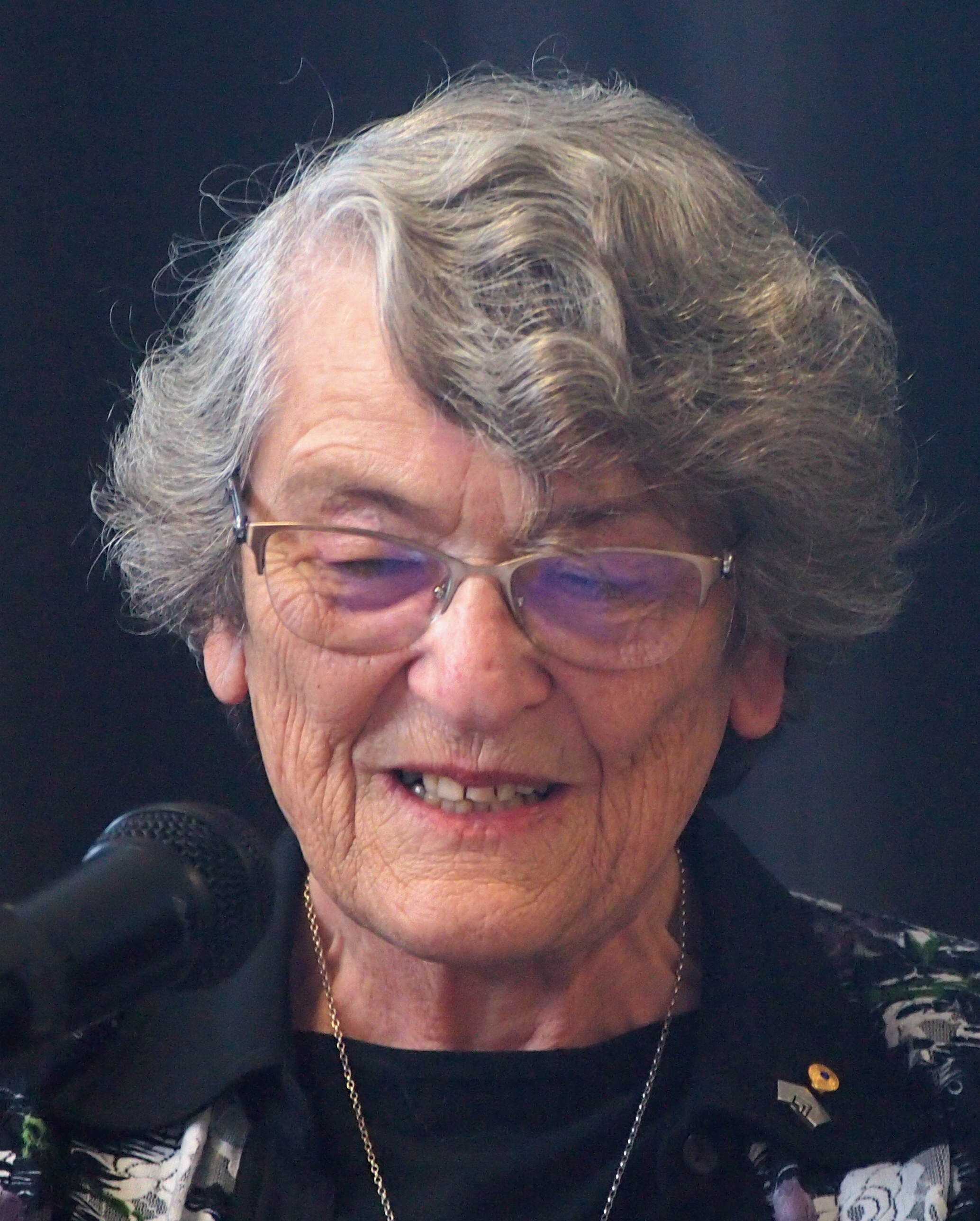
- Monica Oliphant speaking at an awards ceremony in 2016
- Born: Monica Viviene Kammer; 4 August 1940 (age 86); Ilford, Essex, England, United Kingdom
- Citizenship: Australian
- Education: University of London; University of Adelaide
- Spouse: Michael Oliphant
- Scientific career
- Fields: Physics
- Workplaces: University of South Australia

Monica Viviene Oliphant AO (née Kammer; born 4 August 1940 in Ilford) is a British–Australian research scientist, specialising in solar energy.

== Career ==
Oliphant began her scientific career with a master's degree in physics from the University of London and worked for almost 20 years as an energy research scientist for the Electricity Trust of South Australia, but since 2000 has been an independent consultant specialising in residential energy efficiency and renewable energy. Oliphant attributes her interest in solar energy from hearing Sir Macfarlane Burnet in the 1970s claiming that "if we used solar energy we would not need to fight over oil" – this sparked a career of over 40 years in the renewable energy industry. Key to her work was the belief that sustainable energy should be available to everyone and she claimed to be most proud of her work monitoring the effect of energy efficient devices on low income households in Australia, as well as being part of the Australian Federal Government's first Mandatory Renewable Energy Target (MRET) which enabled Renewable Energy Certificates (RECs), helping make small scale renewable energy more affordable.

Oliphant was President of the International Solar Energy Society from 2008 to 2009 and is an adjunct associate professor at the University of South Australia.

== Honors and awards ==
2002 – South Australia Great Environmental Award
2012 – World Renewable Energy Network Pioneer Award
2011 – Most Outstanding Contribution to the Clean Energy Industry, Ecogen
2015 – Officer of the Order of Australia – presented for services to the renewable energy research in solar photovoltaics.
2016 – Senior South Australian of the Year
