= Caputh =

Caputh may refer to the following places:

- Caputh, Brandenburg, a village in Brandenburg, Germany
- Caputh, Perth and Kinross, a village in Perth and Kinross, Scotland
