= George Pirie (mathematician) =

19/20th-century Scottish mathematician

George Pirie (19 July 1843 – 21 August 1904) was a Scottish mathematician, mathematical scientist, and Reverend in the Church of Scotland. He was an expert in the field of dynamics and the approximation of π.

== Early life and education ==
Pirie was the son of Very Rev William Robinson Pirie and his wife, Margaret Chalmers Forbes, daughter of Very Rev Lewis William Forbes. He was born in the manse at Dyce near Aberdeen on 19 July 1843.

He was educated at Aberdeen Grammar School. He then studied Mathematics and Physics (then called Natural Philosophy) at The University of Aberdeen under Prof David Thomson. He graduated MA in 1862. He then won a place at Queens' College, Cambridge. He was Fifth Wrangler in the Mathematical Tripos of 1866.

== Career ==
Pirie was a Fellow of Queens' College from 1866 to 1888. He lectured at Cambridge from 1866 and in 1878 was offered the chair as Professor of Mathematics at Aberdeen University in replacement of Prof Frederick Fuller.

Pirie was elected a member of the London Mathematical Society in November 1881. He also took part in the activities of the Aberdeen Branch of the Royal Scottish Geographical Society. Since 1881 he was also a member of the Aberdeen Philosophical Society, and served as a Vice-President of the society in 1900.

== Personal life ==
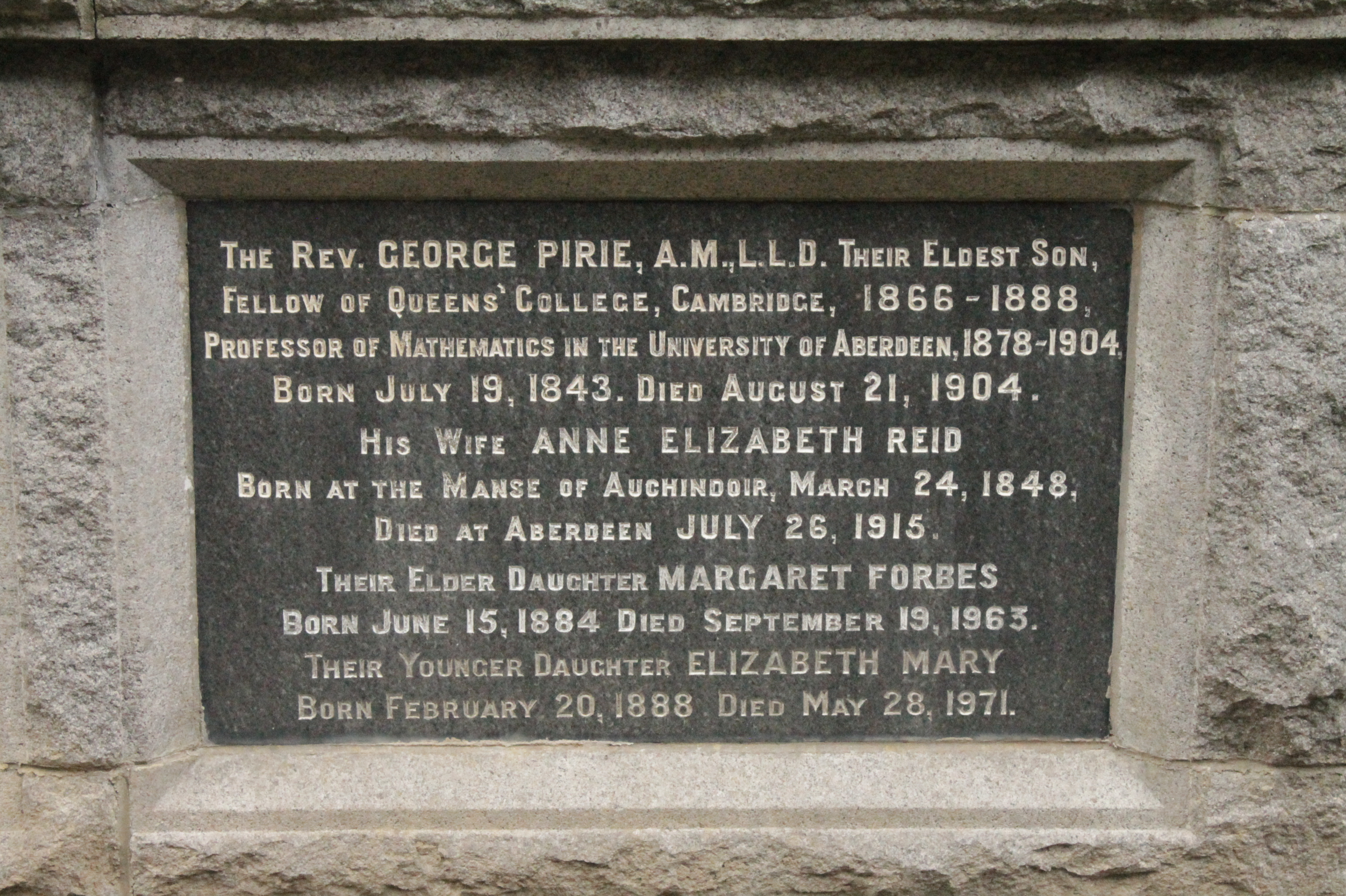
The grave of Rev George Pirie, St Machar's Cathedral

He lived at 33 College Bounds close to King's College in Old Aberdeen.

He was married to Anne Elizabeth Reid daughter of Rev Reid of Auchindoir. Their children included Margaret Forbes Pirie (1884–1963) and Elizabeth Mary Pirie (1888–1971).

He died unexpectedly at Braemar on 21 August 1904, from heart failure. He is buried next to his parents on the north side of St Machar's Cathedral in Old Aberdeen.

== Recognition ==
He was awarded an honorary doctorate (LL.D) by St. Andrews University in 1896.

== Publications ==
- George Pirie (1875). Lessons on Rigid Dynamics. London: MacMillan and Co. p. 20. "Lessons on Rigid Dynamics."
- A Short Account of the Principal Geometrical Methods of Approximating to the Value of π
