= William Robinson Pirie =

Scottish minister (1804–1885)

The Very Reverend William Robinson Pirie

Principal of the University of Aberdeen
- In office 1876–1885
- Preceded by: Reverend Peter Colin Campbell
- Succeeded by: Sir William Duguid Geddes

Personal details
- Born: 26 July 1804 Slains, Aberdeenshire, Scotland
- Died: 3 November 1885 (aged 81) Aberdeen, Aberdeenshire, Scotland
- Spouse: Margaret Chalmers Forbes (m. 1842)
- Children: 8 including George
- Education: University of Aberdeen
- Profession: Minister and Principal

William Robinson Pirie (1804–1885) was a Scottish minister who served as Principal of Aberdeen University. He served as Moderator of the General Assembly of the Church of Scotland in 1864, the highest position in the Church of Scotland. He actively campaigned for the cessation of the link between landowners and the church, generally termed “patronage” which officially ceased in UK in 1874. He was the Principal of the University of Aberdeen from 1876-1885.

== Life ==
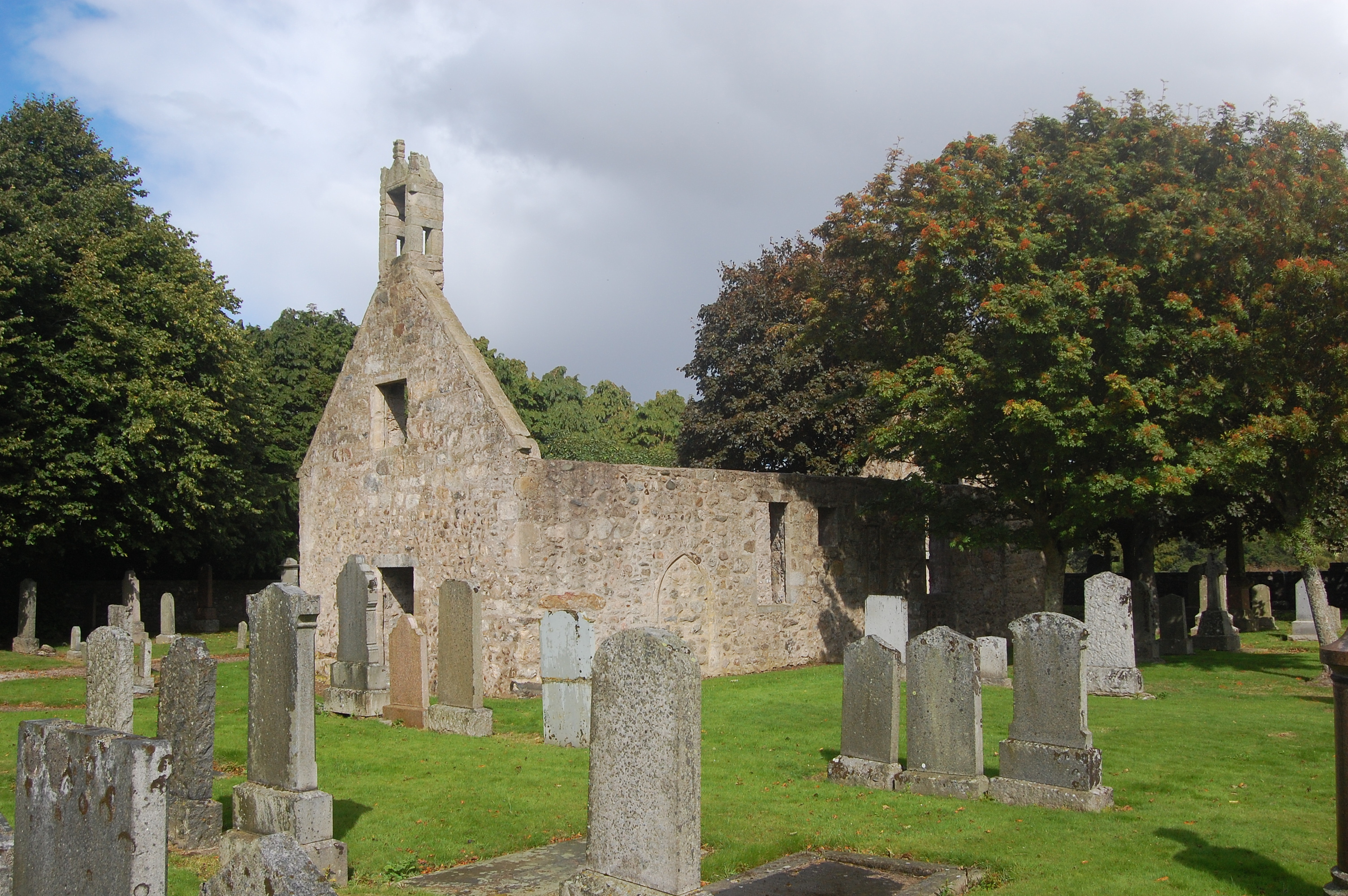
Old Parish Church of Dyce

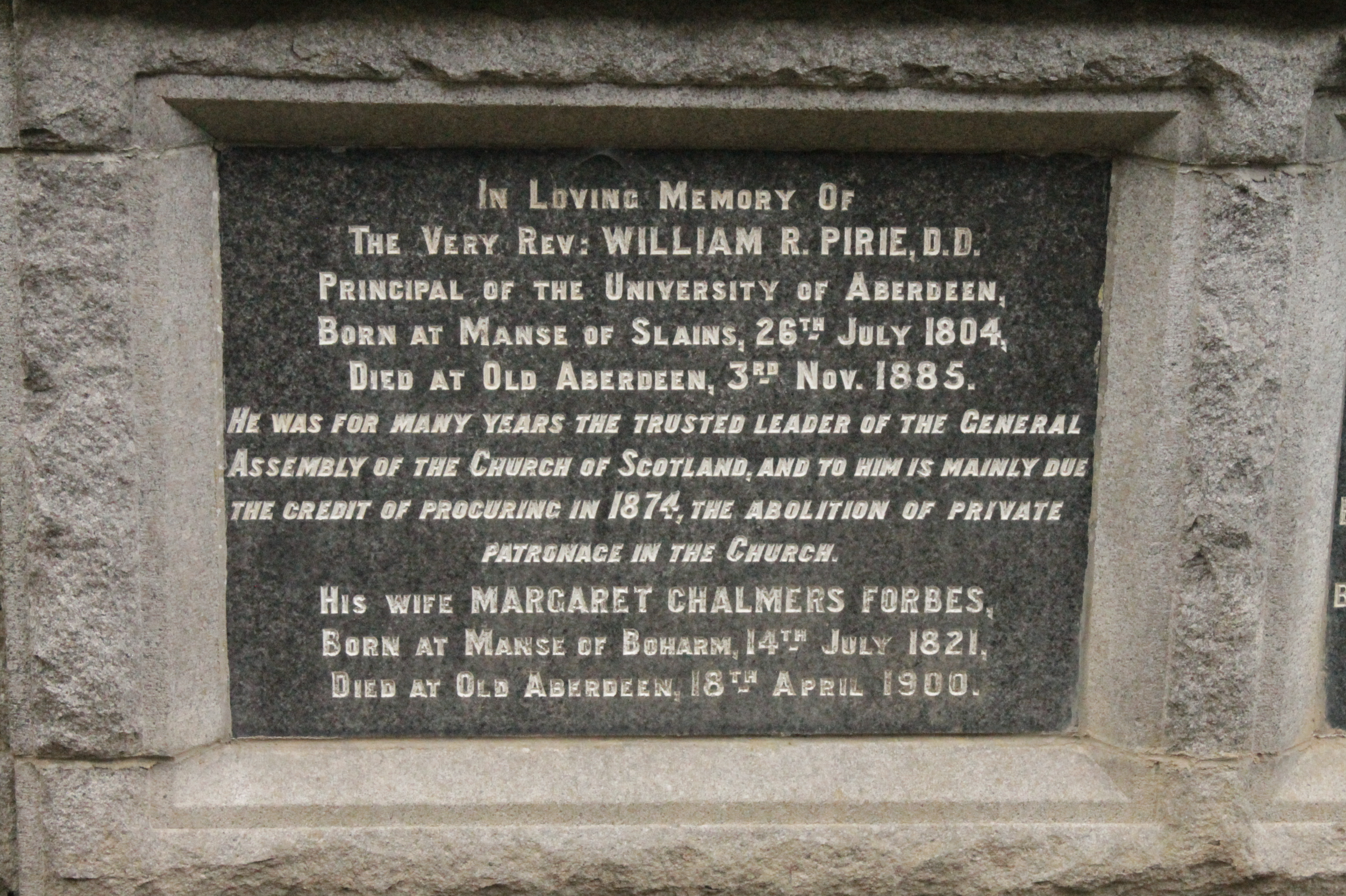
grave of Very Rev William Pirie, St Machar's Cathedral churchyard

He was born in the manse at Slains, north of Aberdeen on 26 July 1804, the son of Rev George Pirie (1761–1826), the local minister, and his wife, May Forbes Robinson (died 1835). He studied law at Aberdeen University from 1817 to 1821, but did not graduate. From 1821 he studied divinity and graduated M.A. He was licensed to preach in 1825.

His first ministry was in Ellon, Aberdeenshire. In 1830 he was presented by General Gordon Cumming Skene (as patron) to the parish of Dyce, where he remained until 1845.

In 1843 he became professor of divinity at Aberdeen University (whilst still minister of Dyce, which is nearby). He was given an honorary doctorate (DD) the following year. He was then living at 142 King Street in Aberdeen. In 1876 he became Principal of the university in place of Rev Prof Peter Colin Campbell. In 1846 he was translated from Dyce to Greyfriars Church, Aberdeen.

He died in Aberdeen on 3 November 1885 and is buried with his wife and children in St Machar's Cathedral Churchyard in Aberdeen. The grave lies in the narrow section on the north side of the church.

== Family ==
In March 1842 he married Margaret Chalmers Forbes (1821-1900), daughter of Very Rev Lewis William Forbes minister of Boharm and later the Moderator in 1852. They had eight children. His brother-in-law through this marriage was the war correspondent Archibald Forbes.

Their son George Pirie became Professor of Mathematics at Aberdeen University. His eldest son, also William Robinson Pirie, became minister of Nairn.

== Publications ==
- The Independent Jurisdiction of the Church Vindicated (1838)
- Account of the Parish of Dyce (1843)
- An Inquiry into the Constitution, Powers and Processes of the Human Mind (1856)
- The Position, Principles and Duties of the Church of Scotland (1864)
- High Churchism (1872)
- The God of Reason and Revelation (1892-posthumous)

Academic offices
Preceded by Reverend Peter Colin Campbell	Principal and Vice-Chancellor of the University of Aberdeen; 1876—1885	Succeeded by Sir William Duguid Geddes
