= David Gill (astronomer) =

Scottish astronomer (1843–1914)

Sir David Gill KCB FRS FRSE FRAS
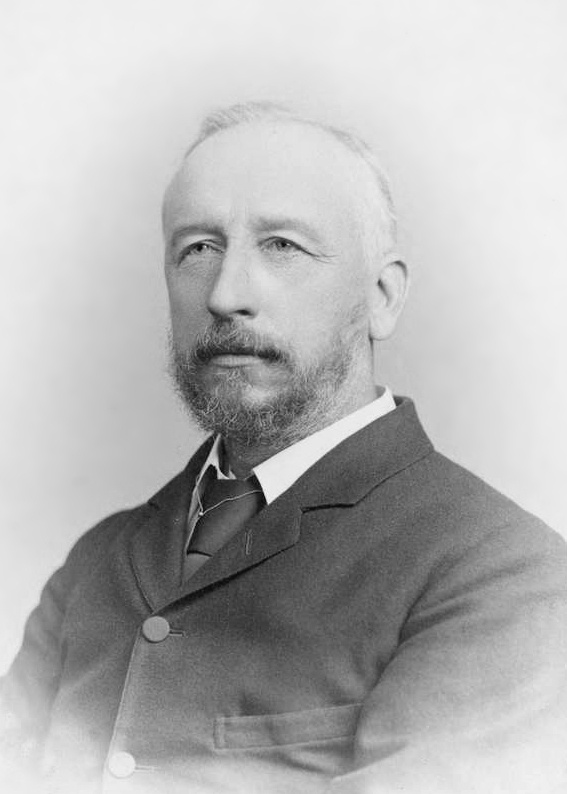
- Born: 12 June 1843; Aberdeen, Scotland
- Died: 24 January 1914 (aged 70); London, England
- Resting place: Aberdeen
- Education: University of Aberdeen
- Occupation: Astronomer
- Title: FRS; LL.D. CB; KCB
- Spouse: Isobel Sarah Gill
- Awards: Bruce Medal (1900); Valz Prize (1881); Gold Medal of the Royal Astronomical Society; James Craig Watson Medal (1899); Commandeur de la Légion d'honneur Pour le Mérite

Sir David Gill (12 June 1843 – 24 January 1914) was a Scottish astronomer who spent most of his career as H.M. Astronomer at the Cape of Good Hope. He was born in Aberdeen, trained as a watch and clock-maker, and spent ten years in the family business, which he took over from his father. He became a noted amateur astronomer, and was invited by Lord Lindsay to manage his private observatory, which he accepted, selling the family business. He took part in astronomical expeditions to Mauritius and Ascension Island, before being appointed to the Cape in 1879. He was particularly noted for his observations with the heliometer, using this instrument for measurement of parallax in order to determine distances, both from the earth to the sun (solar parallax) and from our solar system to other stars (stellar parallax). At the Cape, he developed the observatory, making it a world-class institution. He was a pioneer of astrophotography, and used photographic methods to create a star atlas of the southern hemisphere, and also supported and took part in the world-wide Carte du Ciel star-mapping project. He was a meticulous observer, taking great trouble to identify and eliminate systematic sources of error. He was a proponent of international cooperation, supporting international projects and collaborating with many of the other leading astronomers of his day. He helped initiate a geodetic survey of Southern Africa which eventually connected with North cape to provide the longest meridian arc in the world, providing a basis for cartography, navigation and astronomical observations.

== Early life and education ==
David Gill was born at 48 Skene Terrace in Aberdeen the son of David Gill, watchmaker and his wife Margaret Mitchell. He was educated first at Bellevue Academy in Aberdeen then at Dollar Academy. He was sent to Dollar Academy in 1857, at the age of fourteen, and boarded with Dr. Lindsay. Gill described Lindsay as an inspiring influence, whose teaching "filled me with the love of mathematics, physics and chemistry". He spent two years at Marischal College, Aberdeen where his teachers included James Clerk Maxwell. Another important influence at university was Prof David Thomson. In 1863 they jointly repaired the university clock and both set up a new mechanical telescope at the Cromwell Tower Observatory. This was his introduction to astronomy.

== Clocks and watches ==
In 1860, Gill's father, who was 71 years old, insisted that David should join the family business, with a view to taking it over in due course. Gill, who had been thinking of a career in science, "very unwillingly yielded" to this request. He spent the years 1861-1862 learning the watchmaker's trade, travelling to the great centres for the manufacture of clocks and watches in Switzerland, and then in Coventry and Clerkenwell. In his later life as an astronomer, he greatly valued the technical skills he had learnt at this time In 1863 he became a member of the British Horological Institute and in the same year was made a junior partner in the family firm, which became known as David Gill & Son.

Also in 1863 Gill became aware that Aberdeen did not have an accurate time standard. Edinburgh used a time ball on top of Nelson's Monument in Edinburgh to give a time signal to the ships at Edinburgh's port of Leith. By 1861, this visual signal was augmented by the One O'Clock Gun at Edinburgh Castle. Gill obtained an introduction to Charles Piazzi Smyth, who had introduced these systems, from David Thomson, Professor at the University of Aberdeen. In Edinburgh, Piazzi Smyth showed him not just the timing system but all the instruments in the observatory, and how they were used. This was his introduction to astromomy. Back in Edinburgh, Gill and Thomson repaired the university clock and re-installed an old transit instrument in King's College, Old Aberdeen. This was used to establish sidereal time to calibrate a local clock. This was modified to send time signals which were used to control the main university clock.

In 1866 or 1867 he bought his own telescope, and set up a small observatory in his father's garden. The telescope was a silver on glass reflector with 12 inch aperture and 10 foot focal length. He designed the mounting and had it built by a local shipbuilder. He made the driving clock himself. With this telescope he carried out micrmetric measurements of double stars and for observations of nebulae. He also used this telescope for photography, taking one of the earliest quality photographs of the moon in 1869.

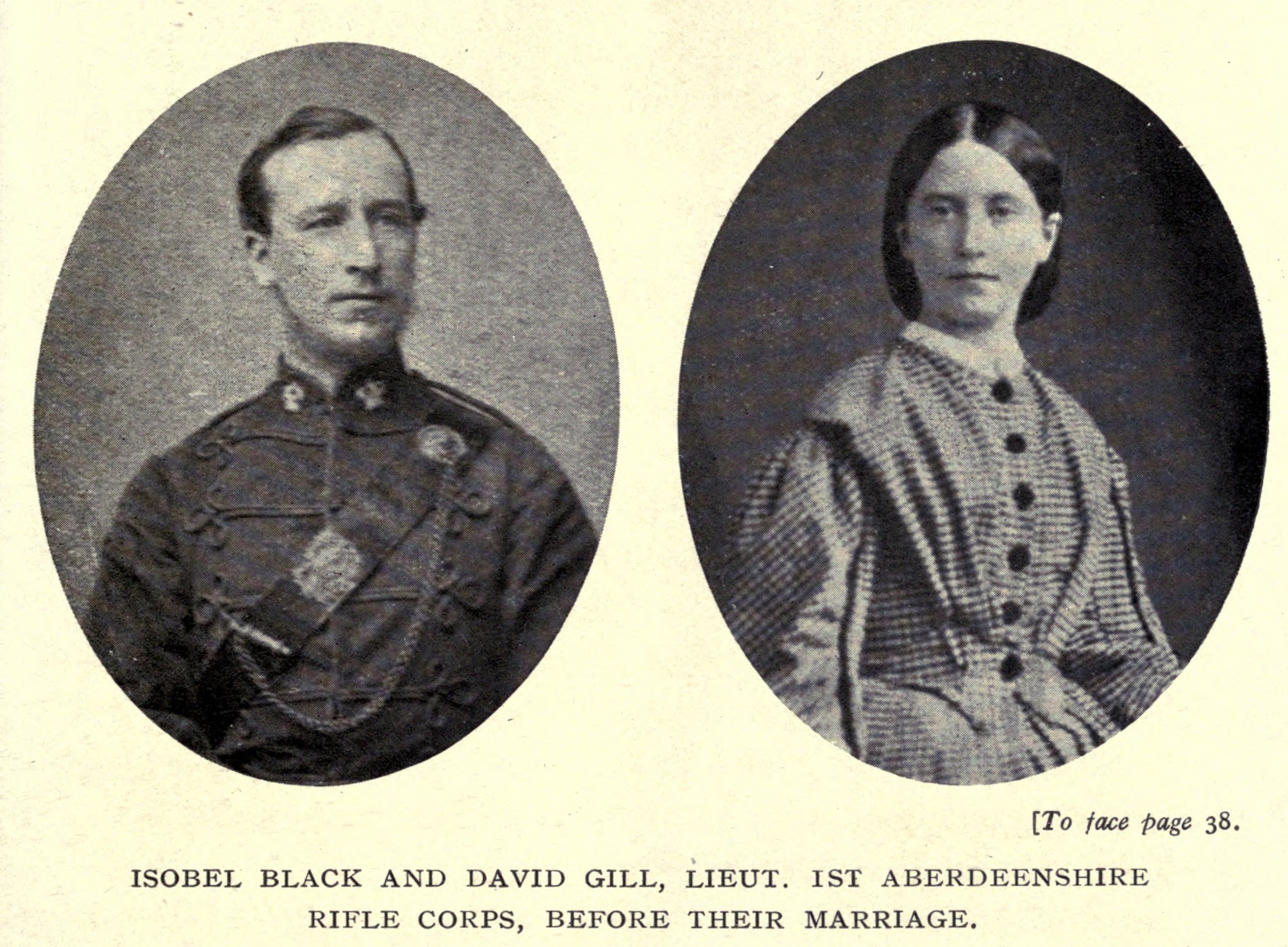
Isobel Black and David Gill before their marriage

In 1869, Gill's father handed over full control of the business to his son, which gave him much more financial security. The next year he married Isobel Black, who he had first met five years earlier in her home village of Foveran.

== Lord Lindsay and Dun Echt ==
Gill had acquired a considerable local reputation with his astronomical work, and this had come to the notice of Lord Lindsay, who had been interested in astronomy from an early age. He first met Gill when he asked to see his photographs of the moon, and the two became close friends. In 1872, Gill received a lettter from Lindsay's father, the Earl of Crawford offering him a position in charge of the observatory they were planning to establish at Dun Echt, near Aberdeen. Gill seized this opportunity to devote his time solely to science, accepted the offer, and sold the family business. He then began work on supervising building work and equipping the observatory. The design and equipment of the observatory was influenced by the description of the Pulkovo Observatory in Russia, described by its first director F.G.W. Struve.

In 1873 Gill travelled via Copenhagen and Stockholm to St Petersburg and then to Pulkovo, where Otto Struve, son of F.G.W. Struve, showed him the observatory. He then travelled with Struve to Hamburg for the Astronomical Society meeting, where he first met Simon Newcomb, Arthur Auwers and Friedrich Winnecke, who would become valued collaborators. Back in Scotland, as well as his work on the new observatory, which included overseeing the construction of a house for himself and Isobel, Gill was involved in planning and equipping an expedition to Mauritius to observe the transit of Venus, which would occur on 9 December 1874, to determine the astronomical unit, (AU, the distance of the earth from the sun). This was a private expedition, funded by Lord Lindsay, and independent of the national expeditions, though co-operating with them in a number of ways.

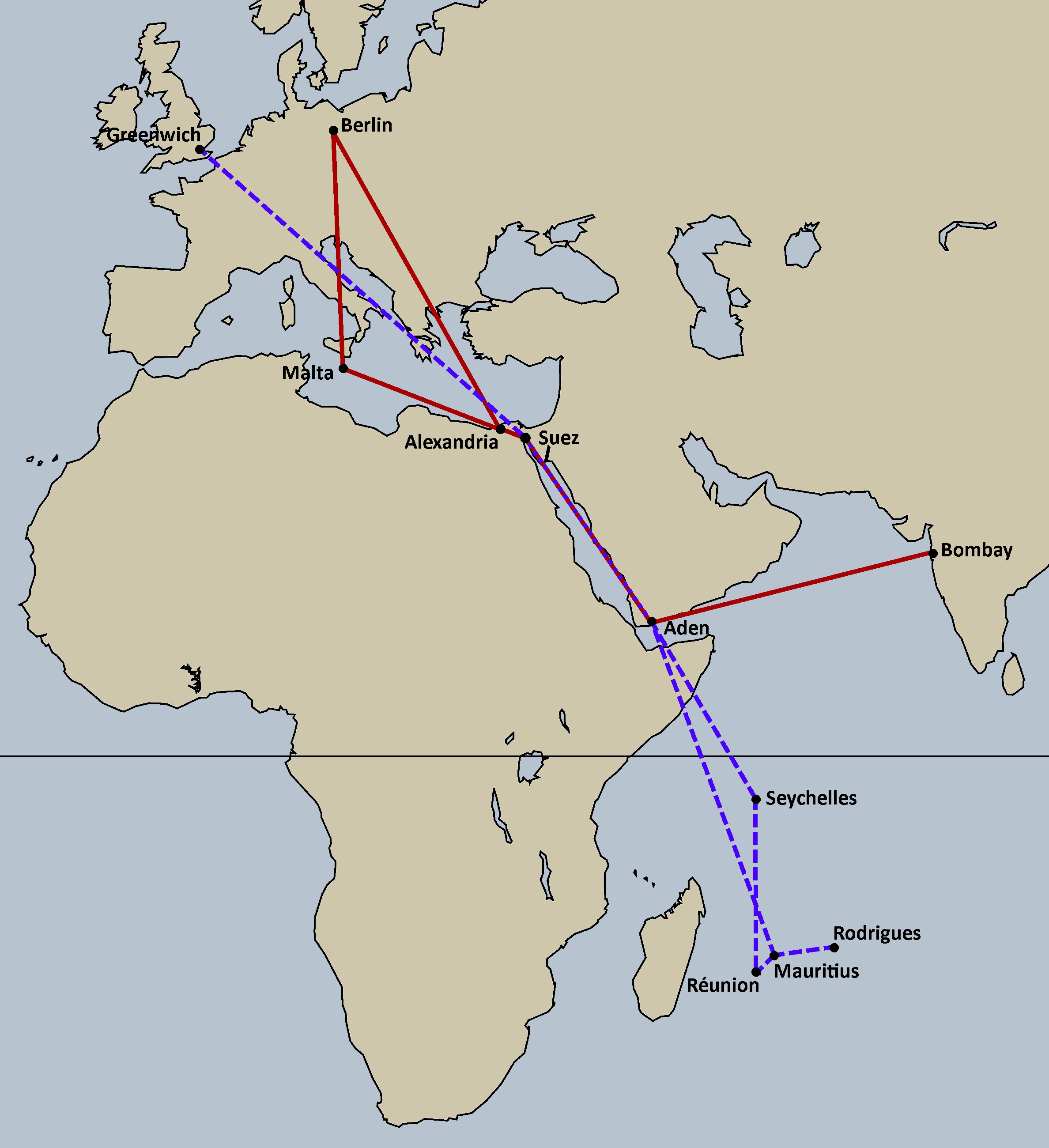
Map showing the chain of longitude determinations in 1874. Solid red: telegraph; dashed blue: chronometer. Both methods were used for the Suez to Aden link.

It was necessary to establish the exact location of the observation stations in order to analyse the results of the transit observations. The most accurate method for longitude measurement at the time used telegraphic signals for time determination. Mauritius had no telegraph link, so Gill organised a chain of telegraphic longitude determinations to Aden, with extension to Mauritius by chronometer. Fifty chronometers were used, which Gill transported from Liverpool, where they had been calibrated, by rail to Southampton, P&O steamer to Aden via the Suez Canal, then on another steamer to Mauritius, arriving on 4 August, after a journey of seven weeks. Observations were made on both outward and return journeys, and positions determined for a number of locations in the Indian Ocean. In the Seychelles, Gill was helped by Captain William Wharton in HMS Shearwater who was supporting the British transit expedition, and beginning his survey of east Africa. Wharton would become a close friend and ally. Within Mauritius, there were three observation stations, Pamplemousses (official British expedition), Solitude (German), and Belmont (Lindsay). Longitude determinations between the three stations were carried out using field telegraph, chronometers, and timings of rockets. On the return journey Dr Löw of the German expedition travelled to Suez, and collaborated in observations and exchange of telegraph signals with Gill in Aden. Arthur Auwers in Berlin assisted in the determination between Malta and Berlin, providing a second link to Suez via Alexandtia.

As well as carrying out observations of the transit, Lindsay's expedition had an additional objective, determination of the AU by diurnal parallax observations on the minor planet Juno. As the earth rotates, the apparent position of a nearby object, in this cae Juno, changes relative to the much more distant stars. By measuring this change between evening to dawn, the distance to Juno can be determined, and as the relative dimensions of the orbits in the solar system were already known, the AU could be calculated. The measurements were made with a heliometer, a specialised telescope which used an adjustable split image to assess angular distances. Heliometers had been used to measure the diameter of the sun (hence the name) and the separation between double stars, but its use for measuring parallax was an innovation, and was important because it eliminated the difficulties of accurate timing of the ingress and egress of Venus in transit, due to effects of Venus's atmosphere, and because it did not depend on rare events. Transits of Venus occur in pairs with intervals of over a century between one pair and the next. Parallax observations required the target to be at opposition, that is at its closest to earth, which is much more common. Juno is at opposition about every 16 months, and there are other asteroids that can be used, as well as the planet Mars. Another advantage of diurnal parallax measurement is that it does not require observers thouasands of miles apart. As Isobel Gill remarked, a single observer and his observatory can be carried by the rotation of the earth 6,000 or 7,000 miles between the times of his morning and evening observations.

Observation from a station close to the equator was desired, because the distance between morning and evening positions is greatest at the equator. There was an opposition scheduled for October 1874. However, while Gill was on Mauritius at that time, Lord Lindsay was sailing in his own boat, Venus around the Cape, with much of the expedition's equipment including the heliometer. Delayed by bad weather, he did not arrive in Mauritius until 2 November. Fortunately this was in time to make a series of parallax observations that gave a good result, and proved the practicality of the method. Most of the observation work in Mauritius was carried out by Gill, as Lindsay was in poor health after the voyage. While in Mauritius, Gill first met the French surveyor and astronomer Ernest Mouchez, who would become an important collaborator.

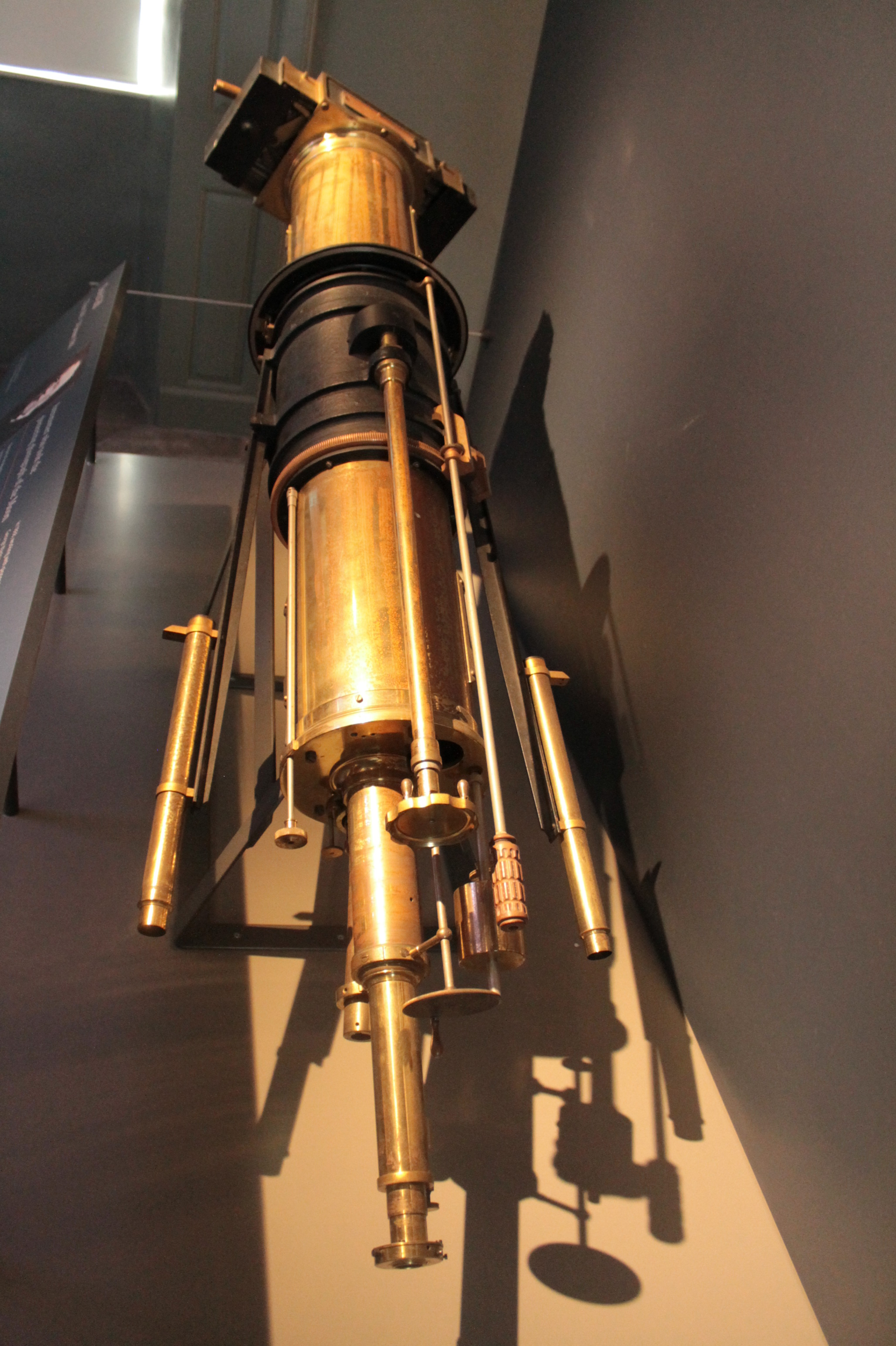
David Gill's heliometer, Provost Skene's House Museum, Aberdeen

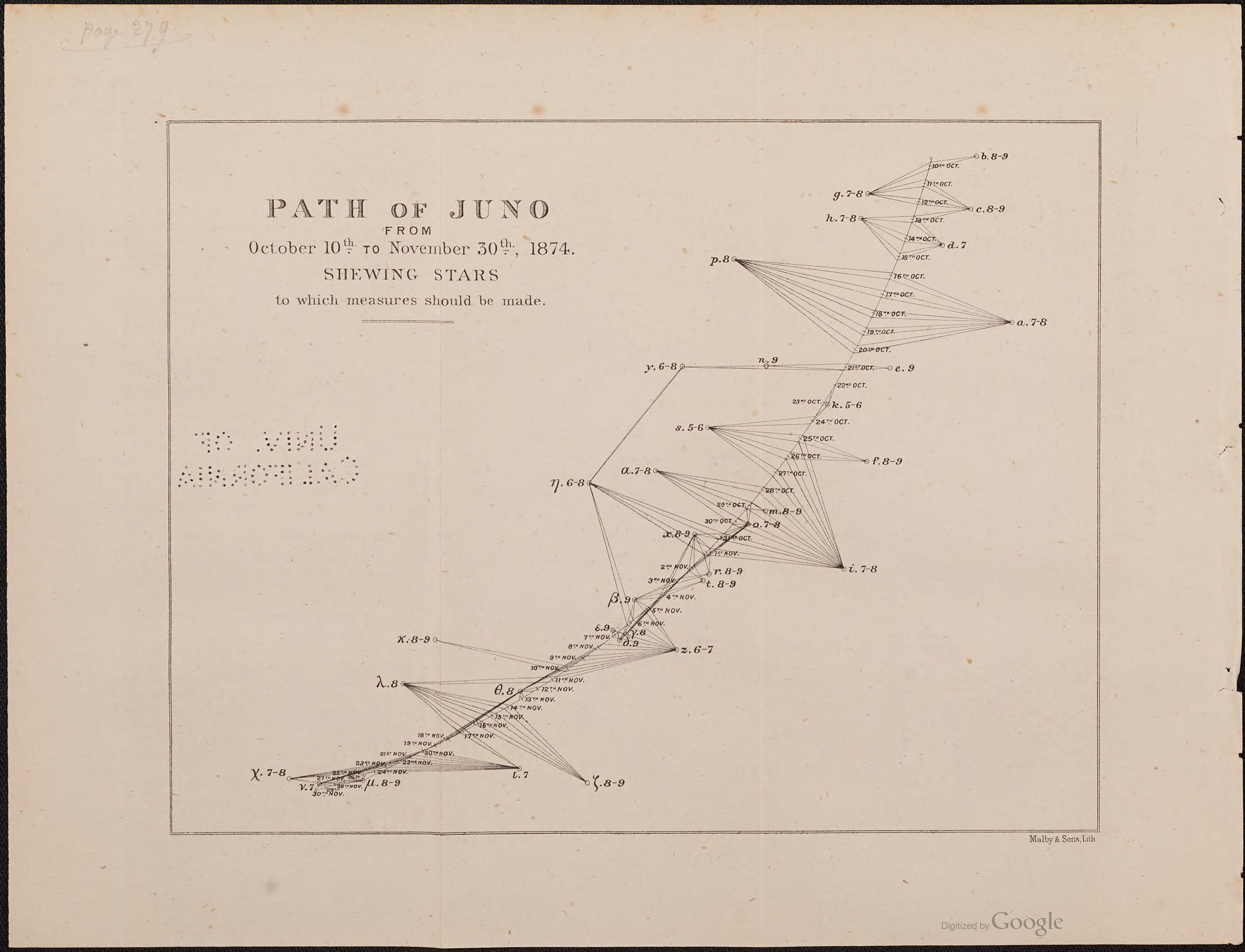
Path of Juno showing the stars to be used for measurement of parallax.

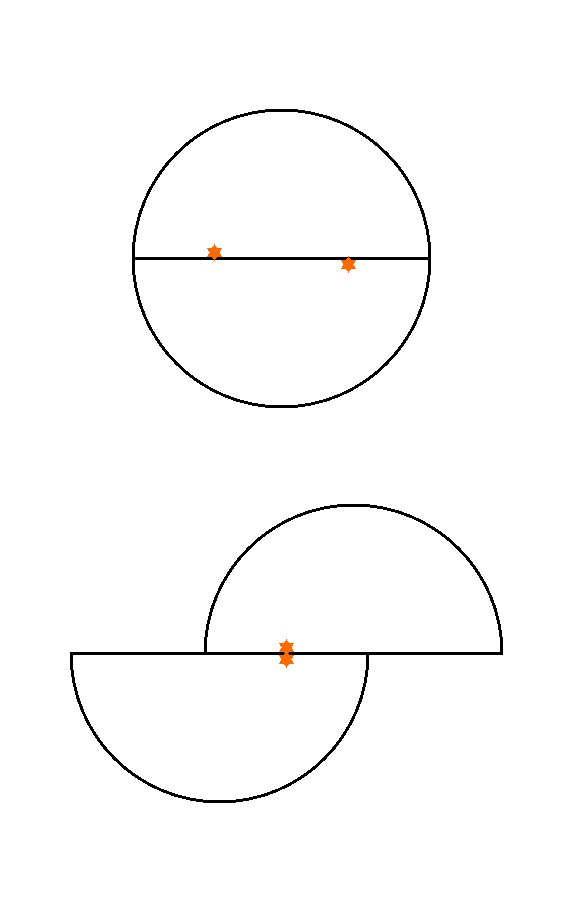
Measurement with a heliometer. Top: segments in undisplaced position; bottom: segments displaced to bring the two objects into alignment. The displacement is read from a micrometer to give the angular distance between objects, and thus the parallax

Gill returned to Dun Echt in mid-1875. His status and reputation as an astronomer had greatly increased due to his management of the expedition, his innovative work on solar parallax, and his cooperation with members of the various expeditions. He was frequently visited by colleagues, and this led to tension with Lady Crawford, Lord Lindsay's mother, who had not expected guests to arrive at their country estate with horses and carriages. Lindsay and Gill discussed the situation and it was mutually agreed to terminate Gill's contract at Dun Echt. There were personal difficulties between the two at the time, but no lasting break occurred. Gill and his wife remained at Dun Echt until mid-1876. Lindsay and Gill continued to cooperate and remained friends until Lindsay died the year before Gill. Gill spent much of his remaining time at Dun Echt calculating the results from the observations on the Mauritius expedition.

== Ascension Island ==
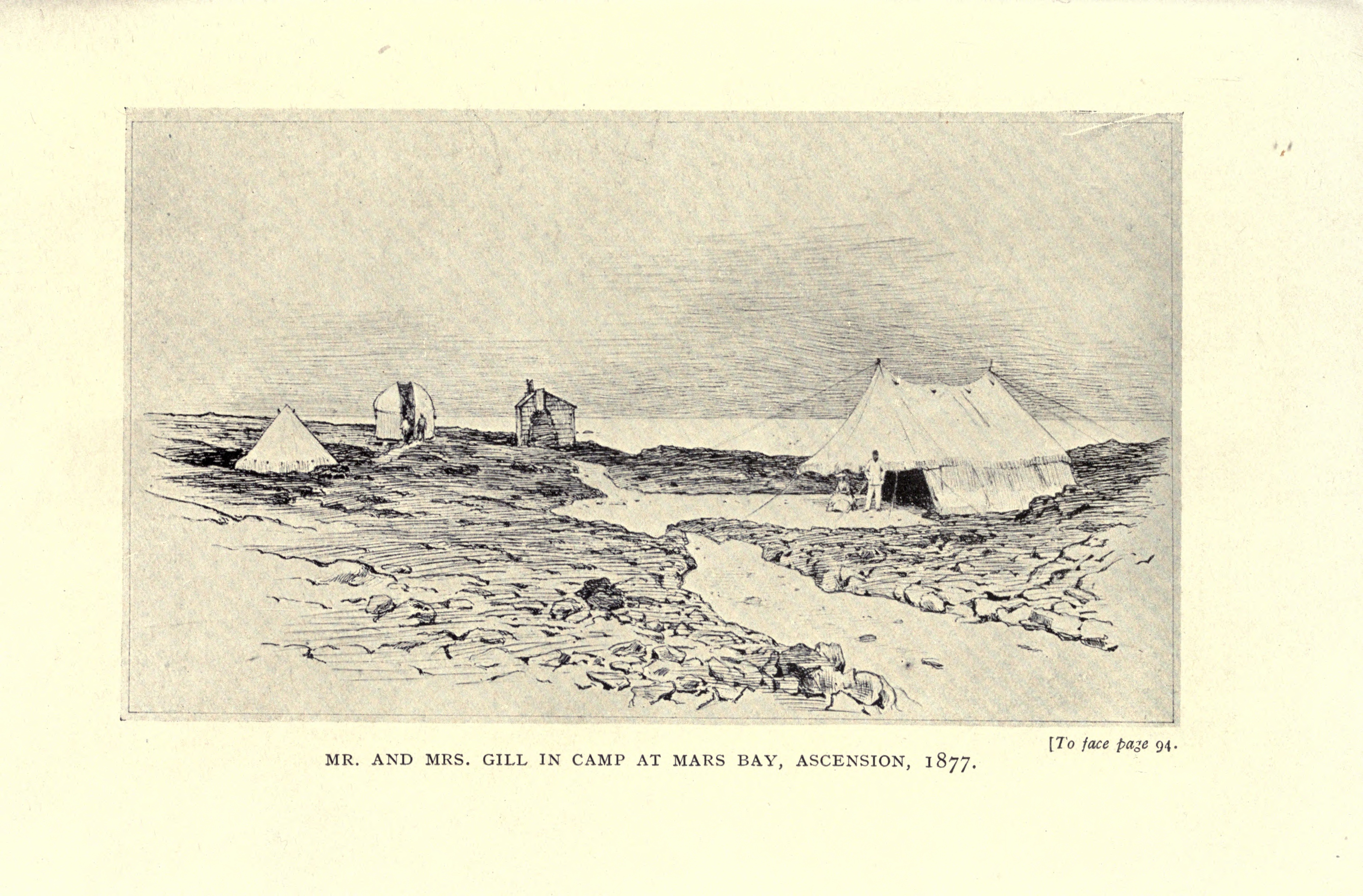
Camp at Mars Bay, Ascension Island, 1877

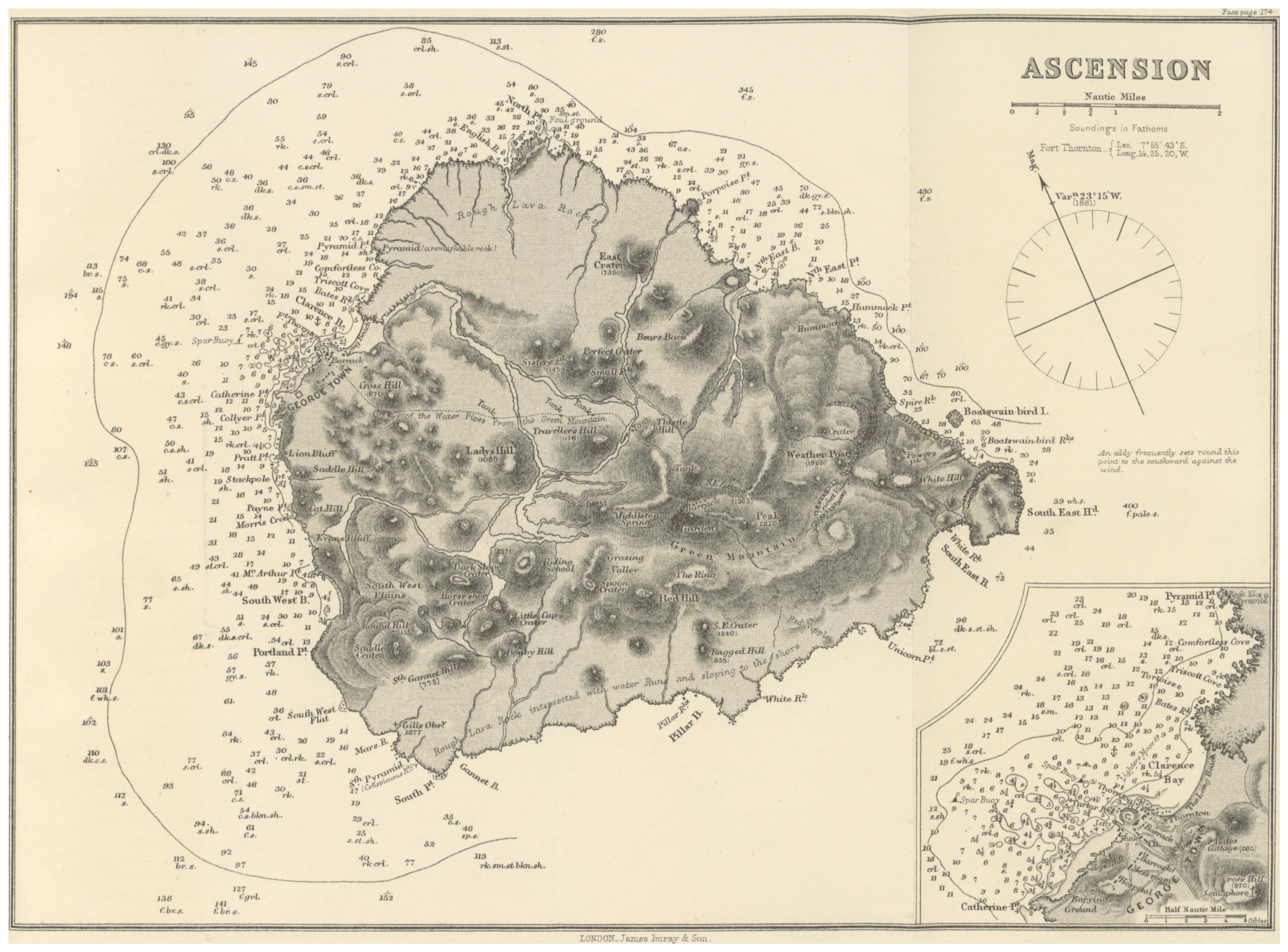
1884 Map of Ascension Island showing Georgetown, where the observatory was originally set up, and Mars Bay

The Gills moved to London in 1876, and Gill began planning his next project, determination of solar parallax by observations of Mars, which would be in close opposition in 1877. Ascension Island was selected as the observation station. Gill obtained Linsday's agreement to the loan of the heliometer, and secured funding in part from the Royal Astronomical Society, and in part from subscriptions by colleagues including the Astronomer Royal, Sir George Airy. He travelled to Ascension with Isobel, arriving there on 13 July 1877. The island was a naval base, and its commander Captain Phillimore arranged accommodation and assistance in setting up the instruments. However although Ascension had been chosen in part for its faourable weather, the skies remaind overcast for several weeks. On the hope that the clouds might be local, Isobel Gill set off to the other side of the island with two guides, and found that the skies were clear. All the equipment was packed, and transported to the windward side of the island. The new location was named Mars Bay. Although time had been lost, they were able to get enough observations to calculate an accurate value, and work was completed by 9 November. Isobel wrote an account of their time on Ascension.

The Gills returned to England on 24 January 1878. Gill spent a considerable time calculating the results. The resulting value for the AU became the accepted standard for many years. On 6 April his father died. David Gill had travelled to Aberdeen on hearing of his father's ilnness, and spent a month handling the estate. In May, the Rev. Robert Main, Observer at the Radcliffe, Oxford, died. Gill applied for the vacant position, but it was awarded to Edward Stone, Her Majesty's Astronomer at the Cape Observatory. Gill then applied for the position at the Cape, and this time he was successful, rather to his surprise, as the other candidate was William Christie, Chief Assistant at Greenwich, who had the support of Airy. Before travelling to the Cape, Gill visited the observatories of Paris, Leiden, Groningen, Hamburg, Copenhagen, Helsingfors, Pulkowa, Strasbourg and Paris. At Strasbourg he met Willliam Elkin, one of Winnecke's senior students who was working on stellar parallax. The two became friends, and Gill invited Elkin to visit and work at the Cape when he finished his degree.. The Gills then sailed for South Africa, arriving there in June 1879.

== Astronomer at the Cape ==
Over the following 27 years Gilll was to refurbish the Cape observatory completely, turning it into a first-rate institution. His first concern was with the astronomical instruments in the observatory. The first of these was the transit circle, used for determnining the time and altitude of a star as it passed the local meridian. The instrument at the Cape was almost identical to the Airy circle at the Royal Observatory, Greenwich. Gill found that the adjustment screws and the bearings of the instrument were badly worn, and the lenses fogged and deteriorated. Some parts had to be sent back to England for repair or replacement, others could be restored locally. The 7-inch equatorial telescope had similar problems, and the photo-heliometer was considered unusable. Gill was able to purchase the 4-inch heliometer that he had used on Ascension Island from Lord Lindsay, in order to continue his parallax observations.

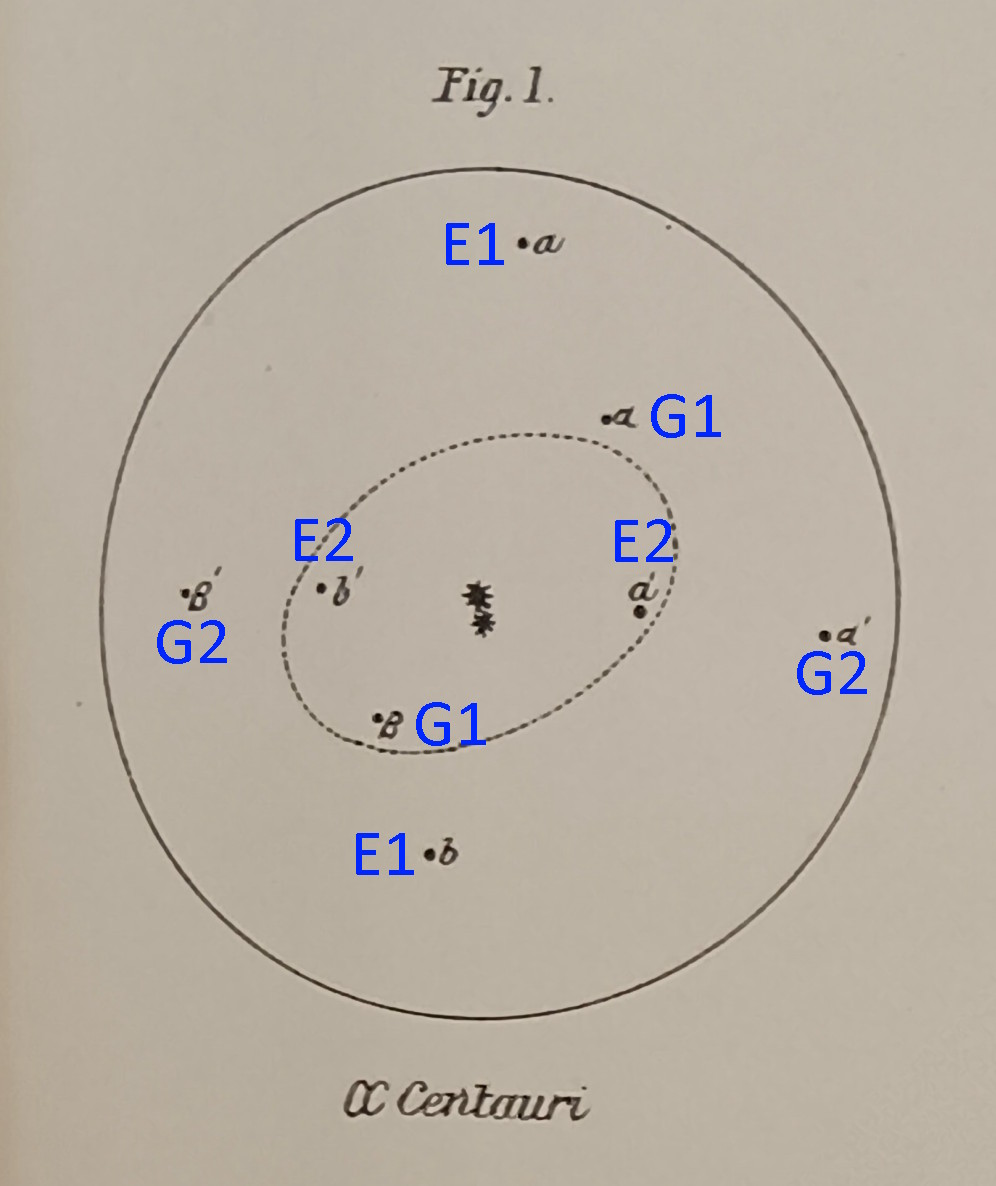
Reference stars used for parallax determination of α Centauri. Annotations in blue show Gill (G) and Elkin (E) series 1 and 2. From Gill and Elkin (1884) Plate 1.

The heliometer arrived at the Cape in December 1880, and Elkin arrived the following month for a visit that would last until May 1883. The pair then set out on a programme to determine the distance of a number of nearby stars, using the annual parallax from the orbital motion of the earth. Forbes describes this as the "first systematic attack ever undertaken on star distances". Gill's predecessor at the Cape, Thomas Henderson had been one of the first to demonstrate measurable parallax of a star, Alpha Centauri. Henderson's results had the limitation, which he himself acknowledged, that they were derived from measurements of star positions that were not intended for parallax determination. Robert Main, commenting on Henderson's results in 1840, remarked: "There cannot exist a doubt that the necessity of using other more delicate means of observation for the discovery of an inequality of so trifling amount, as is proved to exist in the case of the brightest of the stars of both hemispheres, will now be sufficiently impressed upon all astronomers." Gill and Elkin used the heliometer, the most delicate means of observation available, to measure the angular distances of a target from reference stars. They carried out 14 series of observations on 9 stars. Each series included observations made over at least a year, and in some cases up to 2 years. Each series used a pair of reference stars on either side of the target star. Where more than one series was carried out on a particular target, a different pair of reference stars was used for each series. For Alpha Centauri, there were four series, two by Gill, two by Elkin. The parallax of Alpha Centauri was found to be 0.75" ± 0.01. This is in good agreement with the modern value of 0.743".

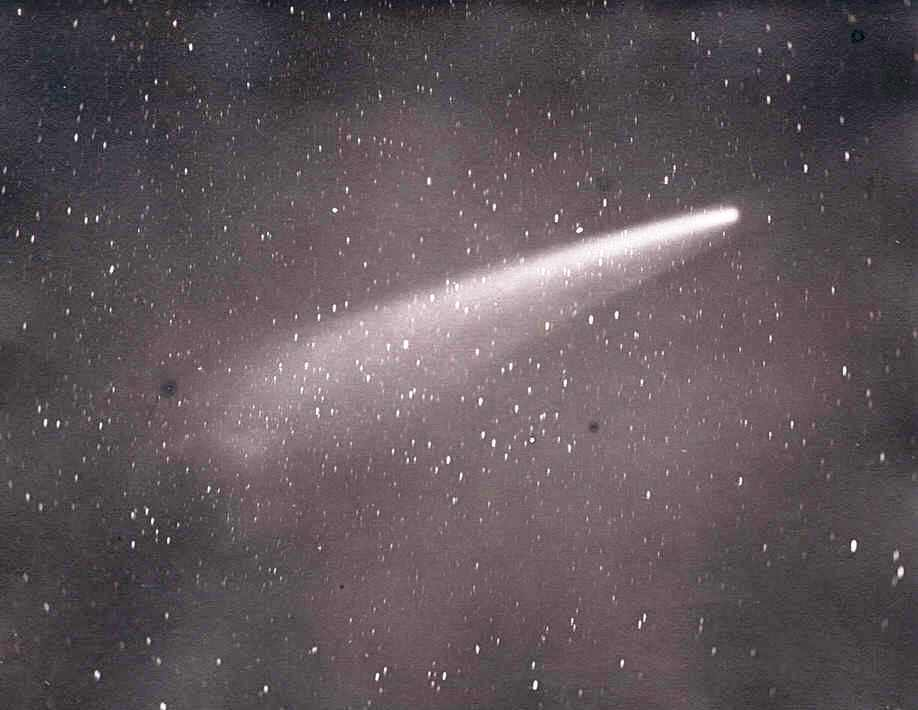
The Great Comet of 1882 photographed by Gill on 7 November

Gill was a pioneer in the use of astrophotography, making some of the first photographs of the Great Comet of 1882. This comet was bright enough to be seen in full sunlight. Gill had the idea of attaching an ordinary camera to the mounting of the equatorial telescope so that the clock-drive of the telescope moved the camera to follow the position of the comet in the sky. This allowed a sharp image of the comet to be obtained using an exposure of several hours. The motion of the comet relative to the fixed stars was slow, allowing images of many stars to be obtained. The number and definition of the stars that could be seen, despite the low power of the lens used, suggested the possibility of using photography, with more powerful equipment, for star mapping. He soon obtained higher quality lenses and confirmed the practicality of the idea. The other innovation that enabled this advance was the invention of dry plate photography by R.L. Maddox.

A comprehensive star catalogue of northern skies had been available since 1863. The Bonner Durchmusterung (Bonn Survey), started by Friedrich Argelander in 1852 listed all stars down to magnitude 9.5 in the northern hemisphere with some observations further south to allow connections to future charts. Gill proposed a continuation of this survey into the southern hemisphere using photographic methods. He obtained initial funding which allowed him to hire a photographer and to start work on the survey, the Cape Photographic Durchmusterung, with a six-inch f/9 Dallmeyer lens, in April 1885. The Dutch astronomer J.C. Kapteyn offered his support with analysis of the data, and this led to a lasting collaboration.

One of the colleagues with whom Gill shared his early photographs was Ernest Mouchez, who was now director of the Paris Observatory. Mouchez presented these photographs to the French Academy of Sciences in 1882, with the comment: "It required all of Mr. Gill's well-known skill and the purity of the sky over the Cape of Good Hope to obtain such a beautiful result, which now leaves no room for doubt that it will soon be possible to make excellent celestial maps by photography." He then worked with the Henry Brothers in Paris to develop suitable lenses for photographic mapping. They produced a 34 cm lens with the colour correction optimised for the wavelengths to which photgraphic plates were sensitive. Using this instrument, Mouchez obtained a photograph of 2790 stars of the 5th down to the 14th magnitude, which he presented to the Academy in 1885. On the basis of this work, Mouchez organised an International Astrophotographic Conference in Paris in April 1887, which Gill attended. The conference agreed that a photographic survey should be made to create a comprehensive catalogue of stars to the llth magnitude, and charts of the heavens approximately to the 14th magnitude. The decision was made to use refracting telescopes as developed by the Henrys, and specified approaches to the methods to be used for measurement of star positions from the photographic plates.

Gill was a strong supporter of this ambitious international venture aimed at mapping the entire sky, which became known as the Carte du Ciel. He worked with the instrument maker Howard Grubb on the spcification of the astrographic telescope to be used in the Cape contribution to the project, with assistance in smoothing bureaucratic obstacles from Wharton, now Hydrographer of the Navy. However, the Carte du Ciel caused him problems. Members of the Committee of the Royal Society thought that the Carte du Ciel and the Durchmusterung were rival projects, and that the Durchmusterung was now redundant. Gill and his supporters, including the Cambridge astronomer J.C. Adams argued that the Durchmusterung was a necessary preliminary that would provide useful information for the work on the Carte du Ciel, and also pointed to the length of time that large scale international projects would take to be set up, let alone completed. But the majority, headed by the Astronomer Royal William Christie, voted to terminate the funding for the Durchmusterung. Gill sought alternative sources of funding, including his own personal income, and was able to continue the work. It was completed in 1900, with the publication of the third volume of the catalogue, which in total listed 454,875 stars. The Carte du Ciel observations continued until 1962, and the results are still being analysed.

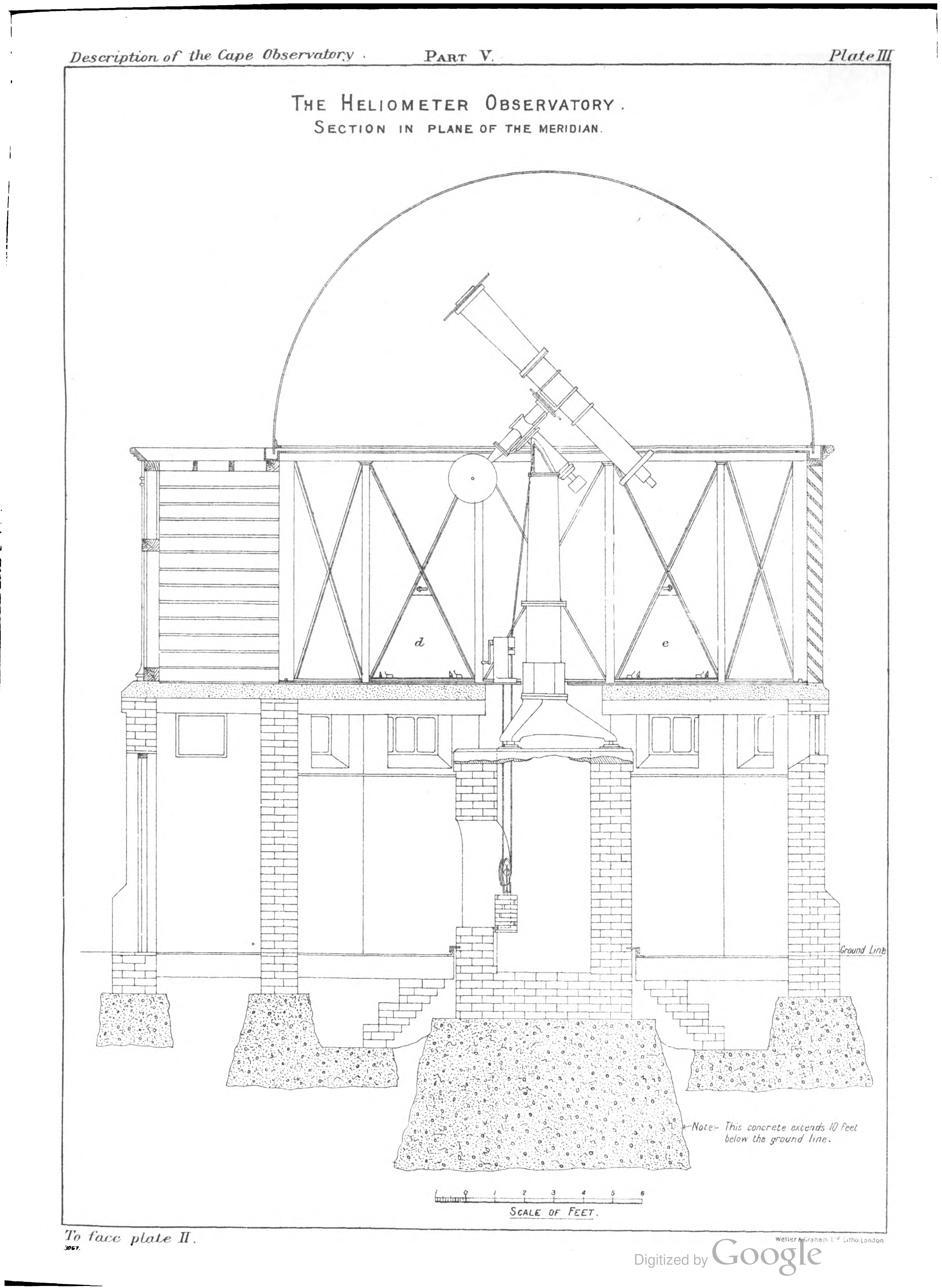
Section of the Heliometer Observatory

While Gill had carried out important work with the 4-inch heliometer, he was aware of its limitations, and applied for funding for a larger instrument. This was approved in 1884, and the 7-inch heliometer, made by Repsold in Hamburg, was delivered in 1887, in time for Gill to take it back with him on his return to the Cape. He started a programme of determination of stellar parallaxes which examined 17 stars and continued until 1899. The results showed that some of the brightest stars in the sky, such as Canopus and Rigel, are distant from us, and therefore intensely luminous. During this period he also continued his work on solar parallax. His observations on Ascension Island had taken advantage of the close opposition of the planet Mars. However, Gill believed that the minor planets (or asteroids), although further away, were generally better targets, as they appeared as points of light rather than disks at the required magnification, and this made for more accurate measurement with the heliometer. This work was a collaboration between observers at widely separated locations, with heliometer measures of Iris Victoria and Sappho made mainly by Gill and William Finlay at the Cape, by Elkin and Hall at Yale, and by Peter at Leipzig. Other collaborators including Arthur Auwers made measurements of locations of comparison stars, Auwers travelling from Berliin to the Cape to assist. The work gave an improved value of solar parallax which became the internationally accepted value. In his work on the minor planets, Gill detected a periodic anomaly. He was able to show that this was due to the perturbing effect of the moon. The accepted value of the mass of the moon had been included in the calculations, but the remaining perturbation indicated that this acccepted value was incorrect. Gill was able to correct this error. Another project with the Cape heliometer was a determination of the mass of Jupiter, using observations on the satellites. Previous studies had used eclipses or measured the distances from satellites to the edge of the planet, but Gill preferred to measure distances between the four satellites as they orbitted Jupiter, arguing, as with the minor planets, that the position of a point of light could be determined more accurately than the edge of a disc. Observations were made in 1891, but because of pressure of other work remained unanalysed. In August 1897 Willem de Sitter, then a student, who Gill had met the previous year in Kapteyn's office in Groningen, arrived at the Cape for a two year period as assistant. In 1898 Gill suggested that he should take on reduction and analysis of the Jupiter data as a doctoral project, which he did, successfully presenting his dissertation in 1901.

Between 1894 and 1905, two large telescopes were installed in the Observatory. The first, which became known as the Victoria telescope, was the gift of Frank McClean, a pioneer in spectroscopy and a friend of Gill's. This was a 24-inch refractor, designed for astrophotography and spectrography. The offer was formally made and accepted in 1894, and the telescope and its observatory buildings were completed in 1901.. The second was a reversible transit circle. Soon after Gill's arrival at the Cape, he pointed out the deficiencies of the existing instrument, but a replacement was not approved until 1897, again with the support of Wharton. Gill took a major role in the design of the instrument, the most important feature being the ability to reverse it on its bearings in order to eliminate certain systematic errors. Considerable attention was given to rigidity of construction, and to reducing the effects of temperature changes as much as possible. The instrument was brought into regular use in 1905, and observations continued until 1974.

In 1905 the annual meeting of the British Association was held in South Africa. The idea of the meeting had been suggested by Gill in 1900 when he was in London to receive his K.C.B.. Gill was much involved in the organisation of the meeting, which was more elaborate than the usual British Association meetings, held in a single city in the U.K.. Sessions were held in both Cape Town and Johannesburg, and excursions were organised to five additional cities as well as to Rhodesia and Mozambique. 380 British delegates attended, assisted by a £6000 grant to subsidize steamer fares and travel within Southern Africa. There were also a number of foreign delegates, including two anthropologists. According to his biographer George Forbes, Gill tried to do too much himself, and the overwork led to a breakdown in his health, which contributed to his decision to retire the following year. He also had a personal loss with the death of William Wharton, who attended the meeting as President of the Geographical Section, and was staying as a guest of the Gills. He developed enteric fever, and died at the Cape Observatory.

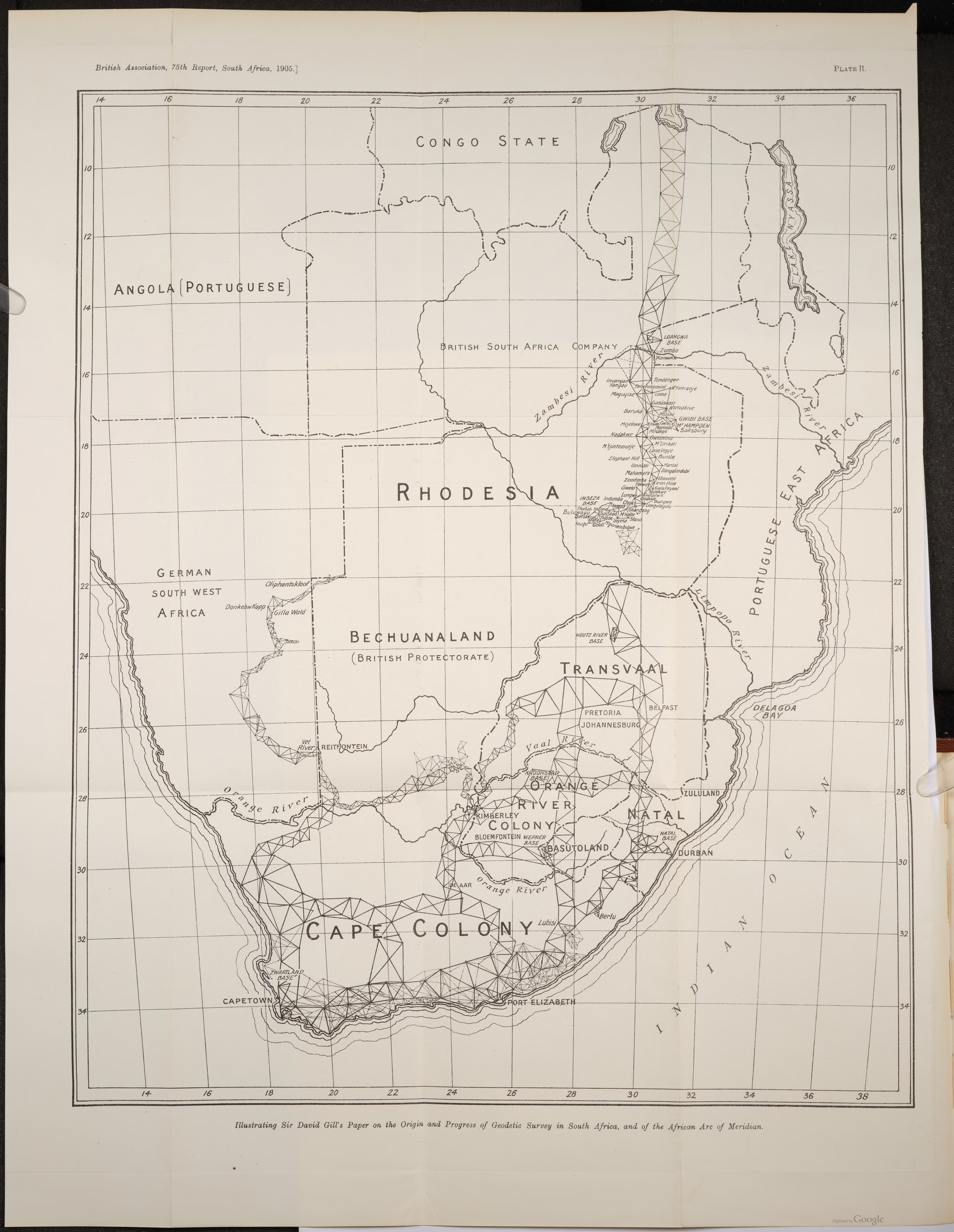
Map of the Geodetic Survey of Southern Africa showing progress to 1905.

Gill was extensively involved in geodetic survey work. Early in his time at the Cape, he approached Sir Bartle Frere, governor of South Africa on this matter. Funds were raised, and a group of Royal Engineers carried out a survey of both Cape Colony and Natal between 1883 and 1892. Gill then worked on analysis of the data incorporating earlier triangulation work, which was completed in 1901. Gill wished to extend this work to establish an arc of meridian, a chain of triangulations which would extend along the 30th meridian of east longitude from South Africa to the mouth of the Nile. He foresaw that this could then be extended to connect with existing surveys to the Struve Geodetic Arc, forming a single chain extening 105º to the North Cape, the longest arc of meridian in the world. Wit the support of Cecil Rhodes work was carried out in Rhodesia, starting in 1897. Gill presented a detailed account of the survey work at the British Association in 1905. By 1907 he was able to report that the chain was complete from Cape Agulhas, the southernmost point of the African mainland, to within 50 miles of the southern shore of Lake Tanganyika The chain was completed to connect with the Struve arc, as Gill had foreseen, but not until 1954.

== Retirement and death ==
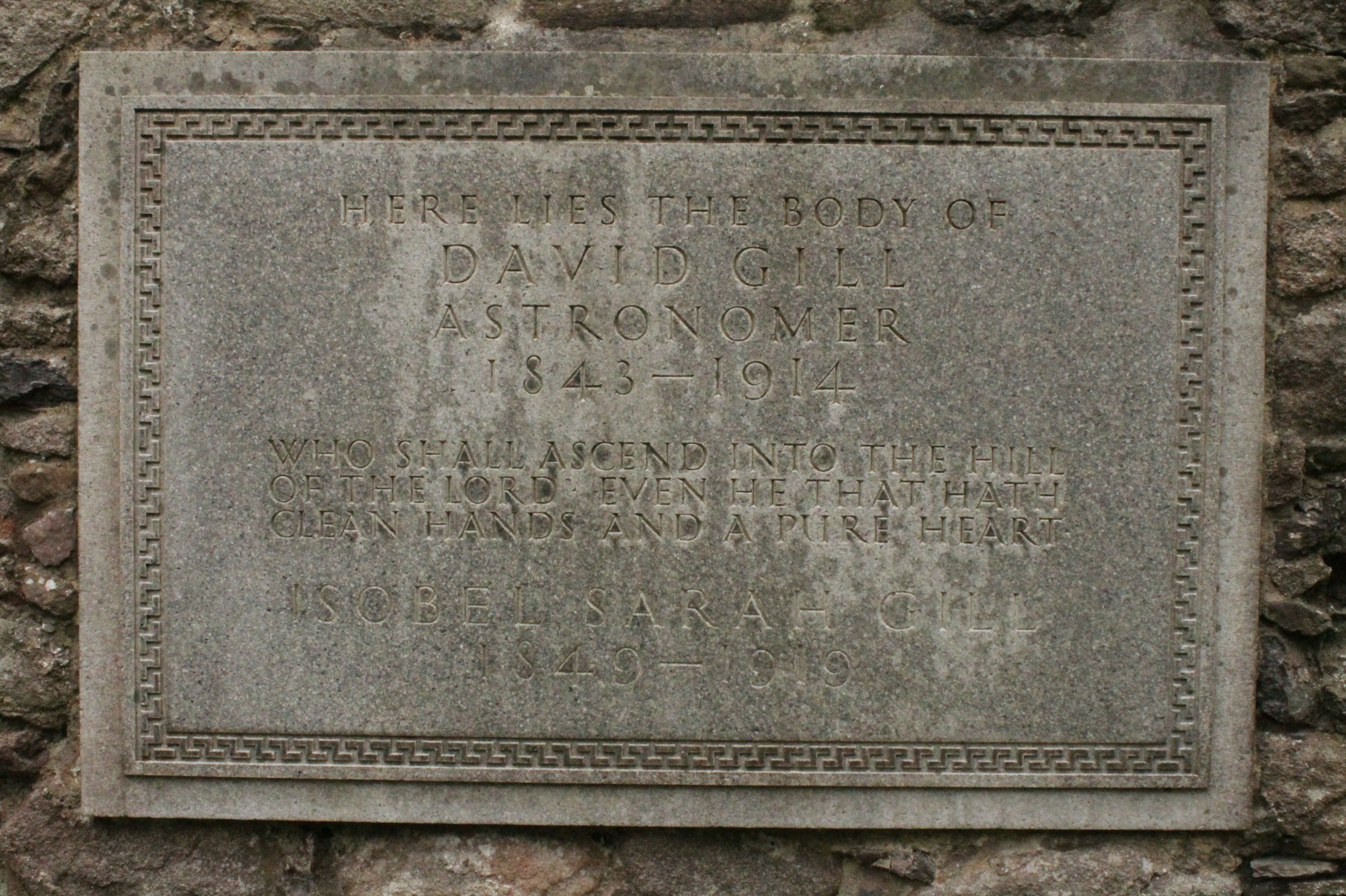
The grave of David and Isobel Gill, St. Machar's Cathedral, Aberdeen.

On Gill's retirement in 1906, the couple moved to London, where Gill served for two years (1909–1911) as president of the Royal Astronomical Society. His concern with measurement led to him becoming a member of the International Committee for Weights and Measures (CIPM) from 1907-1914. As president of the British Association, he gave a presidential address in 1907 in which he advocated definitions based on fundamental physical properties, rather than on arbitrary standards such as a rod of metal with lines ruled upon it, to determine the yard or metre.

Gill died in 1914. He is buried next to his wife, Isobel Sarah Gill, who died in 1919, on the grounds of St. Machar's Cathedral, Aberdeen. Their grave lies on the east outer wall of the church.

== Bibliography ==
=== Selected writings ===
His writings include:

- Gill, David (1877). "The determination of the solar parallax". The Observatory. 1: In six parts, pp. 7–13, 38–44, 74–82, 101–106, 129–134, 273–280. Bibcode:1877Obs.....1....7G.
- Gill, David (1881). "Account of a Determination of the Solar Parallax from Observations of Mars, made at Ascension in 1877". Memoirs of the Royal Astronomical Society. 46: 1–172. Bibcode:1881MmRAS..46....1G.
- Gill, David; Elkin, William Lewis (1884). "Heliometer-determinations of Stellar Parallax in the Southern Hemisphere". Memoirs of the Royal Astronomical Society. 48: 1–194.
- Gill, David (1893). Heliometer observations for determination of stellar parallax made at the Royal Observatory, Cape of Good Hope. London: Eyre and Spottiswoode.
- Gill, David; Auwers, Arthur; Elkin, William Lewis (1897). "A Determination of the Solar Parallax and Mass of the Moon from Heliometer Observations of Victoria and Sappho". Annals of the Cape Observatory. 6: i-5.32. Bibcode:1897AnCap...6A...1G.
- Gill, David; Kapteyn, J.C. (1897–1900). "The Cape Photographic Durchmusterung: for the Equinox 1875". Annals of the Cape Observatory. Part 1 (Volume 3); Part 2 (Volume 4); Part 3 (Volume 5)
- Gill, David (1913). A History and Description of the Royal Observatory, Cape of Good Hope. London: H.M. Stationery Office.

=== Dun Echt Observatory publications ===
- Volume 1 Summary of Struve Double Stars. Aberdeen: Dun Echt. 1876.
- Volume 2 Mauritius Expedition Solar Parallax. Aberdeen: Dun Echt. 1877.
- Volume 3 Mauritius Expedition Longitude and Latitude. Aberdeen: Dun Echt. 1885.

=== Annals of the Cape Observatory ===
- Volume 1 (in five parts), 1898
- Volume 2: Part 1 Comet of 1882; Part 2 Catalogue of Double Stars, 1899; Parts 3 and 4, 1901, 1905.
- Volume 3: Cape Photographic Durchmusterung Part 1, 1896
- Volume 4: Cape Photographic Durchmusterung Part 2, 1897.
- Volume 5: Cape Photographic Durchmusterung Part 2, 1900.
- Volume 6: Solar parallax and mass of the moon, 1897.
- Voume 7: Solar parallax and mass of the moon (continued), 1896
- Volume 8 (in eight parts), 1909.
- Volume 9: Cape Photographic Durchmusterung, Revision, 1903.

== Honours ==
- Elected Fellow of the Royal Society, 7 June 1883
- Companion of the Order of the Bath, 20 May 1896
- Elected International Member of the United States National Academy of Sciences, 1898
- Knight Commander of the Order of the Bath, 24 May 1900
- President, Royal Astronomical Society, 1909–1911
- Member of the Royal Swedish Academy of Sciences, 1910
- Elected International Member of the American Philosophical Society, 1910
- Elected International Honorary Member of the American Academy of Arts and Sciences

=== Lectures ===
In 1909 he was invited to deliver the Royal Institution Christmas Lecture on Astronomy, Old and New.

=== Awards ===
- Valz Prize (1879)
- Bruce Medal (1900)
- Gold Medal of the Royal Astronomical Society (1882 and 1908)
- James Craig Watson Medal (1899)

=== Named after him ===
- Gill (lunar crater)
- Gill (Martian crater)
