= Theodore Marshall =

Scottish minister

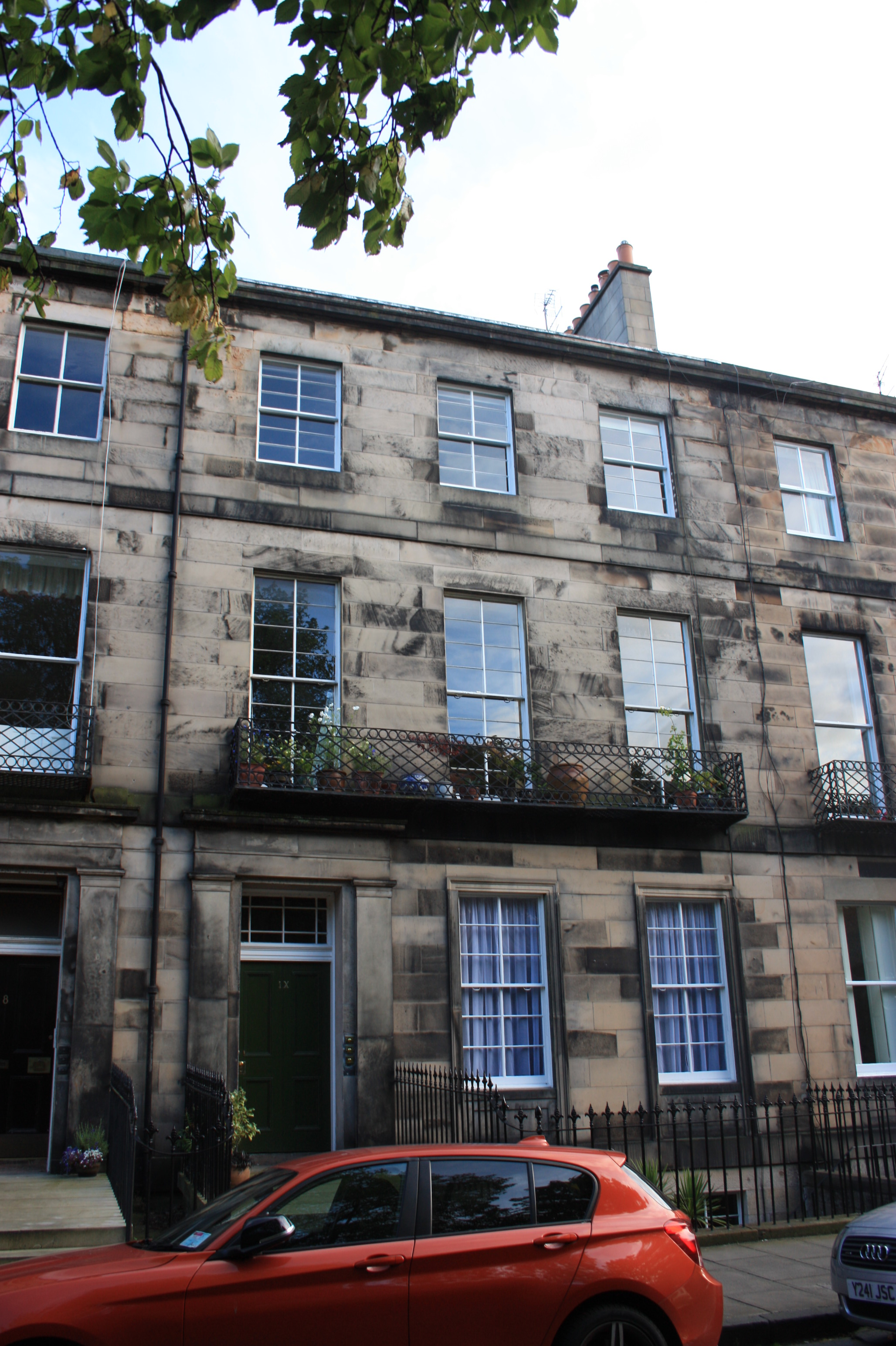
9 Fettes Row, Edinburgh

Theodore Marshall (1846–1909) was a Scottish minister who served as Moderator of the General Assembly of the Church of Scotland in 1908.

== Life ==
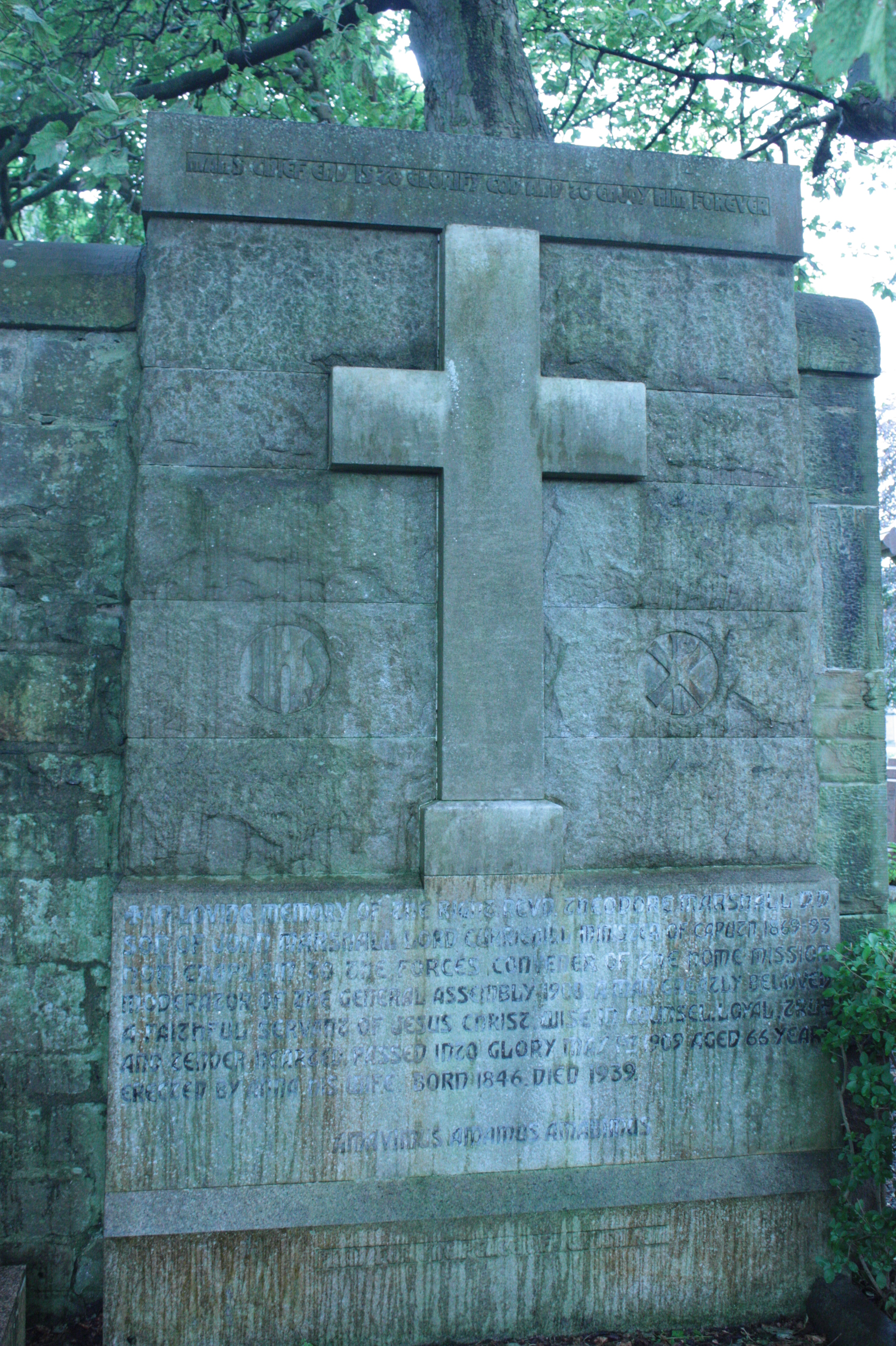
The grave of Rev Theodore Marshall, Dean Cemetery, Edinburgh

Marshall was born on 8 March 1843 at 9 Fettes Row the son of Margaret Tod Bell daughter of Rev Andrew Bell of Crail and John Marshall, advocate (later known as Lord Curriehill). He was educated at Loretto School and Edinburgh Academy, then studied at the University of Glasgow and the University of Edinburgh, graduating with an MA in 1864.

He was licensed to preach by the Presbytery of Wigtown in 1867 and served as assistant at St Stephen's Church in Stockbridge, Edinburgh. He was ordained as minister of Caputh in Perthshire in February 1869 under the patronage of Queen Victoria and remained there until 1893.

He then followed in the footsteps of Very Rev K. M. Phin and ran the Church of Scotland's Home Mission Service based at 22 Queen Street in Edinburgh's New Town. He lived at Linkswood, Davidsons Mains in western Edinburgh.

On 1 May 1909, he died while travelling on a train from Perth to Crieff. Because he died during his tenancy as Moderator he remained styled as Right Reverend (Very Reverend being the style for former Moderators).

He is buried in Dean Cemetery in western Edinburgh. The grave lies on the north side of the central gap between the original cemetery and the first northern extension. His grave wrongly terms him Very Reverend. He is also memorialised on his parents' grave in St Cuthberts Churchyard in the city centre, where he is correctly titled Right Rev.

== Family ==
He married Anne Nicholson (1846–1939) at 3 Regent Terrace, Edinburgh on 21 July 1869. She was the daughter of Rev Dr Maxwell Nicholson of St Stephen's Church in Stockbridge, Edinburgh.

== Memorials ==
The baptismal font at Iona Abbey is dedicated to his memory.
