= John Marshall, Lord Curriehill =

Scottish judge

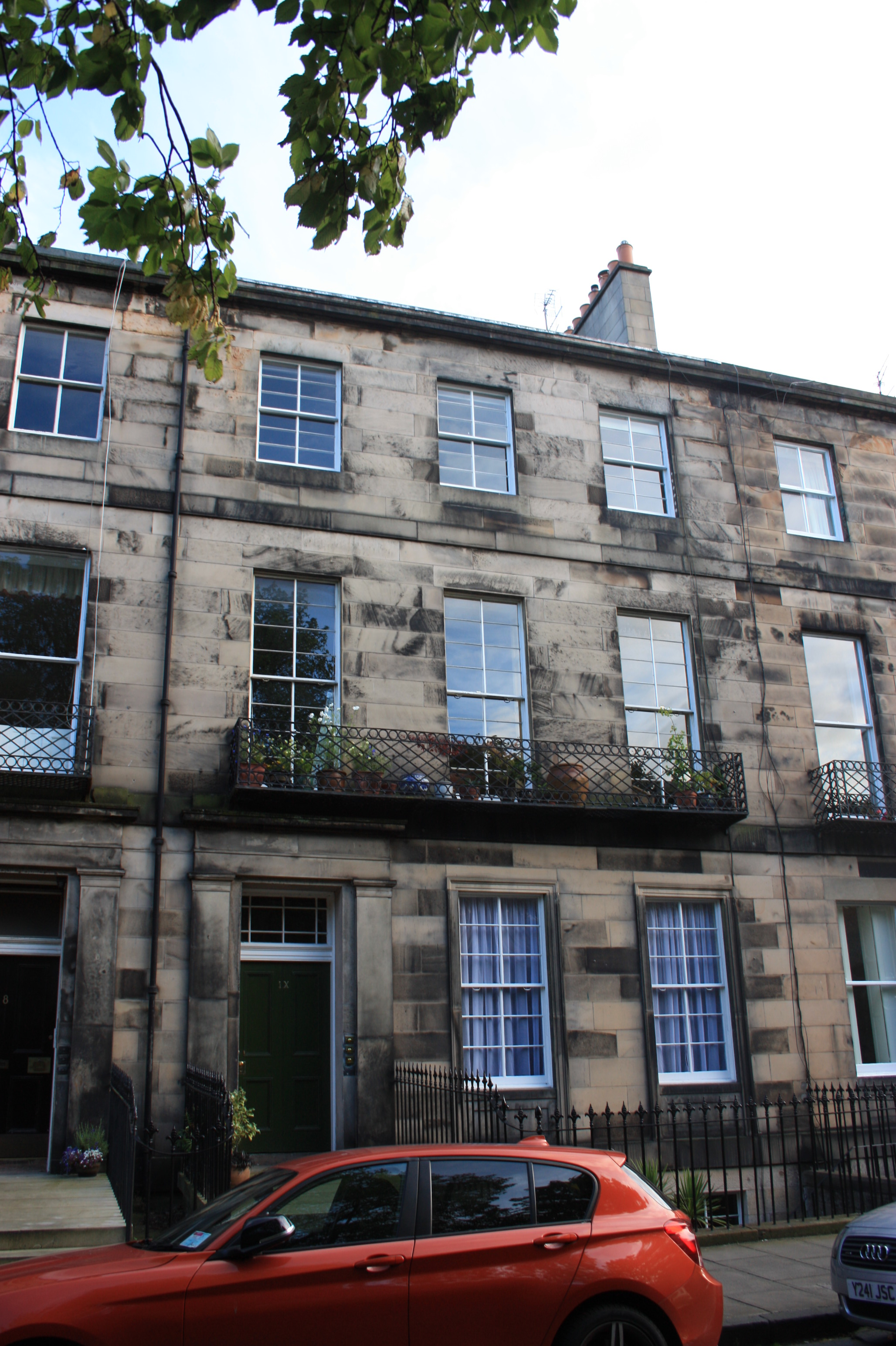
9 Fettes Row, Edinburgh

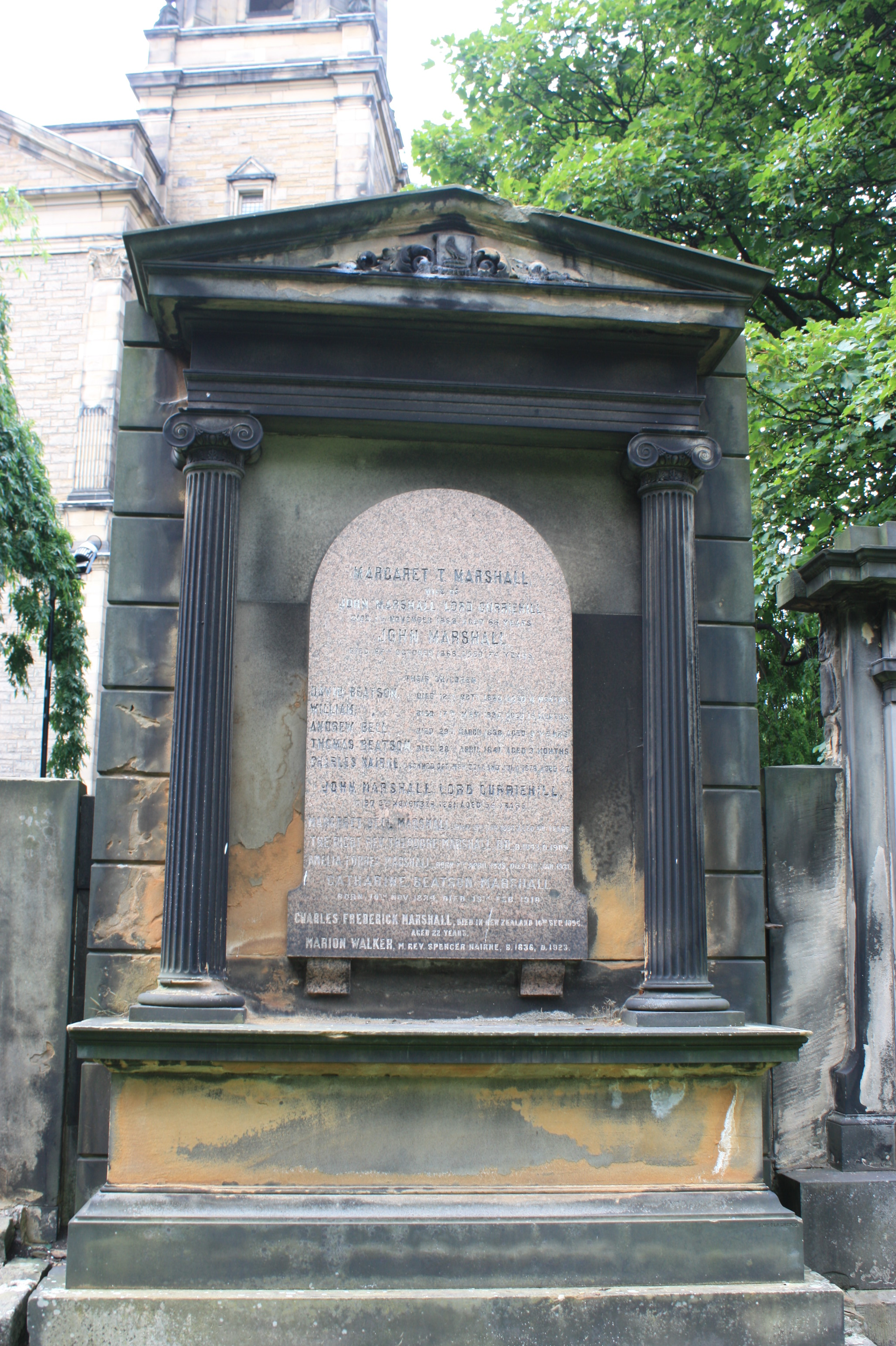
The grave of John Marshall, Lord Curriehill, St Cuthberts churchyard, Edinburgh

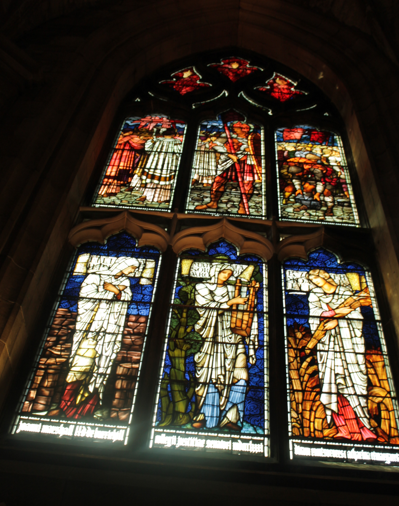
Memorial window to John Marshall of Curriehill, St Giles Cathedral

John Marshall, Lord Curriehill (1794–1868) was a Scottish judge and a Senator of the College of Justice.

== Life ==
Marshall was born in Wigtownshire on 7 January 1794, the son of Marion, daughter of Henry Walker and John Marshall of Garlieston, Wigtownshire. His family moved to Edinburgh around 1805 where his father worked as a lawyer. They lived at 40 South Hanover Street, a newly built property in Edinburgh's New Town He studied law at the University of Edinburgh from around 1809.

In November 1818 Marshall was called to the Scottish bar, and was made an advocate and he then built up an extensive practice, operating from 17 George Street near his family home. He purchased the estate of Curriehill, south of Edinburgh, in Midlothian around 1840. In March 1852 he was elected Dean of the Faculty of Advocates, and on 3 November in the same year a judge of the Court of Session, with the title of "Lord Curriehill".

His interlocutor in the Yelverton case was an example of his literary style. In 1846 he was living at 9 Fettes Row with his growing family.

In October 1868 Marshall retired from office, and on 27 October a few days after retiring, died at his country house, Curriehill, in Currie south-west of Edinburgh.

He is buried with his wife Margaret in St Cuthbert's churchyard in central Edinburgh. The grave lies against the north wall of the central section, south of the church.

== Family ==
In 1826 Marshall married Margaret Bell, daughter of the Rev. Andrew Bell of Kilcunean, minister of Crail, Fife; she died in November 1866. Their son, John Marshall, a barrister in 1851, became a judge of the court of session, also with the title of Lord Curriehill, on 29 October 1874, and died on 5 November 1881, aged 54. Their son Theodore became Moderator of the General Assembly of the Church of Scotland in 1908.

== Recognition ==
A large stained glass window was added in St Giles Cathedral in Edinburgh dedicated to Lord Curriehill in the late 19th century. The window is in the north-west section of the cathedral.
