= David Thomson (physicist) =

Prof David Thomson (1817–1880) was a 19th-century Scottish physicist. He was known as Davie Thomson or later Auld Dauvit.

== Life ==
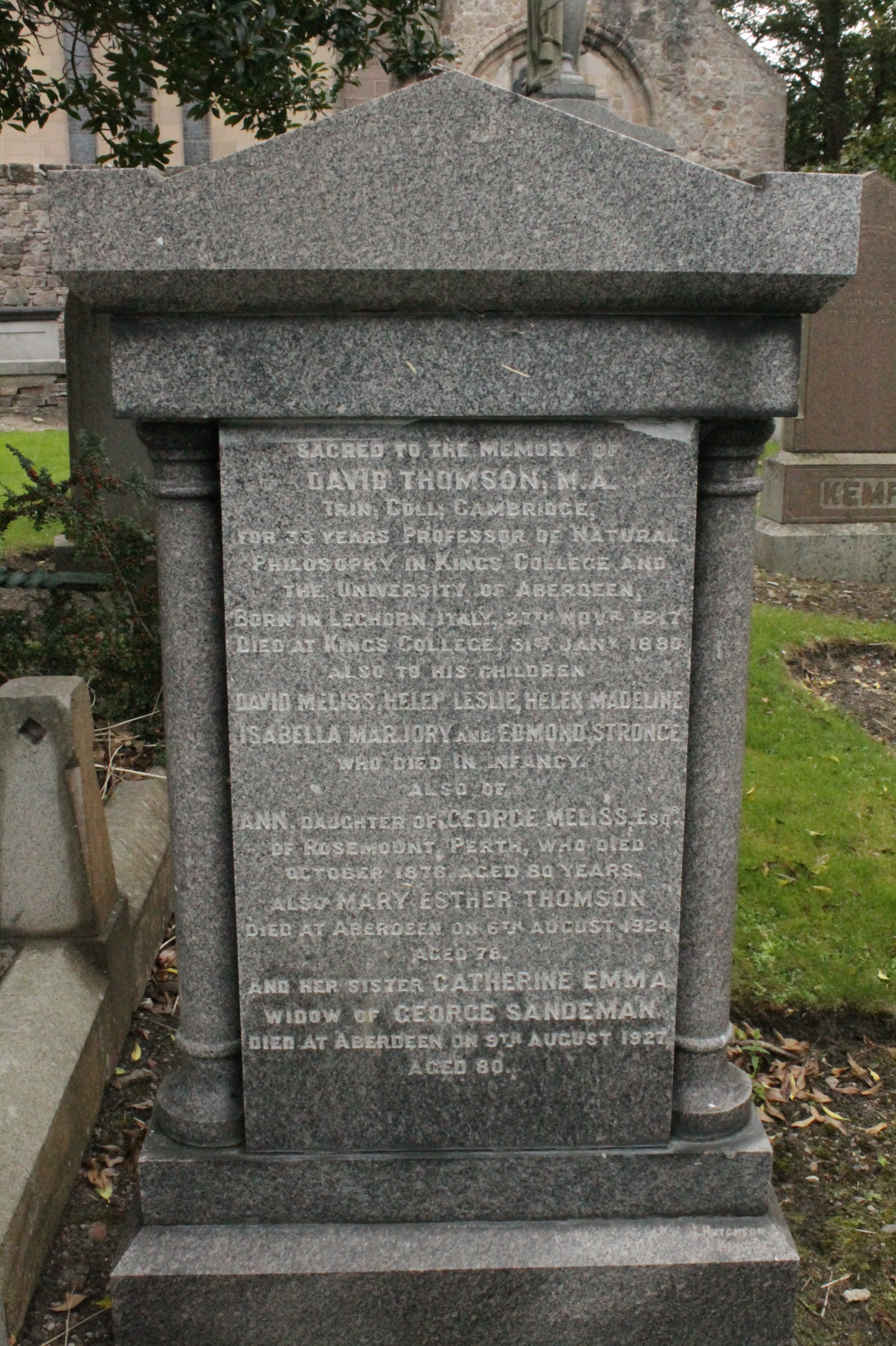
The grave of Prof David Thomson, churchyard of St Machar's Cathedral

He was born on 27 November 1817 the son of David Thomson a merchant in Leghorn in Italy. He was educated in Italy and Switzerland then sent to Glasgow University in 1832. In 1836 he won a place at Trinity College, Cambridge where he gained a BA in 1839 (and was granted MA in 1845).

From 1840 he acted as substitute Professor of Natural Philosophy (Physics) in place of William Meikleham at Glasgow University. His most notable student was William Thomson, Lord Kelvin. In 1845 he got a permanent position at King's College, Aberdeen. In 1854 he became Sub-Principal of the college. When King's and Marischal College merged in 1860 to create the University of Aberdeen he was kept on as Professor (in preference to the younger James Clerk Maxwell, professor of natural philosophy at Marischal College) but was no longer Sub-Principal. His students included George Slessor and George Pirie.

In 1863 he and a very young David Gill (then a young student) restored the university clock and also set up a fine telescope in the Cromwell Tower Observatory. It was Thomson who introduced Gill to astronomy.

He died in his lodgings at Kings College on 31 January 1880. He is buried in the churchyard of St Machar's Cathedral. The grave lies east of the church.

== Publications ==
- Acoustics - article in 9th edition of Encyclopedia Britannica.
- Caledonia Romana (1852)

== Artistic recognition ==
A marble bust of Thomson by John Hutchison RSA is held by Aberdeen University.

== Family ==
He was outlived by his wife, one son and three daughters.

At least five of his children died in infancy.
