= Peter Colin Campbell =

Scottish clergyman (1810–1876)

The Very Reverend Peter Colin Campbell

1st Principal of the University of Aberdeen
- In office 1865–1876
- Succeeded by: Reverend William Robinson Piriel

Personal details
- Born: 21 January 1810 Ardchattan, Argyleshire, Scotland
- Died: 12 December 1876 (aged 66) Aberdeen, Aberdeenshire, Scotland
- Spouse: Jessie Wylie (m. 1838)
- Children: 12
- Education: University of Edinburgh
- Profession: Clergyman, Professor and Principal

Peter Colin Campbell (1810–1876) was a Scottish clergyman in the Church of Scotland who became the first professor at Queen's University, Canada and was later the first Principal of the University of Aberdeen, a role he held for 21 years.

== Life ==
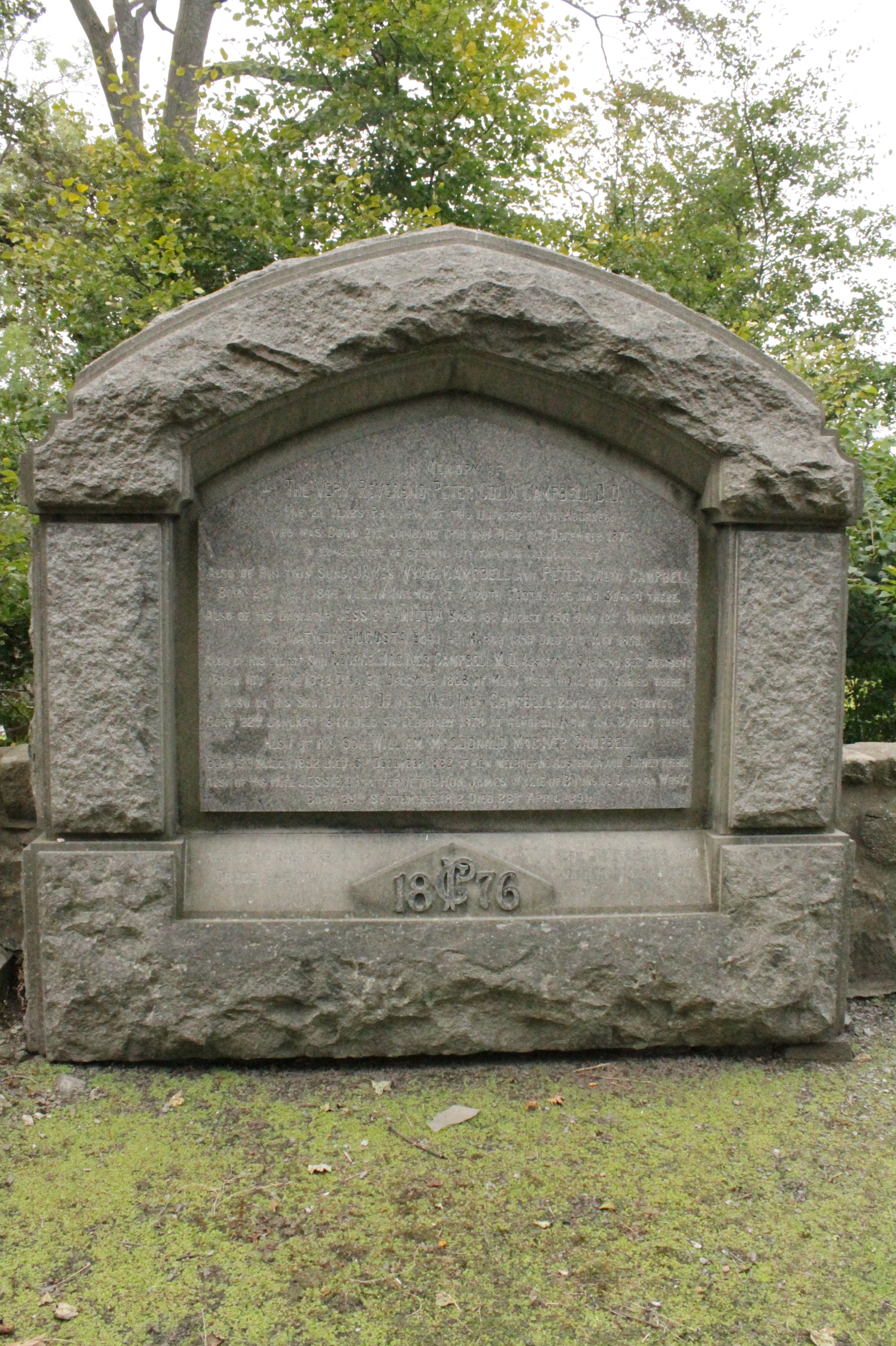
The grave of the Very Rev Peter Colin Campbell, St Machar's Cathedral churchyard

He was born on 21 January 1810 in the manse of Ardchattan in Argyleshire, the son of Rev George Campbell, the parish minister. He was educated at the University of Edinburgh, graduating with an MA in 1829.

In 1835 he was licensed to preach as a Church of Scotland minister by the Presbytery of Inverary, and sent to Canada as minister of St John's Presbyterian Church in Brockville. He was one of the 26 co-founders of Queen's University. In 1840 he was officially appointed as its first professor, in the role of Professor of Classics (Latin and Greek) at Queen's University, but not until 1842 did he begin lecturing (alongside Thomas Liddell as Principal).

He left Queen's in 1844 and returned to Scotland, where he got an appointment as the parish minister of the small Perthshire village of Caputh in September 1845. He remained in this role until December 1854, when he took the prestigious position as Professor of Greek at the University of Aberdeen, later rising to be Principal of the University.

He lived at 32 College Bounds in Old Aberdeen.

He died on 12 December 1876 and is buried in Old Machar Churchyard in Old Aberdeen.

== Family ==
In January 1838 he married Jessie Wylie (1812-1892) daughter of the Hon. James Wylie of Burnside in West Canada. They had six daughters and six sons.

Academic offices
Preceded by Position created	Principal and Vice-Chancellor of the University of Aberdeen; 1865—1876	Succeeded by Reverend William Robinson Piriel
