= Lewis William Forbes =

Scottish minister

- Born: 1794; Banff, Aberdeenshire, Scotland
- Died: 1854 (aged 59–60); Banff, Aberdeenshire, Scotland
- Burial place: Boharm Churchyard
- Occupation: minister

Lewis William Forbes (1794–1854) was a Scottish minister who served as Moderator of the General Assembly of the Church of Scotland in 1852, the highest position in the Church of Scotland

== Life ==
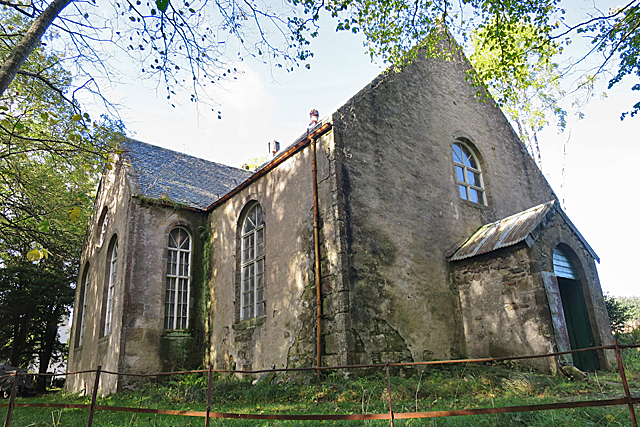
Boharm Church

He was born in Banff, Aberdeenshire on 16 August 1794.

He was minister of Boharm, a small parish south of Fochabers in rural Banffshire, for 37 years.

He died at the Church on 8 January 1854. He is buried in Boharm Churchyard.

== Family ==
He was married twice. His first wife was Penelope Cowie. His son, Archibald Forbes, was a famous war correspondent. His daughter Margaret Chalmers Forbes (1821–1903) married the Very Rev William Robinson Pirie, Moderator in 1864. They had eight children. She is buried in Old Machar Churchyard in Aberdeen. His second son, George Cowie Forbes, trained as a doctor and emigrated to the United States, dying in San Francisco in December 1850. His second wife, Elizabeth Mary Forbes, died in 1892 and is buried in Allenvale Cemetery in Aberdeen.
