= Caputh, Perth and Kinross =

Parish and village in Scotland

Coordinates: 56.543115°N 3.484786°W

Caputh: Scottish Gaelic: a' Cheapaich
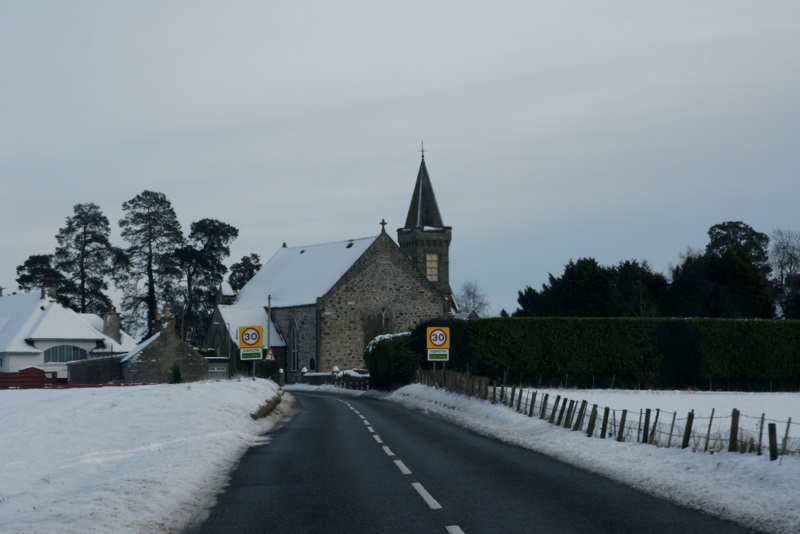
- Looking east along the A984 to Caputh and Clunic Parish Church

- Location within Perth and Kinross
- OS grid reference: NO088400
- Council area: Perth and Kinross
- Lieutenancy area: Perth and Kinross
- Country: Scotland
- Sovereign state: United Kingdom
- Post town: BLAIRGOWRIE
- Postcode district: PH13
- Dialling code: 01828
- Police: Scotland
- Fire: Scottish
- Ambulance: Scottish
- UK Parliament: Angus and Perthshire Glens
- Scottish Parliament: Perth Mid Scotland and Fife

Caputh (/ˈkeɪpəθ/ KAY-pəth) is a parish and village in Perth and Kinross, Scotland. It lies on the A984 Coupar Angus-to-Dunkeld road, about 6 miles (10 kilometres) southeast of Dunkeld and 8 miles (13 kilometres) west of Coupar Angus.

It stands on the banks of the River Tay.

The parish includes the East Cult standing stones.

A 120m wide cairn, known as Cairnmore, was removed to facilitate farming in the 19th century. Remains of an important Roman fort still exist nearby at Inchtuthill. Cleaven Dyke is near Meikleour, in the same parish, and was long-thought to be Roman too, but is now regarded as being a substantial Neolithic cursus.

Dunkeld was partly in Caputh parish until 1891.

== Education ==
The village has a primary school, Glendelvine Primary School, built in 1876.

== Notable people ==
Revd. Peter Colin Campbell was parish minister 1845 to 1854, before going to Aberdeen University, where he served as principal.

From 1869 to 1893 Revd. Theodore Marshall was minister of Caputh. In 1908 he was elected Moderator of the General Assembly of the Church of Scotland. He died during his year in office.

Belle Stewart, an influential twentieth-century traditional singer, was "born in a bow tent on the banks of the River Tay on 18 July 1906 in... Caputh".
