= Alexander de Kininmund (bishop, died 1380) =

Scottish cleric

- Bishop of Aberdeen
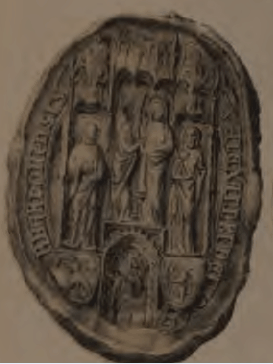
- Church: Roman Catholic Church
- See: Diocese of Aberdeen
- In office: 1355–1380
- Predecessor: John de Rate
- Successor: Adam de Tyninghame
- Previous post: Archdeacon of Aberdeen

Orders
- Consecration: 1356

Personal details
- Born: Early-Mid 14th century Scotland.
- Died: 1380 Scone

Alexander de Kininmund was a 14th-century Scottish cleric. In his youth he went to a university and achieved a Licentiate in the Arts (although it is not known which university this was).

== Career ==
He was made Dean of Brechin Cathedral in 1350, leaving this post in 1352 to become Archdeacon of Aberdeen. It was the later position that enabled him, after the death of Bishop John de Rate in either late 1354 or early 1355, to be elected as the new Bishop of Aberdeen.

Upon receiving the request for confirmation by the new bishop and the chapter of Aberdeen, the Pope declared that he had previously reserved the see for his own choice and declared the election void. The Pope nevertheless supported the decision of the chapter and appointed Alexander as bishop on 4 December 1355. He was consecrated before 12 July 1356; according to Hector Boece, this took place at Perth in the presence of the king. Boece also wrote that King David II of Scotland had written to the chapter of Aberdeen requesting that they elect a French follower of his by the name of Nicholas, but that the chapter refused to accommodate this suggestion.

== Politician ==
Alexander was one of several bishop-proctors appointed for the ransom of King David in 1357, after the latter had been taken as a hostage by the English crown at the Battle of Neville's Cross eleven years earlier. He was, therefore, a royal diplomat on the king's business and afforded a degree of royal trust. In 1362, King David granted the bishopric some land in the County of Banff to augment the income of a canon who in return would say mass for the souls of King David and his ancestors, perhaps as a reward for his service. Bishop Alexander died on 29 July 1380, and was buried before the altar of Aberdeen Cathedral. According to Hector Boece, he was at Scone when he died.

== Notes ==
Religious titles
Preceded by John de Rait	Archdeacon of Aberdeen x 1352–1355	Succeeded by John Barbour
Preceded by John de Rait	Bishop of Aberdeen; 1355–1380	Succeeded by Adam de Tyninghame
