= Treaty of Vincennes-Edinburgh =

1371 treaty between Scotland and France

The Treaty of Vincennes-Edinburgh (1371) renewed the Auld Alliance between Scotland and France, forty-five years after the Treaty of Corbeil (1326). It confirmed the obligation of each state to join the other in declaring war if either was attacked by England. The deputation from Scotland set out three days following the coronation of Robert II of Scotland and was led by Walter Wardlaw, Bishop of Glasgow, Archibald the Grim, Lord of Galloway, and Adam de Tyninghame, Deacon (later Bishop) of Aberdeen. Charles V of France signed the treaty at the Château de Vincennes on 30 June, and it was confirmed at Edinburgh Castle on 28 October.

== See also ==
- List of treaties
