= Thomas Stewart (bishop of St Andrews) =

Arms of Thomas Stewart, Archdeacon of St. Andrews

Thomas Stewart was an illegitimate son of King Robert II of Scotland. In 1380, Antipope Clement VII provided Thomas with the Archdeaconry of the Bishopric of St. Andrews, as well as the canonry (and prebend) of Stobo in the Bishopric of Glasgow. In 1389, the king petitioned and obtained for Thomas from the Pope the right to hold the deanery of the Bishopric of Dunkeld along with his other offices, and in 1393, the Pope provided a canonry in the Bishopric of Brechin. In this period, Archdeacon Thomas obtained a Bachelor of Canon Law at the University of Paris.

On 1 July 1401, following the death of Walter Trail, Bishop of St. Andrews, Thomas was elected to fill the see's vacancy. However, because of the problems experienced by Avignon Pope Benedict XIII, who was being besieged by the King of France, Thomas had problems obtaining Papal confirmation. In this context, Thomas' election fell victim to the political struggles of the time. Thomas was supported by his nephew, David Stewart, Duke of Rothesay, who actively campaigned in the region of St. Andrews during the year 1401. However, this aligned him against his half-brother, Robert Stewart, 1st Duke of Albany. In order to obtain control of Dumbarton Castle, the Duke of Albany offered its keeper, Walter de Danyelston, the semi-vacant see of St. Andrews. After a meeting between Albany and the Bishop elect at Abernethy in the summer of 1402, Thomas renounced his rights as Bishop and allowed a new "election" to take place.

Religious titles
Preceded by Walter Trail	Bishop of St. Andrews (Cill Rìmhinn); 1401–2 elect only	Succeeded by Walter de Danyelston and Gilbert Greenlaw (unconsecrated); Henry Wardlaw (consecrated)
