= Treaty of Corbeil =

The Treaty of Corbeil may refer to:

- The Treaty of Corbeil (1258) between France and Aragon
- The Treaty of Corbeil (1326) between France and Scotland
