= Walter de Danielston =

Scottish religious figure

Walter de Danielston [Danyelston] (died 1402) was an early 15th-century bishop-elect of St. Andrews. Walter first appears on record in 1392 as a licentiate canon of the Bishopric of Aberdeen, studying civil law at Avignon. By 1394, Donnchadh, Earl of Lennox had presented him with control of the hospice of the poor at a place called "Poknade". By the beginning of the 15th century Walter's involvement in Lennox facilitated his role as the castellan of Dumbarton. In either 1397 or 1398, Walter seized the castle after the death of his brother Robert. It was the latter position that opened up the bishopric for him. He was postulated as Bishop of St. Andrews in 1402 at the insistence of Robert Stewart, 1st Duke of Albany, who had promised him the position in return for handing over the castle. After a meeting between Albany and Thomas Stewart, the contemporary bishop-elect in the summer of 1402, Thomas renounced his rights as bishop and allowed a new "election" to take place. Walter was thereby elected as bishop. However, the election came to nothing, as Walter died without confirmation that very same Christmas.

Religious titles
Preceded by Walter Trail (consecrated); Thomas Stewart (unconsecrated)	Bishop of St Andrews (Cill Rìmhinn); 1402 elect only	Succeeded by Gilbert Greenlaw (unconsecrated); Henry Wardlaw (consecrated)
