= Henry de Lichton =

Medieval Scottish prelate and diplomat

- Bishop of Aberdeen
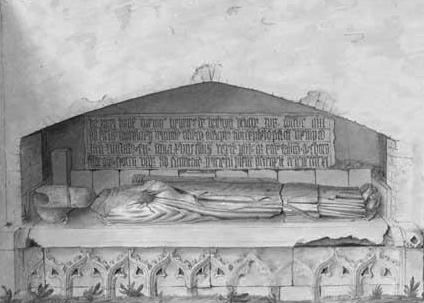
- Church: Roman Catholic Church
- See: Diocese of Aberdeen
- In office: 1422–1440
- Predecessor: Gilbert de Greenlaw
- Successor: Ingram Lindsay
- Previous posts: Moray (1414–1422); Archdeacon of Aberdeen

Orders
- Consecration: 8 March 1415, at Valencia (for Moray)

Personal details
- Born: 1369 x 1379 Angus
- Died: 12 December 1440 – 14 December 1440 Probably Aberdeen

Henry de Lichton [de Lychtone, Leighton] (died 1440) was a medieval Scottish prelate and diplomat, who, serving as Bishop of Moray (1414–1422) and Bishop of Aberdeen (1422–1440), became a significant patron of the church, a cathedral builder, and a writer. He also served King James I of Scotland as a diplomat in England, France, and Italy.

== Early church career ==
Lichton was born in the diocese of Brechin (probably Angus) somewhere between 1369 and 1379 to Henry and Janet Lichton. He was well-educated for his time, attending the University of Orléans and possibly the University of St Andrews, earning licentiates in civil law and canon law, a bachelorate in canon law, and a doctorate in canon law, all achieved between 1394 and 1415; he attained an additional doctorate—in civil law—by 1436. Lichton followed an ecclesiastical career simultaneously with his studies. The first notice of this career comes in 1392, when he was vicar of Markinch in Fife, a vicariate of St Andrews Cathedral Priory. He was a canon of the diocese of Moray by 1394, and Archdeacon of Aberdeen by 1395, holding this position into the following year, 1396.

== Bishop of Moray ==
After the death of Bishop John de Innes in 1414, the chapter of Elgin Cathedral met to elect a new bishop, and on 18 May Lichton was elected Bishop of Moray. Lichton travelled to Continental Europe to receive consecration, and was consecrated on 8 March 1415, at Valencia by Pope Benedict XIII.

Lichton enjoyed an amicable relationship with the most powerful magnate in the area, Alexander Stewart, Lord of Badenoch and Earl of Mar, as Lichton appears to have suffered no harassment, attended the latter's marriage to Isabella, Countess of Mar back in 1404 and procured for him an annulment of that marriage when Stewart chose to remarry in 1415. Lichton was probably a kinsman of Stewart, as he is described as a kinsman of Stewart's uncle, Robert Stewart, Duke of Albany, the man who ruled Scotland as governor until his death in 1420.

== Bishop of Aberdeen ==
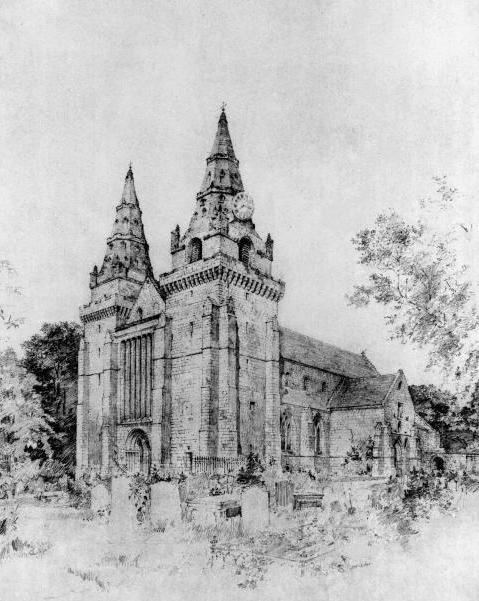
St Machar's Cathedral, Aberdeen; the west front dates from Lichton's episcopate.

After the death of Gilbert de Greenlaw, Bishop of Aberdeen, in 1421, Lichton was chosen as his successor, and was translated to the diocese of Aberdeen in early April 1422, on the authority of Pope Martin V. Pope Martin delegated authority to Robert de Cardeny, Bishop of Dunkeld, and William Stephen, Bishop of Dunblane, in order to take Lichton's oath to the Papal see without forcing him to travel to Rome. It is of note that Lichton had already been in possession of the prebend of Kinkell in the Aberdeen diocese, a former possession of the Knights Hospitaller but attached to Aberdeen Cathedral by Lichton's time.

As Bishop of Aberdeen, Lichton was one of its greatest builders. The Aberdeen Registrum noted that he began to rebuild the cathedral, and Hector Boece gave a description of his rebuilding, noting that although he finished the walls and two belltowers, the third belltower remained unfinished at his death. Lichton also constructed a new chapel dedicated to St John the Evangelist, and donated much of his own money to new service books and vestments, as well as to the reconstruction of the cathedral. He also authored several legal and religious texts, though none have survived.

== Diplomatic career ==
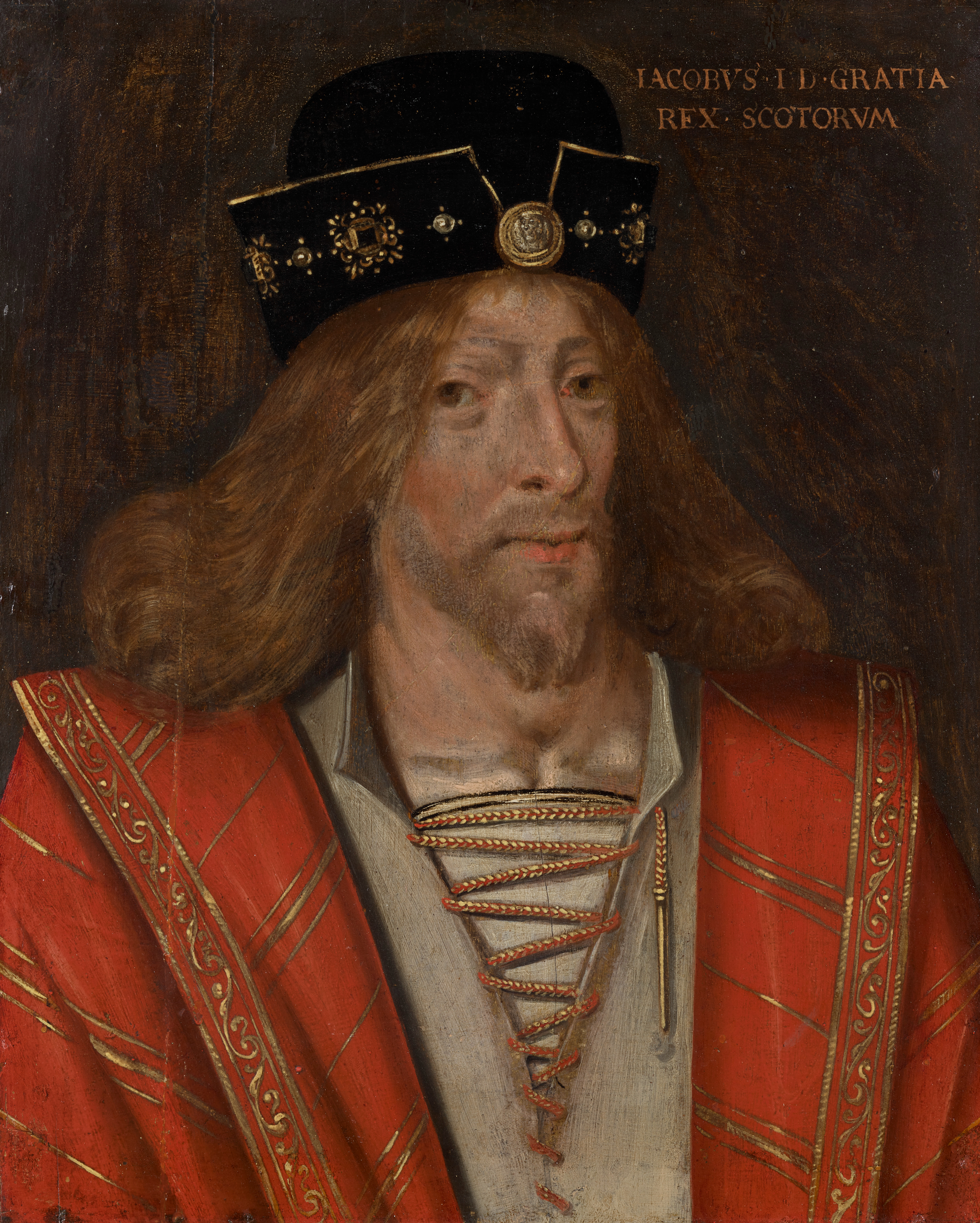
Portrait of James I, King of Scots.

Henry was frequently used as an ambassador by the king, James I of Scotland. According to the 16th century Bishop of Ross and historian John Lesley, Henry was one of the men sent to England to arrange the ransom of King James - held in England for most of his youth, not being released until 1424. On 9 June 1425, he and other prelates received a safe-conduct from King Henry VI of England enabling them to travel through England on their way to visit Pope Martin V at Rome. In 1428, Henry was the leader of an embassy sent to King Charles VII of France for a marriage proposal and to renew the Franco-Scottish alliance, and in January 1430, was sent into England for discussion of various grievances. On 31 March 1434, Lichton is found in attendance at the Council of Basel, though no more details of his activities there have survived.

== Death ==
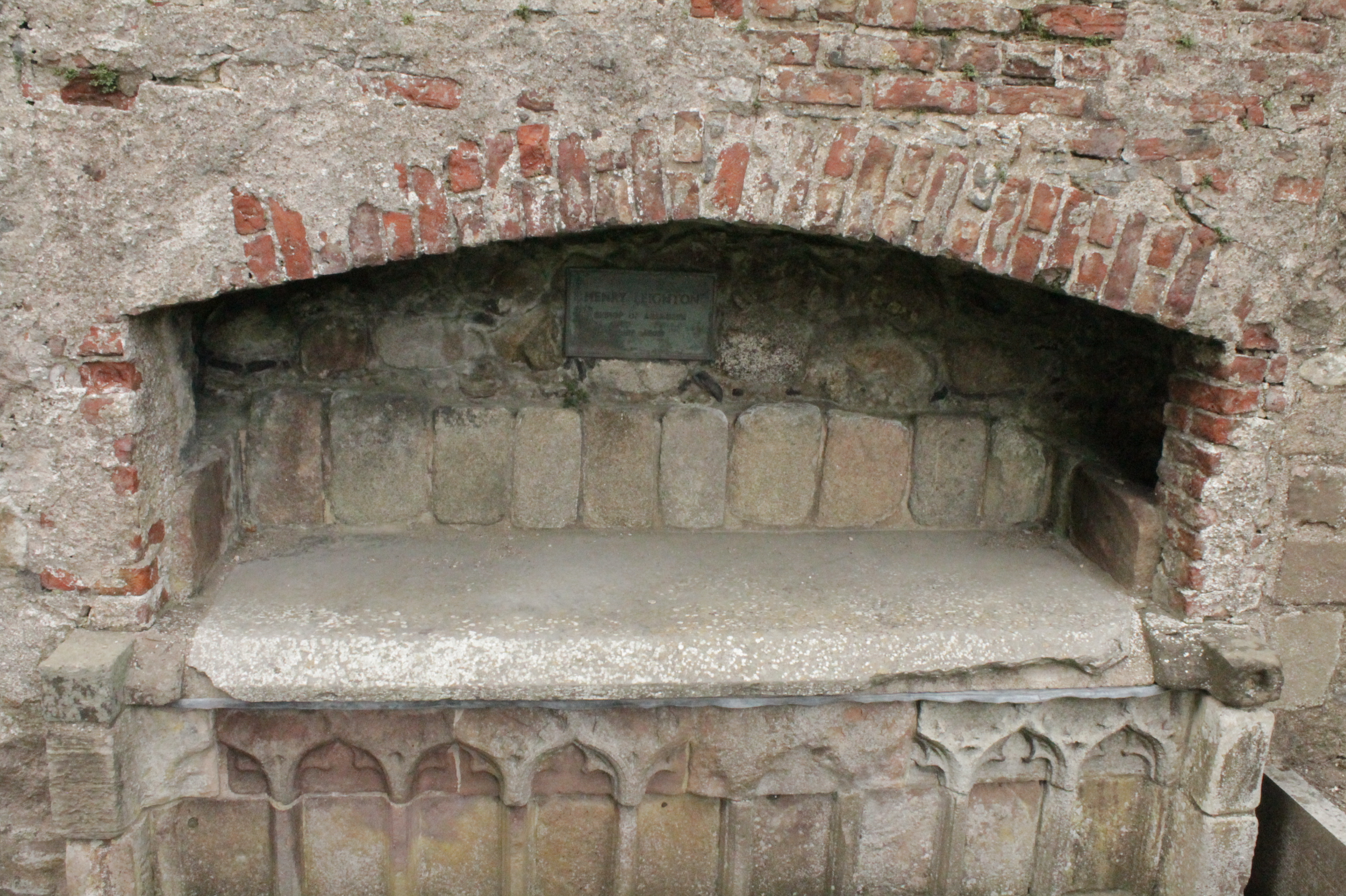
Bishop Leighton's grave, St Machar's Cathedral

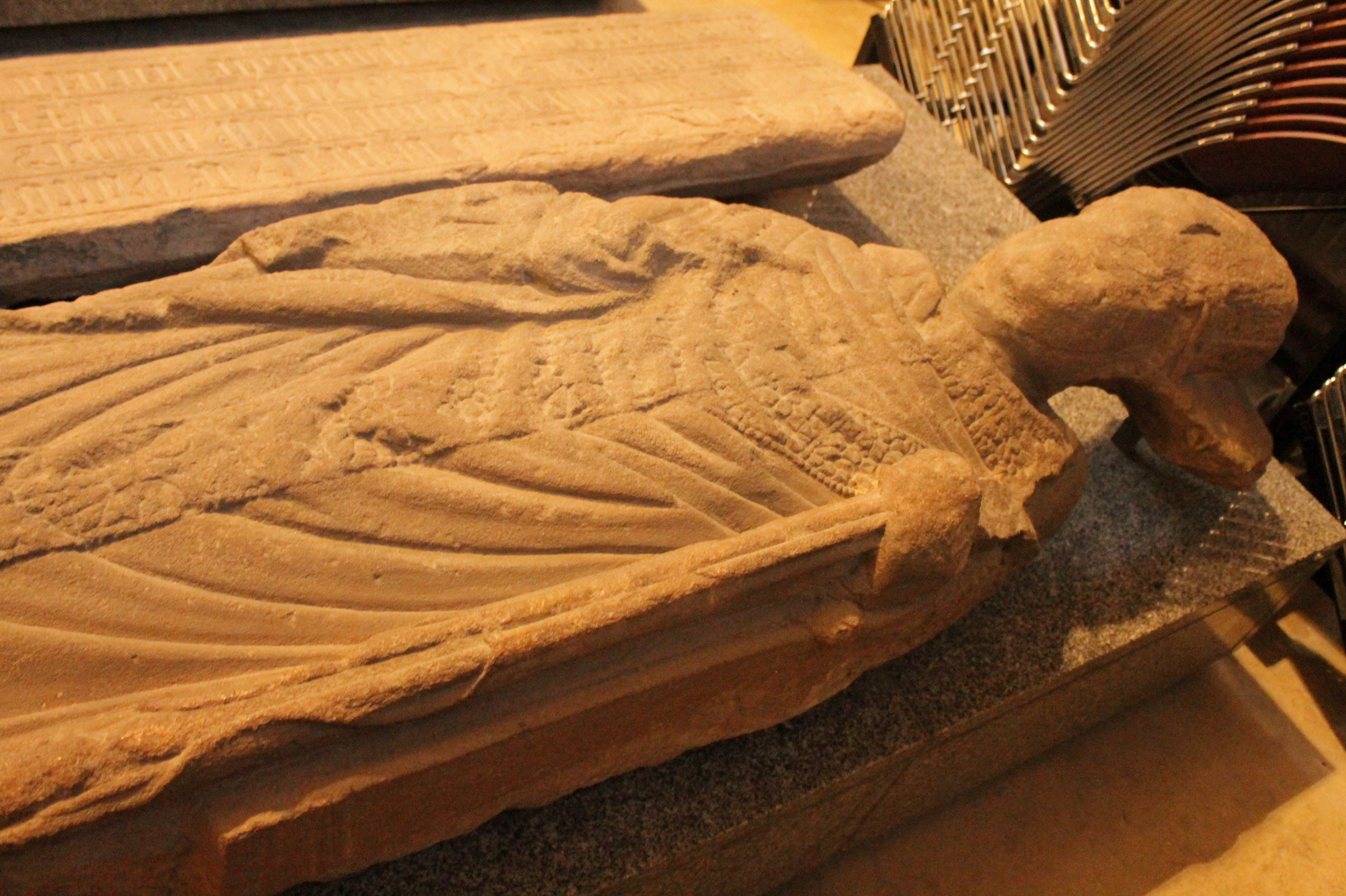
Effigy of Bishop Henry Lichtoun, St Machar's Cathedral

Lichton's death cannot be precisely dated. It fell between 11 November (Martinmas) 1440, and 11 January 1441; it is probable that he died on either 12 or 14 December, because these were the anniversaries given to him in the 15th century and the 16th century respectively. He was buried in his new chapel, the one dedicated to St John the Evangelist. As a churchman, Lichton could never marry and did not; he did however father a bastard, a daughter named Janet, who appeared in the records receiving papal dispensation to marry in 1432.

Due to curtailment of the cathedral the grave now lies in what appears as a simple enclosure on the east end of the cathedral i.e. it is no longer internal. Due to its exposure, the grave is now somewhat ruinous. The stone effigy of the bishop has been moved and now lies on display in the northwest corner of the cathedral.

== Notes ==
Religious titles
Preceded by Thomas Trail	Archdeacon of Aberdeen; 1395–1396	Succeeded by David Falconer
Preceded by John de Innes	Bishop of Moray; 1414–1422	Succeeded by Columba de Dunbar
Preceded by Gilbert de Greenlaw	Bishop of Aberdeen; 1422–1440	Succeeded by Ingram Lindsay
