= Auld Alliance =

1295–1560 Scottish-French alliance

- Formation: 23 October 1295
- Founded at: Paris
- Members: Kingdom of Scotland; Kingdom of France
- Official language: French; Scots; Scottish Gaelic

The Auld Alliance (Scots for "Old Alliance") was an alliance between the kingdoms of Scotland and France against England made in 1295. This Scots term has come to denote the long-lasting association between the two countries. The alliance was never formally revoked, although it is considered by some to have ended with the signing of the Treaty of Edinburgh in 1560.

The alliance played a significant role in the relations among Scotland, France and England. The alliance was renewed by all the French and Scottish monarchs of that period except Louis XI. By the late 14th century, the renewal occurred regardless of whether either kingdom was at war with England at the time.

The alliance began with the treaty signed by John Balliol and Philip IV of France in 1295 against Edward I of England. The terms of the treaty stipulated that if either country were attacked by England, the other country would invade English territory. The 1513 Battle of Flodden, where the Scots invaded England in response to the English campaign against France, was one such occasion. Thomas Randolph, Earl of Moray, negotiated the renewal of the alliance in 1326. The alliance played an important role in the Wars of Scottish Independence, the Hundred Years' War, the War of the League of Cambrai, and the Rough Wooing.

== History ==
=== Birth of the Auld Alliance ===
Following dynastic turmoil in Scotland caused by the death of seven-year-old queen-designate, Margaret, the Maid of Norway in 1290, Edward I of England took the opportunity to extend his authority over Scotland. In response, the Council of Twelve, which had taken over the government of Scotland temporarily, sought to find allies abroad. Alliance with France was a logical fit, as Philip IV declared England's possession of Gascony forfeit in 1294, bringing France and England close to war. In October 1295, a Scottish embassy to France agreed to the Treaty of Paris, which was signed on 23 October.

As with all subsequent renewals of what became the Auld Alliance, the treaty favoured France. The French were required to do no more than continue their struggle against the English in Gascony. The cost of any war between Scotland and England was to be borne entirely by the Scots. Nevertheless, Scotland, as remote and impoverished as it was, was now allied to a major European power. Even if they were more symbolic than actual, the benefits of the alliance mattered greatly to Scotland.

In the short term, however, the treaty proved to be no protection against Edward, whose swift and devastating invasion of Scotland in 1296 all but eradicated its independence. Furthermore, the cessation of hostilities between England and France in 1299, followed by the treaty of "perpetual peace and friendship," allowed Edward to devote all of his attention and forces to attacking the Scots. In the end, Scotland owed its eventual survival to the military acumen and inspiration of Robert the Bruce and the mistakes of Edward II, rather than to its bond with France. In 1326, Robert the Bruce sent Thomas Randolph, 1st Earl of Moray to negotiate renewal of the alliance with the Treaty of Corbeil. The motive for this renewal was precautionary: neither realm seemed to have much to fear from England at the time.

=== Hundred Years' War ===
However, this changed after 1332, when Edward III set out to conquer Scotland and reassert his power in France. For the first time, the Franco-Scottish alliance acquired a sense of emergency. In the winter of 1332, King Philip dispatched a flotilla of ten ships to Scotland with aid, but they were blown off course in a storm and never arrived. In the spring of 1334, £1000 arrived from France to be distributed to the Scottish defenders along with an offer of sanctuary to young David II of Scotland, his queen and members of his court. In May 1334, the two monarchs arrived, along with their confessors, tutors in arts and in arms, the king's sisters, the Douglas children, the late regent's sons, other children of Scottish nobles, a number of clerics, and nobles who would act as envoys between the court in exile, the French and the defenders at home in Scotland. They were given Château Gaillard as a residence. In 1334, peace talks between France and England were proposed, but when King Philip insisted that the Scots be included, King Edward broke off the talks. In addition to sending regular supplies to the Scots, the French paid an annual pension of £2000 for the upkeep of King David's court in exile. In June 1339, William Douglas, Lord of Liddesdale visited King David in France and returned to Scotland, taking with him Arnoul d'Audrehen in command of 200 French troops as well as several ships which aided in the capture of Perth.

In June and again in July 1346, King Philip of France wrote desperate letters to King David begging him to attack England, hoping to draw off the looming English attack in France. In light of this, the Scots planned a chevauchee in the north of England. Edward overwhelmed French forces at the Battle of Crécy in August before the planned Scottish attack. Despite that it was too late to help the situation of the French, King David and his advisors decided to go ahead with the chevauchee, possibly believing it would repay a considerable debt to France for their aid. However, the English, even without King Edward, raised an effective defence. King David was captured at the Battle of Neville's Cross.

In March 1355, John II of France commanded Sire Eugene de Garancières to lead a force of sixty knights and their retinues, probably a force of about two hundred men, to Scotland to join the Scots in an attack on northern English strongholds. The Scots did not agree to make the attack until the receipt of the promised payment of 40,000 mouton d’or, which was distributed to the chief leaders of the Scots. They then marched to the vicinity of Norham Castle, where Sir William Ramsay lured the defenders of the castle out by driving away their herds of cattle. He then led the English into an ambush by William, Lord of Douglas and the French. The English were defeated, and Thomas Grey (chronicler) was taken prisoner, to be held for a substantial ransom. They then withdrew to Scotland in order to make an approach by sea and land on the beach of Berwick-upon-Tweed. They made an escalade attack on the walls. Although taking the city, they failed to take Berwick Castle. Robert II of Scotland, presently Earl of Strathern and heir to the throne of Scotland, made his only venture south of the English border to order them to withdraw back to Scotland. The French force then returned home.

Some Scottish knights continued, during truces, to go to France to aid their allies. William Douglas, 1st Earl of Douglas led 200 men-at-arms and forty knights to fight with the French at the Battle of Poitiers. The king's 11-year absence as Edward's prisoner only increased the internal turmoil and power struggles within Scotland. David II was forced to make a deal with Edward III to gain his freedom. After his release in 1357, while resisting more conflict with England, David successfully consolidated royal power in Scotland and cut down the power of the barons who opposed him with the help of Archibald Douglas, 3rd Earl of Douglas.

The accession of pro-French Robert II led to immediate renewal in 1371, with the embassy of the Bishop of Glasgow and the Lord of Galloway to France. The treaty was signed by Charles V at the Château de Vincennes on 30 June, and at Edinburgh Castle by Robert II on 28 October. The benefits to Scotland were mixed. The Scots benefited from the successful raids of the French admiral Jean de Vienne's on the southern coast of England which relieved military pressure on them. In 1385 Vienne used a 180 ship fleet to land an army in Scotland with the intent of invading England, but the force had to withdraw. This caused relations between France and Scotland to deteriorate which was summed up by the French chronicler Jean Froissart when he "wished the King of France would make a truce with the English for two or three years and then march to Scotland and utterly destroy it".

However, necessity had driven the two kingdoms together and the need to resist aggressive new Lancastrian kings kept the alliance together in the 15th century. In 1418, with France on the brink of surrendering to the forces of Henry V, the Dauphin, Charles VII, called on his Scottish allies for help. Between 1419 and 1424, as many as 15,000 Scottish troops were sent to France.

French and Scottish forces together won against the English at the Battle of Baugé in 1421. It marked the turning point of the Hundred Years War, but the victory was short-lived for Scotland. The Scots army was defeated at Verneuil in 1424. Despite this defeat, the Scots had given France a valuable breathing space, effectively ensuring the continued power of the French state.

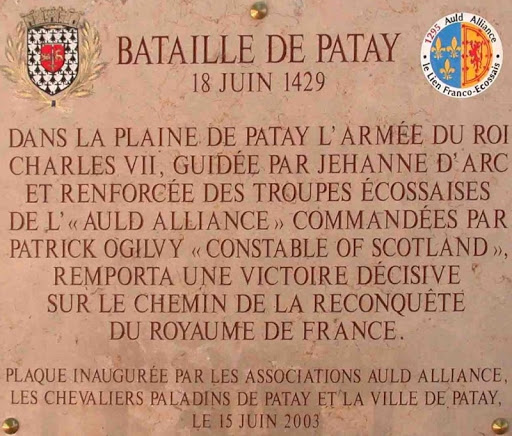
Patay (Loiret), plaque commemorating the Battle of Patay (1429) and the Scottish forces that aided Joan of Arc. Also mentioned here is Patrick Ogilvy, who was Constable of Scotland and the commander who led the Scottish men at arms at Patay

In 1429, Scots came to the aid of Joan of Arc in her famous relief of Orléans, and a large portion of the French Army up until the end of the Loire Valley Campaign was made of Scots men at arms and archers. Scottish soldiers also served in the Garde Écossaise, the loyal bodyguard of the French crown. Many members of the Scottish expeditions to France chose to settle there. Some officers were granted lands and titles in France. In the 15th and 16th centuries, they became naturalised French subjects. Through the rest of the 15th century, the alliance was formally renewed four times, until the eventual victory of France in the Hundred Years War.

=== Wars of the Roses ===
The English defeat in the Hundred Years War, followed by the internal civil war, the Wars of the Roses, left the English position weakened. In 1460 King James II of Scotland attempted to retake Roxburgh and Berwick castle. The siege, whilst successful in capturing Roxburgh, caused King James II's early death at 29, after Scottish cannon exploded next to him. While the regents reigned Scotland until King James III was old enough to rule, Margaret of Anjou made a compromise by giving Berwick to Scotland in 1461 in exchange that they would aid the Lancastrian cause in the war. Scotland agreed and together they gained their victory in the Battle of Wakefield with the death of Richard of York. Margaret of Anjou made a similar compromise the same year with Scotland's ally, France by giving them Jersey in exchange for support for the Lancastrian cause. In a way, the Auld Alliance was engaging in a war caused by their own victory in the Hundred Years War.

The true reasoning for the alliance's existence was to fight against the English, not to end up aiding one side in their enemy's own civil war. Their reason being was that the Yorkist had sided with the Burgundian State, and with the Yorkists on the throne meant that the English would return to fight France through Burgundy. Neither France nor Scotland had the stomach to fight after the Hundred Years War that the former was recovering from. To prevent England from becoming strong enough to fight against them, the allies created a proxy war out of it by siding with their former enemy in the last phases of the Hundred Years War, and Yorkists enemy, the Lancastrians. Not wanting a repeat of Wakefield when Henry VI and Margret fled to Scotland in 1464, Edward IV made a peace with Scotland with the Treaty of York. That peace however was short lived because once the Yorkists won the war and exterminated the Lancastrians, the Yorkists managed to regain England's lost possessions of Jersey from France in 1468 and Berwick from Scotland in 1482. Around the same time, with the Treaty of Arras, the Burgundy threat to France was subdued. After the Lancastrians became extinct, Henry Tudor had been in exile in Brittany. From there, he made attempts to take the throne but failed. But when Henry went to exile in France to escape pro-Yorkists supporters, Henry was able to gain French and Scottish support from King Charles VII of France. Together, they landed in Wales and with Welsh allies defeated the Yorkist King Richard III at the Battle of Bosworth Field in 1485. When Henry VII married Elizabeth of York, it ended England's turmoiled war and began its gradual recovery with the Tudor Dynasty. To maintain peace with the Franco-Scottish alliance as the sixteenth century began, Henry VII gave to marriage his eldest daughter, Margaret Tudor to James IV of Scotland and his younger daughter, Mary Tudor to Louis XII of France. The marriage of Margaret to James gave their descendants a claim to both the English and the Scottish thrones.

=== Reformation and decline ===
The alliance underwent a dramatic revival when it was formally reviewed in 1512 and again in 1517 and 1548. Scotland still suffered badly following the death of James IV and most of his nobles at Flodden in 1513. Periodic Anglo-French and Anglo-Scottish conflict throughout the sixteenth century continued, but the certainties that had driven the Auld Alliance were disappearing. As Protestantism gained ground in Scotland, more and more people favoured closer links with England than with France.

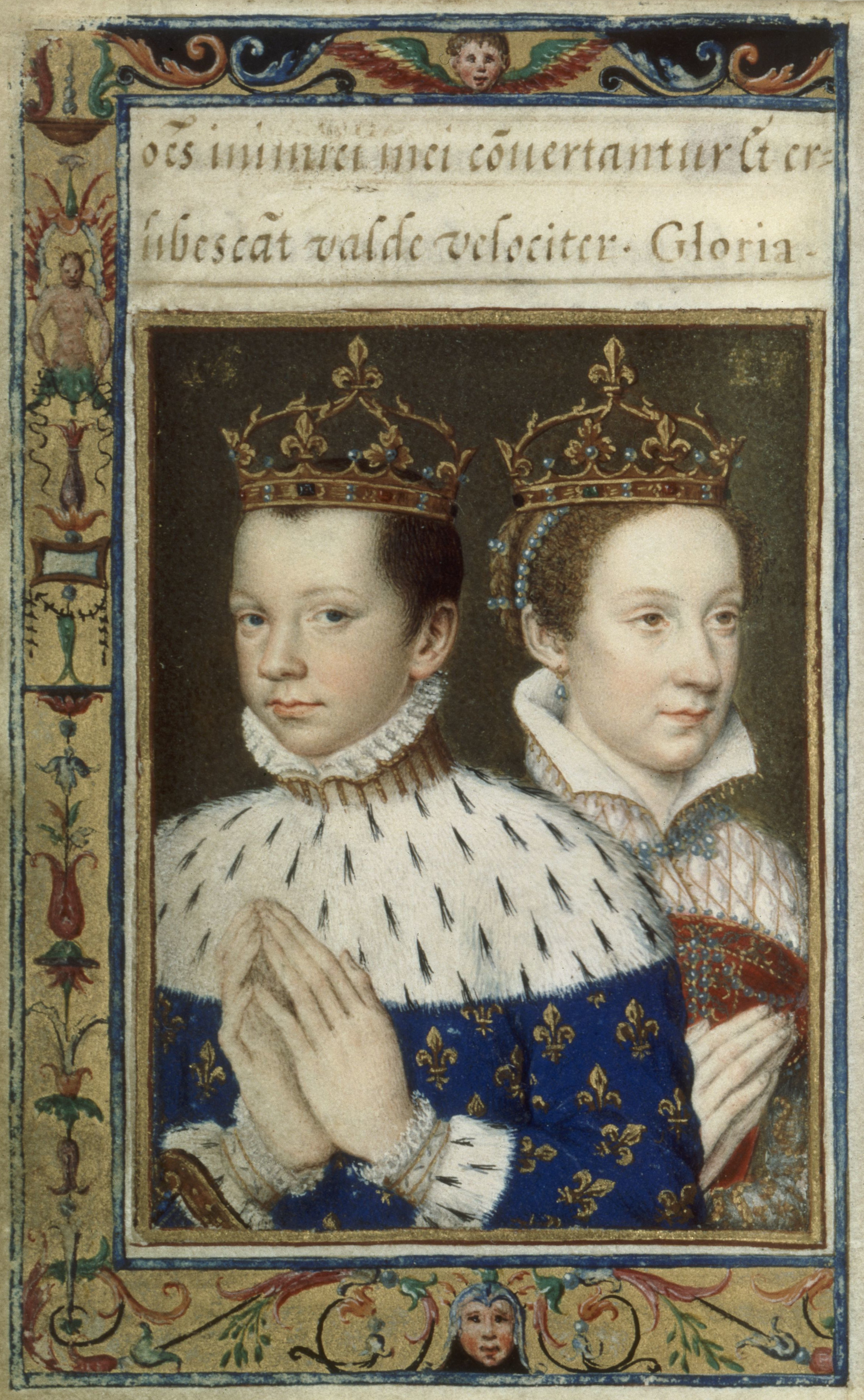
The marriage of Mary, Queen of Scots with Francis II of France briefly revived the Auld Alliance

In 1558, the alliance between the two kingdoms was revived with the marriage of Mary, Queen of Scots to the future Francis II of France, but it lasted only until 1560 when Francis died prematurely.

Scotland was transformed into a Protestant nation by the Scottish Reformation of 1560, despite resistance by the Catholic French Regent Mary of Guise who was supported by French troops. During the Reformation, the Protestant Lords of the Congregation rejected the Auld Alliance and brokered English military support with their treaty of Berwick. At the Scottish Reformation Parliament, Scotland was declared Protestant, and allied itself with Protestant England instead. The Treaty of Edinburgh ended the conflict and formal ties between Scotland and France, although Mary, Queen of Scots, remained reluctant to ratify the treaty.

Two hundred Scottish soldiers were sent to Normandy in 1562 to aid the French Huguenots in their struggle against royal authority during the French Wars of Religion. After the exile of Queen Mary to England in 1568, James VI, who was also heir to the English throne, desired to form close ties with England, and England's complete removal from the French mainland after Calais, meant that the alliance had outlived its usefulness.

=== After the treaty of Edinburgh ===
Although abolished in 1560, the Auld Alliance still lived on with the Catholic Scots. Throughout the seventeenth century since the House of Stuart acquired the English throne, aside from the Wars of the Three Kingdoms and Oliver Cromwell's short-lived Commonwealth, relations between England and Scotland, including France for the most part, was neutral. That all changed in the Williamite War when the Stuart Catholic King James VII and II was deposed in favour of the Protestant William of Orange, husband to James's eldest daughter, Mary II. After losing in Ireland, and Scotland before the century came to a close, James went into exile in France, and through his lineage there would try to retake the crown with their Catholic Scots and French backed allies in the Jacobite Wars throughout the early and mid eighteenth century, with the closest from Bonnie Prince Charlie getting as far south as Swarkestone Bridge near Derby before retreating back to Scotland. After Culloden in 1746 and the Highland Clearances soon after, some of the exiled Jacobites in the New World aided their French ally in the Seven Years' War, even on the side of the Patriots in the American War of Independence, an echo to when the Auld Alliance started almost 500 years ago. The Garde Écossaise, since their founding in 1418 continued to protect the kings of France until 412 years later in 1830, when Charles X of France abdicated. In 1848, France abolished the monarchy after restoring it in 1815 after the French Revolution and the Napoleonic War, and once more became a Republic under Napoleon III.

== Wider influence ==
The Auld Alliance extended into the lives of the Scottish population in a number of ways, affecting architecture, law, the Scots language, and cuisine, among other things. Scottish soldiers served within the French army; there were reciprocal dual nationality agreements; and France granted privileges to Scottish vintners. Many Scots studied at French universities, something which continued up until the Napoleonic Wars. David de Moravia, the 14th-century Bishop of Moray, helped found the Scots College of the University of Paris in 1333. Among those who studied or taught at French universities were: the poets John Barbour and George Buchanan; the historian Hector Boece; the founder of St Andrews University, Henry Wardlaw; the founder of Aberdeen University, William Elphinstone; the founder of the Advocates Library, George Mackenzie, and the noted translator of Rabelais, Sir Thomas Urquhart. Scottish castles built with French construction in mind include Bothwell and Kildrummy.

== Legacy ==
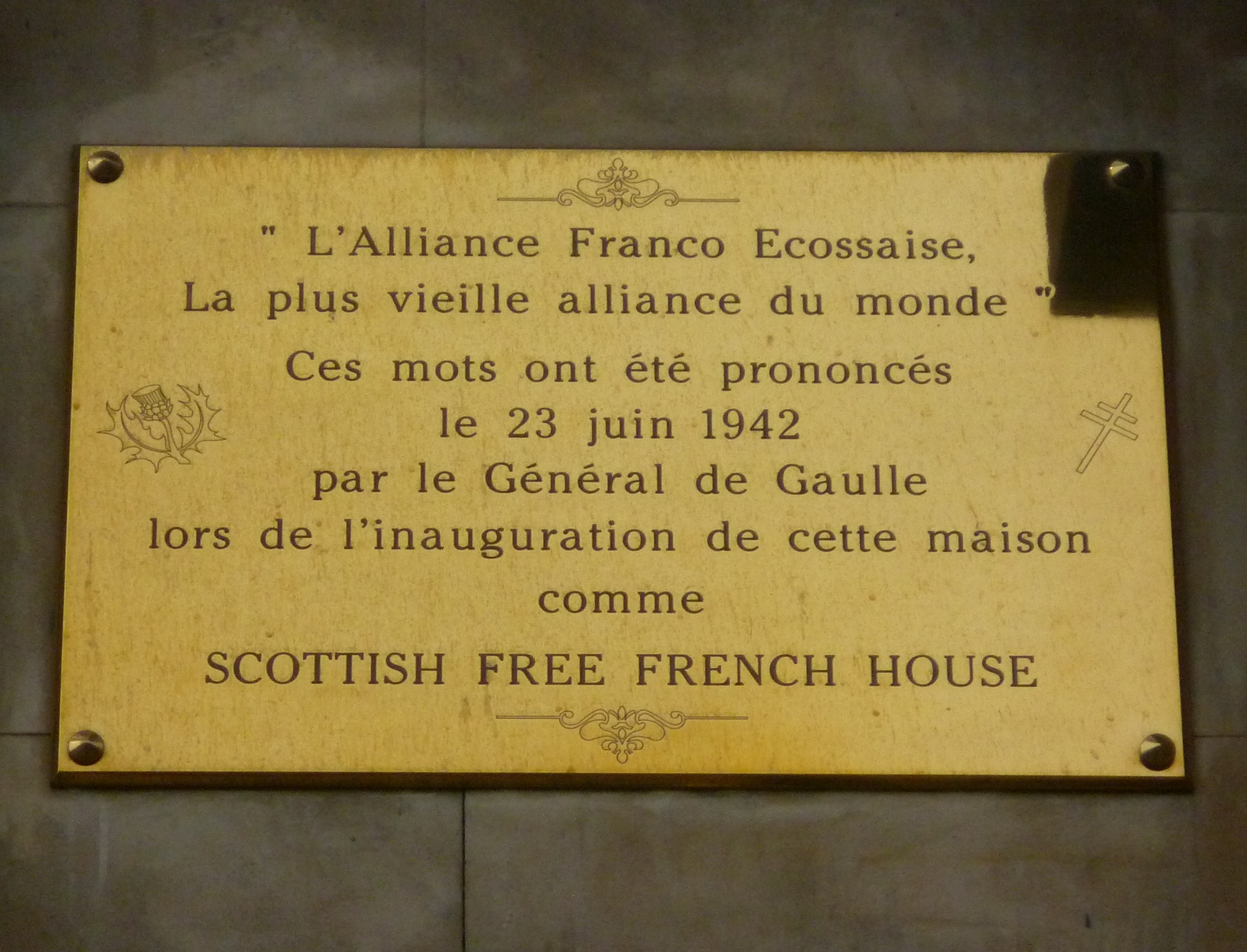
"La plus vieille alliance du monde"

In a speech which he delivered in Edinburgh in June 1942, Charles de Gaulle described the alliance between Scotland and France as "the oldest alliance in the world". He also declared that:

In every combat where for five centuries the destiny of France was at stake, there were always men of Scotland to fight side by side with men of France, and what Frenchmen feel is that no people has ever been more generous than yours with its friendship.

In 1995, celebrations were held in both countries marking the 700th anniversary of the beginning of the alliance.

In the Six Nations Championship, a rugby union tournament played between England, Wales, Scotland, Ireland, France and Italy, the Auld Alliance Trophy is played for when Scotland and France play their match.

After extensive research, British historian Siobhan Talbott concluded that the Auld Alliance had never been formally revoked and that it endured and thrived long after the Acts of Union in 1707 and the Entente Cordiale of 1904.

== See also ==
- Duke of Aubigny
- Duke of Lennox
- Foreign alliances of France
- France–United Kingdom relations
- Treaty of Edinburgh, 1560, brought a century of peace among Scotland, France and England
- Tudor period, English responses.
