= Ingram Lindsay =

Scottish bishop (died 1458)

- Bishop of Aberdeen
- Church: Roman Catholic Church
- See: Diocese of Aberdeen
- In office: 1441–1458
- Predecessor: Henry de Lichton
- Successor: Thomas Spens
- Previous post: Precentor of Moray

Orders
- Consecration: 1441

Personal details
- Born: late 14th century or early 15th century Scotland.
- Died: 24 August 1458 Aberdeen

Ingram Lindsay [Ingeram de Lindesay], Doctor in Canon Law, was a 15th-century Scottish cleric. Despite being of illegitimate birth - one of several sons of an unmarried nobleman and an unmarried woman - he nevertheless managed in the end to pursue a successful ecclesiastical career.

Pope Martin V provided him as Archdeacon of Dunkeld on 21 January 1421, but this was unsuccessful; likewise he was Dean of the Collegiate Church of Dunbar in 1422, but only for a year or under. Ingram was in possession of the church of "Kynnore" (Kinnoir), a Moray prebend, by 1430, and possessed a canonry and prebend in the diocese of Brechin and a vicarage in the diocese of Glasgow when he was made Precentor of Elgin Cathedral in 1431, a position he held until 1441. He had also briefly been Chancellor of Moray between 1430 and 1431.

It was in 1441 that Ingram attained the peak of his career, being elected Bishop of Aberdeen by the chapter; he was confirmed in this position by Pope Eugenius IV on 28 April. Not too much can be said about Ingram's episcopate. Among other things, Bishop Ingram is known to have put a stone roof on Aberdeen Cathedral, paved its floor with free stone and added the churches of Monymusk and Ruthven to the cathedral prebends. He is said to have fallen out with the king, James II of Scotland, by refusing to accommodate James' wish that some benefices be bestowed on certain royal followers. Ingram died at Aberdeen on 24 August 1458. Bishop Ingram was an active scholastic theologian, and is known to have written various theological and biblical commentaries.

== Notes ==
Religious titles
Preceded by Henry de Lichton	Bishop of Aberdeen; 1441–1458	Succeeded by Thomas Spens
