= Gilbert de Greenlaw =

Scottish bishop

- Bishop of Aberdeen
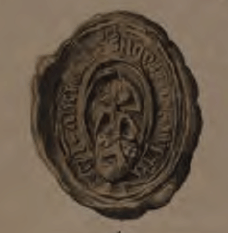
- Church: Roman Catholic Church
- See: Diocese of Aberdeen
- In office: 1390–1421
- Predecessor: Adam de Tyningham
- Successor: Henry de Lichton
- Previous post(s): Bishop-elect of St Andrews

Orders
- Consecration: 1390

Personal details
- Born: 1354; North-east Scotland.
- Died: 1421; Probably Aberdeen

Gilbert de Greenlaw (1354–1421) was a medieval Bishop of Aberdeen and Bishop-elect of St. Andrews. He was a Licentiate in the Arts, and had been a canon of Bishopric of Moray by the late 1370s, before being provided by Avignon Pope Clement VII the church of Liston in the Bishopric of St. Andrews in 1379. By the later 1380s, he was in the diocese of Aberdeen. In 1389, he was elected to hold the bishopric of Aberdeen, a position to which he was consecrated in 1390. Gilbert subsequently went on to hold the position of Chancellor of Scotland for many years, albeit in an interrupted manner. Gilbert was subsequently postulated to the more prestigious bishopric of St. Andrews after the death of Walter de Danyelston, its previous Bishop-elect. However, Avignon Pope Benedict XIII quashed the postulation, and chose Henry Wardlaw in his stead. Gilbert, then, remained Bishop of Aberdeen, and died in 1421.

Religious titles
Preceded by Adam de Tynyngham	Bishop of Aberdeen; 1389/1390–1422	Succeeded by Henry de Lychtone
Preceded by Walter de Danyelston (unconsecrated)	Bishop of St. Andrews post. 1402–1403 (overturned by Pope)	Succeeded by Henry Wardlaw
