= The Brus =

1375 narrative poem by John Barbour

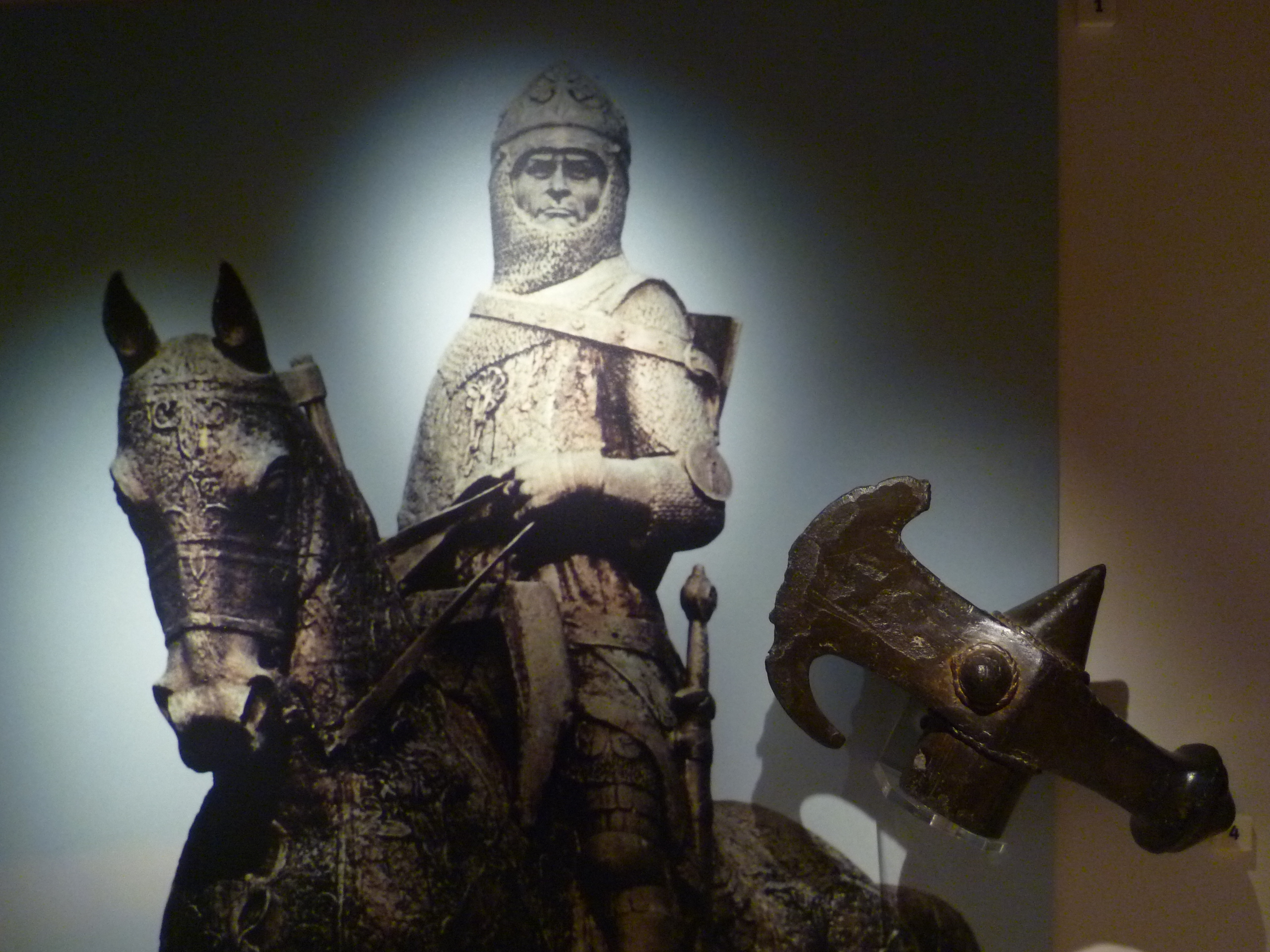
Image of the Bruce, the main focus of the poem

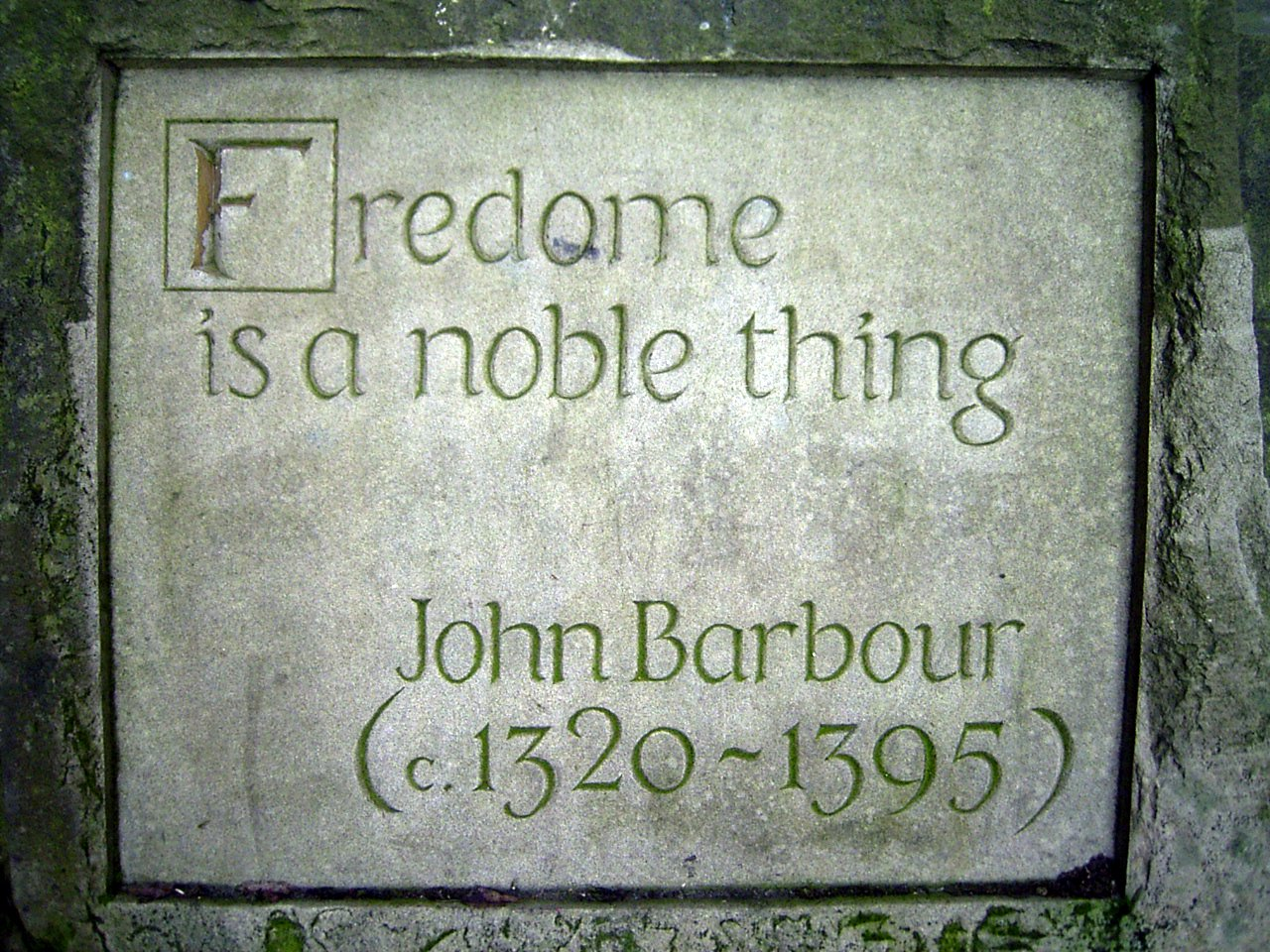
A, fredome is a noble thing, part of the most-cited passage from Barbour's Brus.

The Brus, also known as The Bruce, is a long narrative poem, in Early Scots, of just under 14,000 octosyllabic lines composed by John Barbour which gives a historic and chivalric account of the actions of Robert the Bruce and Sir James Douglas in the Scottish Wars of Independence during a period from the circumstances leading up to the English invasion of 1296 through to Scotland's restored position in the years between the Treaty of 1328 and the death of Thomas Randolph, Earl of Moray, in 1332.

== Background ==
The poem's centre-piece (literally) is an extensive account of the Battle of Bannockburn of 1314. Barbour's poetic account of these events is a keystone in Scotland's national story. The description of the battle is Barbour’s masterpiece.

The poem was written about 1375, "...to throw behind the new king, Robert II (who gave Barbour a pension) the weight of his grandfather's (Bruce's) achievements and reputation." Barbour's work is a romance based upon a lost life of Douglas and a chronicle or chronicles which told of King Robert and his times. At the beginning of the poem, he conflates three Bruces into the single person of the hero, probably by design. Archie Duncan notes Barbour's fondness for exaggerated numbers for the size of any army. Here and there the order of events is transposed. Despite this, it has been regarded from his own time as, in all details, a trustworthy source for the history of the period.

Throughout the piece, Bruce overshadows all his associates. In book nine, in recounting Edward Bruce's victories in Galloway, Barbour does not relate the whole story, but sums up his worthiness by remarking that "he might have rivaled any of his contemporaries excepting only his brother". The king is a hero of the chivalric type common in contemporary romance; freedom is a "noble thing" to be sought and won at all costs; the opponents of such freedom are shown in the dark colours which history and poetic propriety require; but there is none of the complacency of the merely provincial habit of mind. Many lines are full of vigour; and there are passages of high merit, notably the oft-quoted section beginning "A! fredome is a noble thing".

Despite a number of errors of fact, the account has a greater degree of historical veracity than is usually associated with the verse-chronicle genre (for instance, Blind Harry's Wallace composed in the following century). But it is much more than a rhyming chronicle; it contains many fine descriptive passages, and sings the praises of freedom. Its style is somewhat bald and severe. No one has doubted Barbour's authorship of the Brus, but argument has been attempted to show that the text as we have it is an edited copy, perhaps by John Ramsay, a Perth scribe, who wrote out the two extant texts, one preserved in the Advocates Library, Edinburgh, and the other in the library of St John's College, Cambridge.

== Influence ==
Barbour's influence on later Scottish writers can be seen in Robert Burns' Scots Wha Hae, and Walter Scott's The Lord of the Isles and Castle Dangerous.

== Text ==
Text from The Brus
by Barbour (1375 Transcribed by Ramsay in 1489)
(a) THE POET’S PROEM.

Storyß to rede ar delitabill,
suppoß þat þai be nocht bot fabill,
þan suld storyß þat suthfast wer,
And þai war said on gud maner,
Hawe doubill plesance in heryng.
þe fyrst plesance is þe carpyng,
And þe toþir þe suthfastnes,
þat schawys þe thing rycht as it wes;
And suth thyngis þat ar likand
Tyll mannys heryng ar plesand.
þarfor I wald fayne set my will,
Giff my wyt mycht suffice þartill,
To put in wryt a suthfast story,
þat it lest ay furth in memory,
Swa þat na length of tyme it let,
na ger it haly be forȝet.
For auld storys þat men redys,
Representis to þaim þe dedys
Of stalwart folk þat lywyt ar,
Rycht as þai þan in presence war.
And, certis, þai suld weill hawe pryß
þat in þar tyme war wycht and wyß,
And led thar lyff in gret trawaill,
And oft in hard stour off bataill
Wan [richt] gret price off chewalry,
And war woydit off cowardy.
As wes king Robert off Scotland,
þat hardy wes off hart and hand;
And gud Schyr Iames off Douglas,
þat in his tyme sa worthy was,
þat off hys price & hys bounte
In fer landis renoenyt wes he.
Off þaim I thynk þis buk to ma;
Now god gyff grace þat I may swa
Tret it, and bryng it till endyng,
þat I say nocht bot suthfast thing!

== See also ==
- Scottish literature
