= John Resby =

English priest

John Resby was an English priest and supporter of John Wycliffe. He was executed by burning for heresy in Perth, Scotland, in 1407 or 1408, during the time when Henry Wardlaw was Bishop of St. Andrews. He is regarded as the first Protestant martyr in Scotland.

== Arrest and execution ==
In 1407 Resby was arrested in Perth for teaching Lollard heresies. The regent of Scotland, Robert Stewart, Duke of Albany, opposed Lollardy because of its communistic views, so he allowed the papal inquisitor Laurence of Lindores to deal with Resby as he wished. During his trial, Resby was accused of believing forty different heretical doctrines, including that the pope was not the vicar of Christ. After considering that he had Resby's opinions, Laurence turned him over to the secular authorities to be burned. Some of Resby's writings were secretly preserved by his followers and read down to the time of the Reformation.
