= John Barbour (poet) =

Scottish poet (c.1320 – 1395)

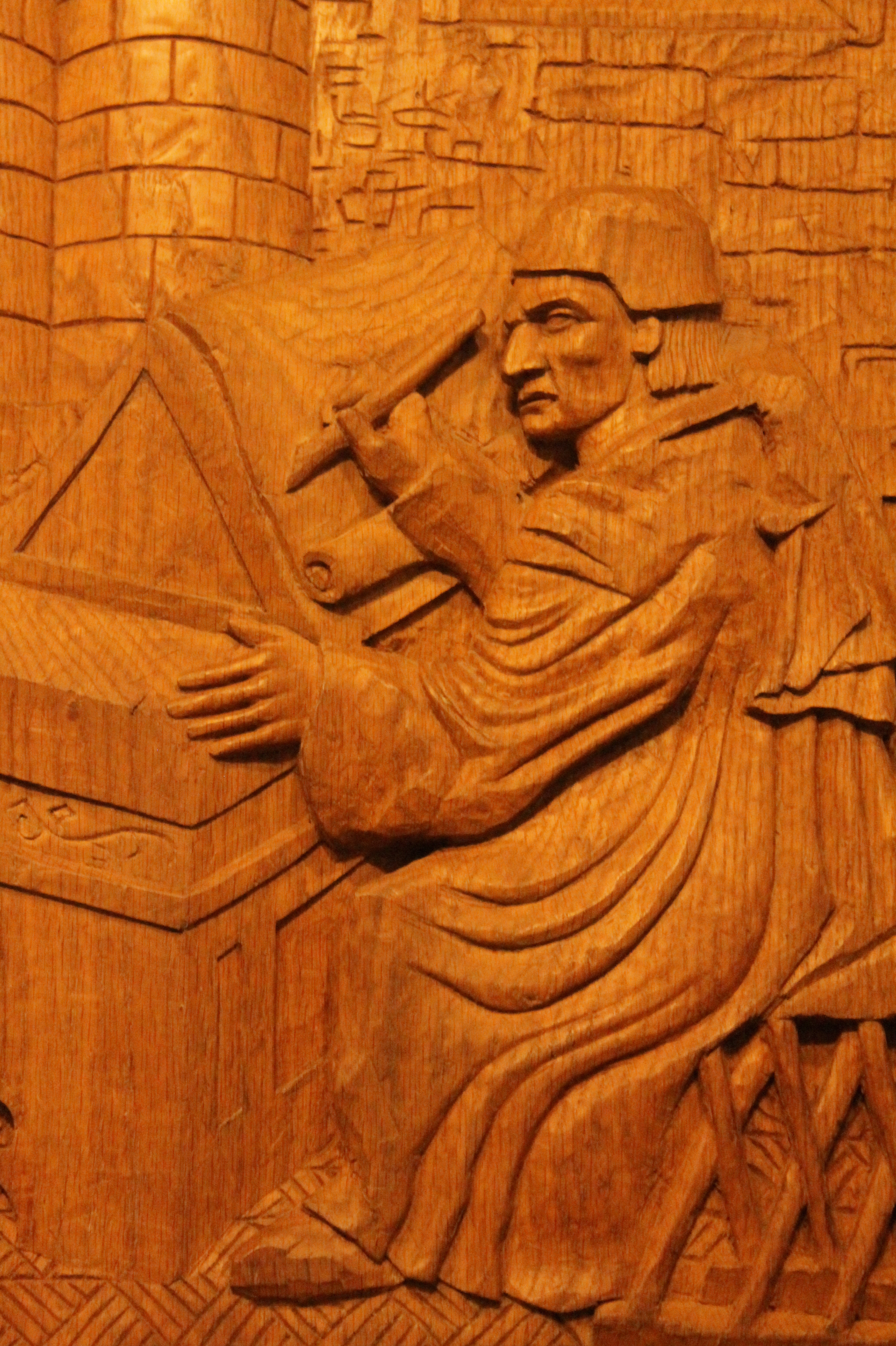
- Born: c. 1320
- Died: 13 March 1395 (aged c. 75); Aberdeen
- Occupations: churchman and poet
- Notable work: The Brus

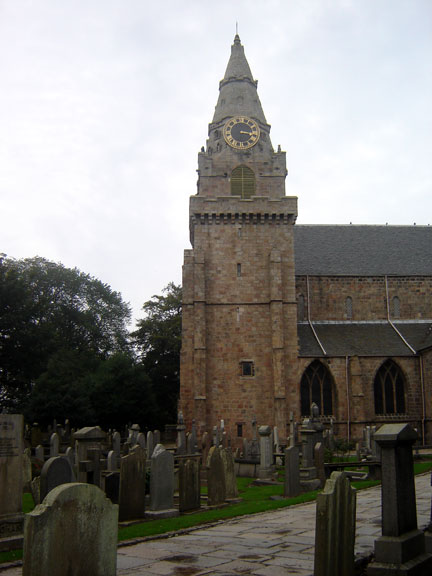
St Machar's Cathedral, where Barbour was archdeacon.

John Barbour (c.1320 – 13 March 1395) was a Scottish poet and the first major named literary figure to write in Scots. His principal surviving work is the historical verse romance, The Brus (The Bruce), and his reputation from this poem is such that other long works in Scots which survive from the period are sometimes thought to be by him. He is known to have written a number of other works, but other titles definitely ascribed to his authorship, such as The Stewartis Oryginalle (Genealogy of the Stewarts) and The Brut (Brutus), are now lost.

Barbour was latterly Archdeacon of the Diocese of Aberdeen in Scotland. He also studied in Oxford and Paris. Although he was a man of the church, his surviving writing is strongly secular in both tone and themes. His principal patron was Robert II and evidence of his promotion and movements before Robert Stewart came to power as king tend to suggest that Barbour acted politically on the future king's behalf.

He died in 1395, probably in Aberdeen.

== Life ==
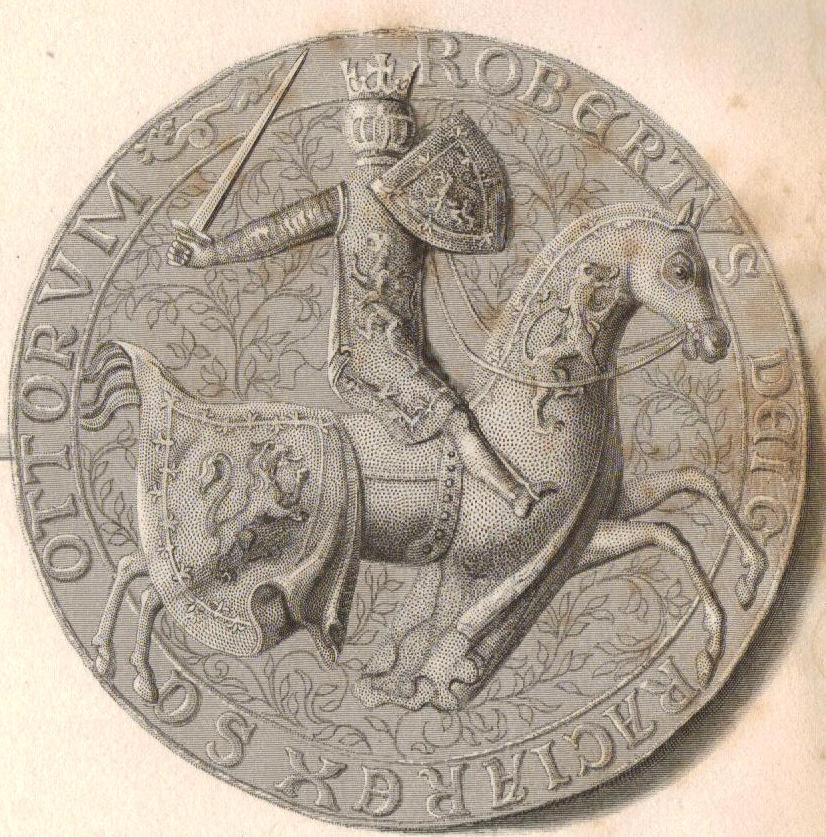
Robert II of Scotland, Barbour's royal patron.

John Barbour may have been born around 1320 if the record of his age in 1375 as 55 is correct. His birthplace is not known, though Aberdeenshire and Galloway have made rival claims.

Barbour's first appearance in the historical record comes in 1356 with promotion to the archdeaconry of Aberdeen from a post he had held for less than a year in Dunkeld Cathedral. It is inferred from this that he was also present in Avignon in 1355. In 1357, when David II returned to Scotland from exile and was restored to active kingship, Barbour received a letter of safe-conduct to travel through England to the University of Oxford. He subsequently appears to have left the country in other years coincidental with periods when David II was active king.

After the death of David II in 1371, Barbour served in the royal court of Robert II in a number of capacities. It was during this time that he composed, The Brus, receiving for this in 1377 the gift of ten pounds Scots, and in 1378 a life-pension of twenty shillings. He held various posts in the king's household. In 1372, he was one of the auditors of exchequer and in 1373 a clerk of audit.

The only biographical evidence for his closing years is his signature as a witness to sundry deeds in the "Register of Aberdeen" in 1392. According to the obit-book of St Machar's Cathedral, Aberdeen he died on 13 March 1395 and state records show that his life-pension was not paid after that date. Barbour made provision for a mass to be sung for himself and his parents, an instruction that was observed in the Cathedral of St Machar until the Reformation.

== Works ==
=== The Brus ===
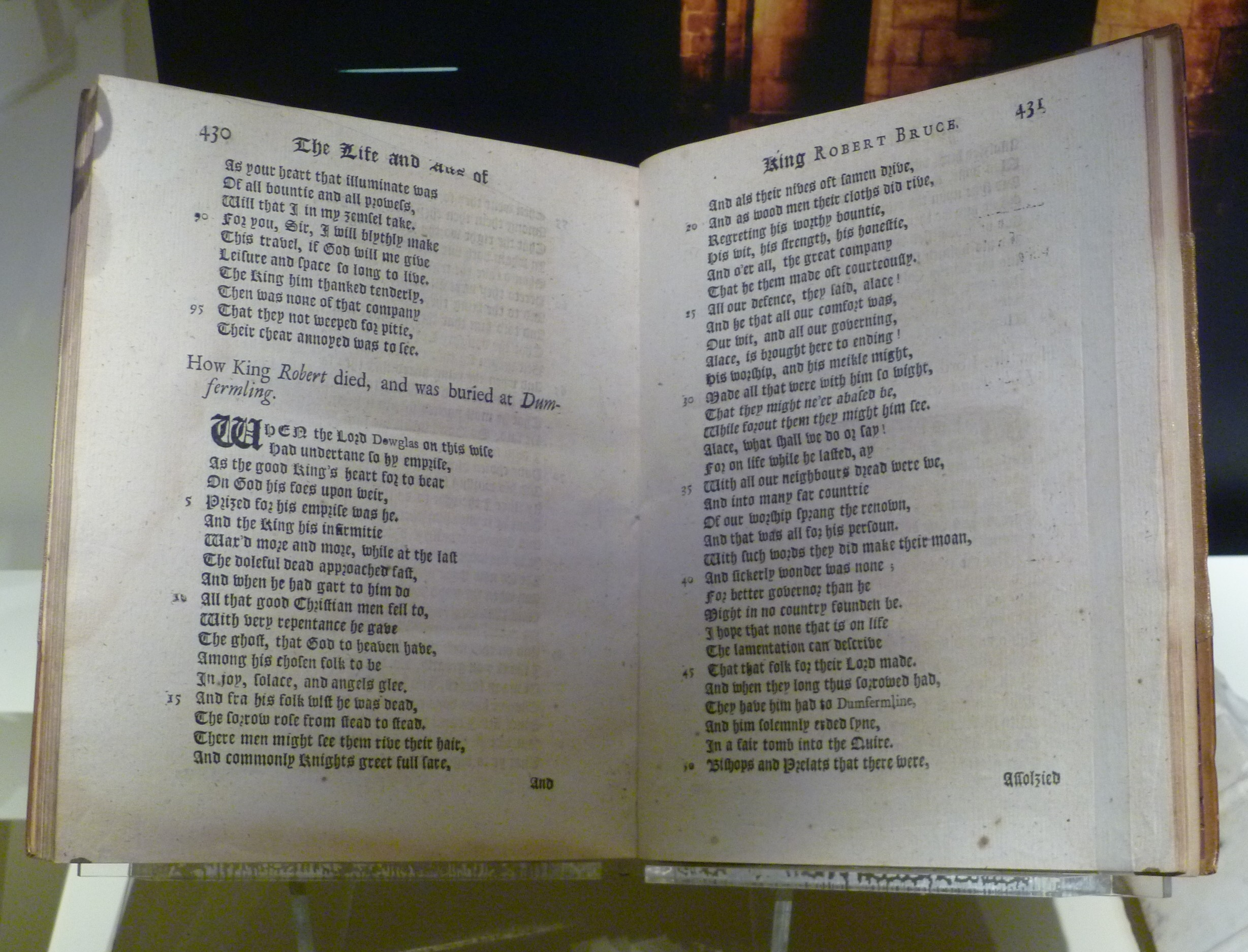
An 18thC edition of The Brus in the National Museum of Scotland

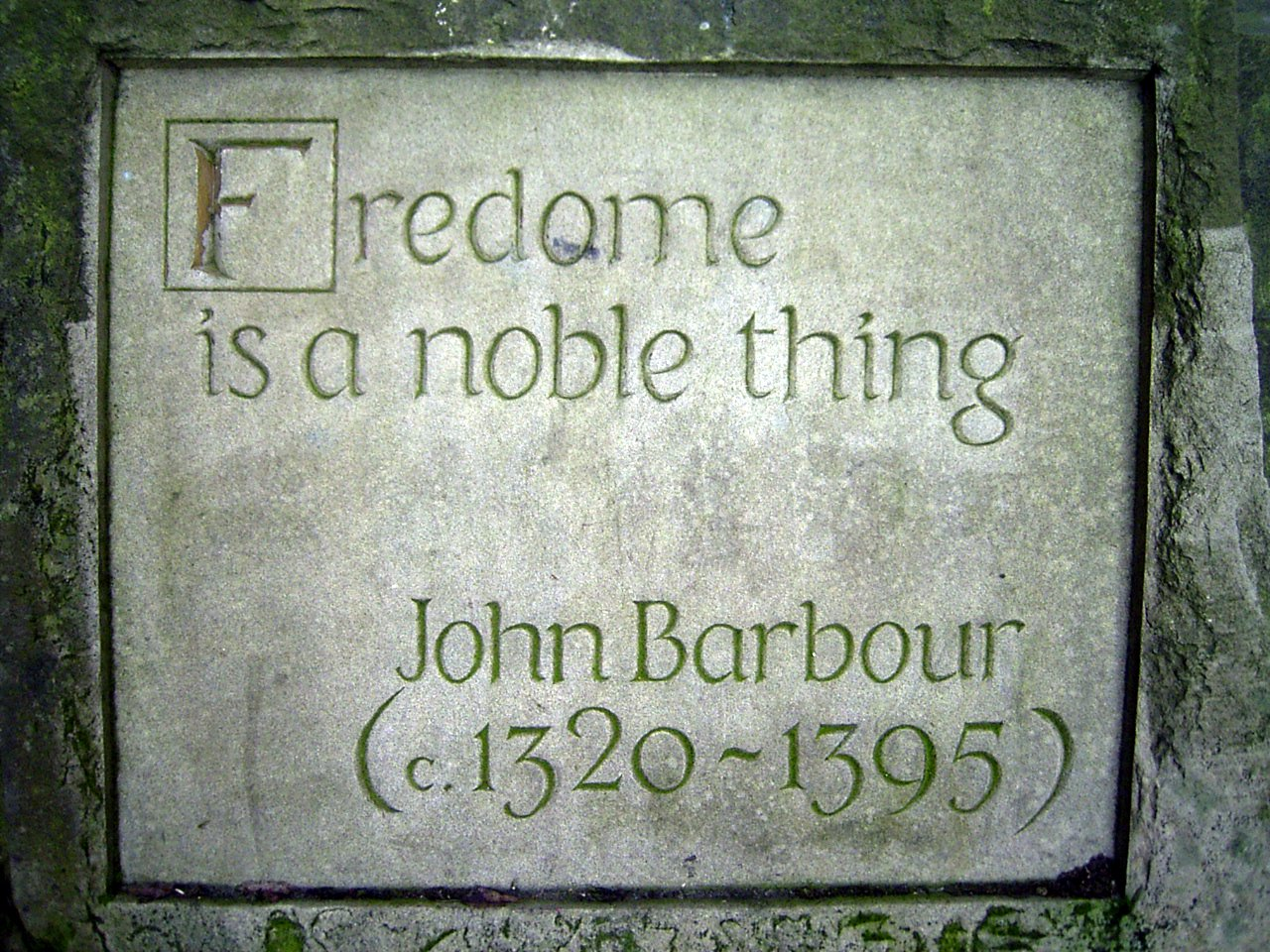
The sentiment underlying the poem.

The Brus, Barbour's major surviving work, is a long narrative poem written while he was a member of the king's household in the 1370s. Its subject is the ultimate success of the prosecution of the First War of Scottish Independence. Its principal focus is Robert the Bruce and Sir James Douglas, but the second half of the poem also features actions of Robert II's Stewart forebears in the conflict.

Barbour's purpose in the poem was partly historical and partly patriotic. He celebrates The Bruce (Robert I) and Douglas throughout as the flowers of Scottish chivalry. The poem opens with a description of the state of Scotland at the death of Alexander III (1286) and concludes (more or less) with the death of Douglas and the burial of the Bruce's heart (1332). Its central episode is the Battle of Bannockburn.

Patriotic as the sentiment is, this is expressed in more general terms than is found in later Scottish literature. In the poem, Robert I's character is a hero of the chivalric type common in contemporary romance, Freedom is a "noble thing" to be sought and won at all costs, and the opponents of such freedom are shown in the dark colours which history and poetic propriety require, but there is none of the complacency of the merely provincial habit of mind.

Barbour's style in the poem is vigorous, his line generally fluid and quick, and there are passages of high merit. The most quoted part is Book 1, lines 225-228:

A! fredome is a noble thing!
Fredome mayss man to haiff liking;
Fredome all solace to man giffis:
He levys at ess that frely levys!

=== Stewartis Oryginalle ===
One of Barbour's known lost works is The Stewartis Oryginalle which is described as having traced the genealogy of the Stewarts. The Stewart name replaced that of Bruce in the Scottish royal line when Robert II acceded to the throne after the death of David II, his uncle.

Robert II was Barbour's royal patron. It is not known how the work came to be lost.

=== Buik of Alexander ===
Attempts have been made to name Barbour as the author of the Buik of Alexander, a Scots translation of the Roman d'Alexandre and other associated pieces. This translation borrows much from The Brus. It survives and is known to us from the unique edition printed in Edinburgh, c. 1580, by Alexander Arbuthnot.

=== Legends of the Saints ===
Another possible work was added to Barbour's canon with the discovery in the library of the University of Cambridge, by Henry Bradshaw, of a long Scots poem of over 33,000 lines, dealing with Legends of the Saints, as told in the Legenda Aurea and other legendaries. The general likeness of this poem to Barbour's accepted work in verse-length, dialect and style, and the facts that the lives of English saints are excluded and those of St. Machar (the patron saint of Aberdeen) and St. Ninian are inserted, make this ascription plausible. Later criticism, though divided, has tended in the contrary direction, and has based its strongest negative judgment on the consideration of rhymes, assonance and vocabulary.

== Legacy ==
As "father" of Scots poetry, Barbour holds a place in the Scotland's literary tradition similar to the position often given to his contemporary Chaucer vis-à-vis the vernacular tradition in England. Different witnesses ascribe that he was the author of the five or six long works in Scots, which would make him one of the most voluminous writers of Early Scots, if not the most voluminous of all Scots poets. But his authorship of The Brus alone, as a tale of a struggle against tyranny, secures his place as a literary voice who broke new linguistic ground.

== See also ==
- Scottish literature
- Makar

Religious titles
Preceded by Alexander de Kininmund	Archdeacon of Aberdeen x 1357–1395	Succeeded by Henry de Lichton
