= John de Rait =

Scottish cleric

John de Rait [Raith, Rathe, Rate, Rathet] was a 14th-century Scottish cleric. The name "Rait" probably links him to the village of Rait in Gowrie, although the name "Rath" – Gaelic for a type of enclosed settlement – is common to many settlements in Scotland. Rait, at some unknown university, attained a Master's Degree in his youth; he was Archdeacon of Aberdeen between 1342 and 1350, and Precentor of Elgin Cathedral between 1349 and 1350. He resigned both positions in 1350 because in that year he became Bishop of Aberdeen. He held this position for five years, dying sometime before 9 June 1355 and was buried in the choir of Aberdeen Cathedral.

Religious titles
| Preceded by Alan de Moray | Archdeacon of Aberdeen; 1342–1350 | Succeeded by Alexander de Kininmund |
| Preceded by William de Deyn | Bishop of Aberdeen; 1350–1355 | Succeeded by Alexander de Kininmund |
