= Adam de Tyninghame =

14th-century cleric

Adam de Tyninghame was a 14th-century cleric and, as his name suggests, a probable native of Tyninghame in East Lothian.

== Biography ==
Adam appears in the records as rector of Falkirk (under Holyrood Abbey) from 1344, and by 1360 he was the secretary of William Douglas, 1st Earl of Douglas. In 1378, he was sent as one of four ambassadors sent to France for the Scottish king. He was Dean of the diocese of Aberdeen - briefly dean of Dunblane in 1361 - from 1362 until 1380, the year in which he was elected as Bishop of Aberdeen.

In 1382 Bishop Adam was engaged in a struggle with the husbandmen of "Fermartyne" (Formartine), who had not paid their second tithes, and Adam had to get an order from the Lieutenant of Scotland, John, Earl of Carrick, to enforce payment. Adam, however, did not enjoy a good relationship with Alexander Stewart, Earl of Buchan, who was the main warlord of the north and brother of Carrick. He continued his close relationship with the Douglases, his first patrons, and at different points in the 1380s can be found witnessing documents by Margaret, Countess of Mar, window of the first Earl of Douglas and mother to the second.

Adam died on 18 September 1389.

== Notes ==
Religious titles
Preceded by Alexander de Kininmund	Bishop of Aberdeen; 1380–1389	Succeeded by Gilbert de Greenlaw
