= Archdeacon of Aberdeen =

The Archdeacon of Aberdeen was the only archdeacon in the Diocese of Aberdeen, acting as a deputy of the Bishop of Aberdeen. The archdeacon held the parish church of Rayne as a prebend since 1256. The following is a list of known historical archdeacons:

== List of archdeacons of Aberdeen ==
- Máel Coluim, fl. 1172 x 1179
- Simon, fl. 1189 x 1203
- Omer, fl. x 1207-1208 x
- Máel Coluim, fl. 1224 x 1226-1250 x
- Geoffrey, fl. 1259–1281
- Alan de Moravia, x 1335-1341
- John de Rait, 1342-1350
- Alexander de Kininmund, x 1352-1355
- John Barbour, x 1357-1395
- Henry de Lichton, 1395 - 1396
- Thomas Trail, 1395
- John de Lichton, fl. 1395 x 1402
- David Falconer, x 1407–1411
- Thomas de Tyninghame, 1411–1439
- Walter Stewart, 1440
- Laurence Piot, 1440-1453 x 1454
- James Lindsay 1454–1456
- Laurence Piot (again), 1455-1465 x 1468
- James Inglis, 1468
- Alexander Rait, 1468-1475 x 1479
  - Robert Stewart, 1472–1474
- Andrew Young, 1479
  - George Brown, 1479
- Robert Blackadder, 1475 x 1479
  - James Lindsay, 1479–1495
- John Fraser, 1480–1488
- Gavin Vaiche, 1485 x 1486
- Gavin Dunbar, 1487
- Adam Elphinstone, 1490/1495 x 1499
- Robert Elphinstone, 1499–1508
  - William Dowy, 1499–1500
- Thomas Halkerston, 1508
- Thomas Myrton, 1512–1540
- Patrick Myrton (senior), 1530–1551
- John Stewart, 1551–1563
- James Erskine, 1565–1579
- Robert Murray, 1584–1585
- Walter Abercrombie, 1586–1620
  - Walter Richardson, 1586
- Andrew Logie, 1624–1636

== Bibliography ==
- Watt, D.E.R., Fasti Ecclesiae Scotinanae Medii Aevi ad annum 1638, 2nd Draft, (St Andrews, 1969), pp. 18–21

== See also ==
- Bishop of Aberdeen
