= Treaty of Corbeil (1326) =

1326 treaty between France and Scotland

- Formation: 26 April 1326
- Founded at: Corbeil
- Purpose: Defense pact
- Members: Kingdom of Scotland; Kingdom of France

The Treaty of Corbeil (26 April 1326) renewed the Auld Alliance between France and Scotland. It confirmed the obligation of each state to join the other in declaring war if either was attacked by England. The deputation (delegation) from Scotland (then under the rule of King Robert the Bruce) was led by Thomas Randolph, 1st Earl of Moray while France was ruled then by Charles IV.

== See also ==
- List of treaties
