= Diocese of Aberdeen =

Diocese in Scotland (11th or 12th century – 1689)

Coordinates: 57°10′N 2°6′W

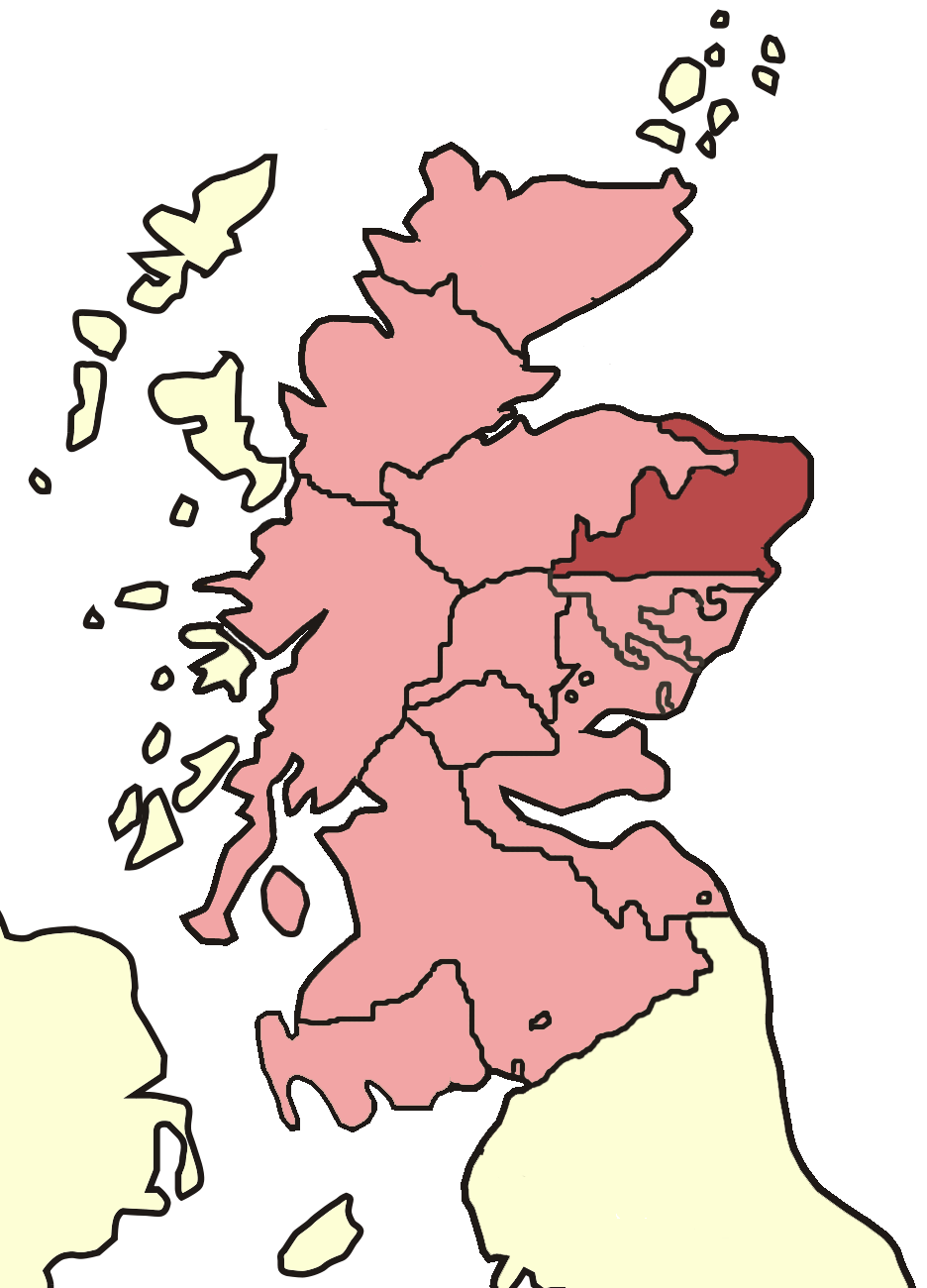
- Head: Bishop of Aberdeen
- Archdeacon(s): Archdeacon of Aberdeen
- Known rural deans: Aberdeen, Boyne, Buchan, Garioch, Mar
- First attestation: 1131 x 1132
- Metropolitan before 1472: None
- Metropolitan after 1492: Archbishop of St Andrews
- Cathedral: St Machar's Cathedral
- Dedication: St Machar
- Native dedication: Saint Machar
- Canons: Secular
- Catholic successor: Resurrected 4 March 1878 (see Roman Catholic Diocese of Aberdeen)
- Episcopal successor: Diocese of Aberdeen and Orkney

The Diocese of Aberdeen was originally believed to be the direct continuation of an 11th-century bishopric at Mortlach in present-day Moray. However, this early date and the first bishops were based on a misinterpretation and reliance on the early charters found in the cartulary of Aberdeen Cathedral. These charters are now known to be false. The first recorded bishop of the diocese was Nectan, mentioned in the Book of Deer around 1132. The earliest direct written evidence of a bishop in Aberdeen appears in a papal bull addressed to Bishop Edward in 1157. This bull acknowledged the existence of his cathedral, discussed the formation of a chapter, and marked the beginning of the diocesan expansion.

The parochial system in Scotland had been developing since the early Middle Ages and saw significant progress under David I. He clarified the rights of the local church in terms of territory and jurisdiction. His reforms ensured that parishioners could support their priests by providing tiends, while local lords retained their rights to build churches and appoint priests. Over time, the lords’ patronage shifted to cathedrals and monasteries, enriching these institutions at the expense of the parishes. The cathedral, with its expanding number of canonries, used the appropriated income to sustain itself. The beneficiary canons had a duty to ensure an income for the parish vicars although the stipends were generally meagre.

Reconstruction of the cathedral began in the late 14th century and extended into the 16th century.

== History of the diocese ==
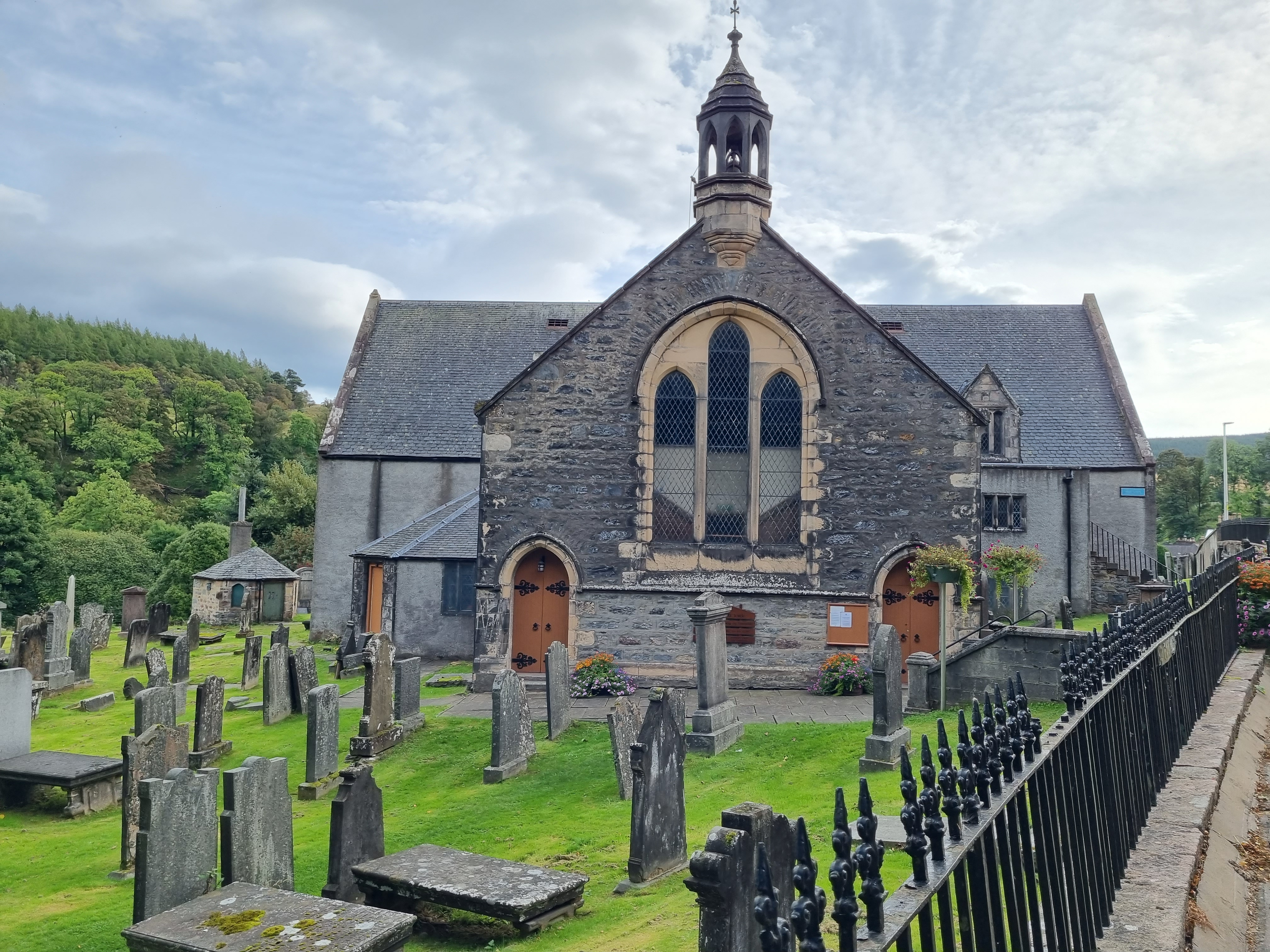
Mortlach Parish Church

The diocese’s likely mythic origins are recorded in the cathedral’s chartulary, associating its early bishops—Bean, Denortius, Cormac, and Nectan—with Mortlach in present‑day Moray. This tradition rests on a series of early charters that are acknowledged to be false. These charters allowed Hector Boece to construct a history that had successive Mortlach bishops, culminating with its fourth prelate, Nectan, who would then move his see to Aberdeen. Beyond his appearance in one of these spurious charters, Nectan is only once documented as bishop of Aberdeen—in a small note (c. 1132) found in the Book of Deer. Nevertheless, Mortlach did possess early ecclesiastical significance. A Papal Bull of 1157 by Pope Adrian IV confirmed the existence of a monasterium at Mortlach along with five attendant churches as part of the diocese of Aberdeen. By the 11th century, this type of organisation was characteristic of Culdee (Céli Dé) settlements—the Culdees resembled communities of secular priests ministering to local populations but directed from the central mother church (the monasterium).

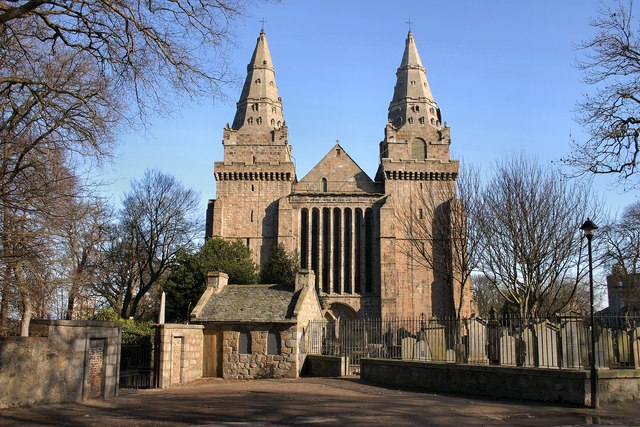
St Machar's Cathedral, Aberdeen

Pope Adrian IV's bull of 1157 also confirmed to Bishop Edward the churches of Aberdeen, St Machar and St Nicholas, together with the town of Old Aberdeen and other lands. The bull authorised bishop Edward to establish a chapter in his cathedral, giving him the choice of introducing regular or secular canons as his clergy, but nothing immediately came of this. The lack of a means of funding a fully functioning unit of clerics may have accounted for this. Reforms in the 12th century were partially driven by local landowners who provided churches and priests, leading to a diminished importance of mother churches. The strongest stimulus for change happened under the influence of King David I. He introduced an ordinance that guaranteed the rights of the parochial churches and their priests who were to be sustained by the collection of teinds. Consequently, and particularly in areas of extensive feudal expansion by Anglo-Norman lords (such as in the diocese of Aberdeen), geographically based and viable parochial entities emerged within the diocese. These local lords—with some regard for the afterlife—granted their right of patronage over parish churches to the cathedral or a monastery of their choosing. This, combined with the establishment of new monasteries, considerably impacted the Culdee mother churches and pendicle churches. Some were reduced to ordinary parish churches, such as Mortlach and Cabrach, while others, more rarely, were transformed into organisations that more closely resembled their former existence. For instance, Monymusk became a house of Augustinian canons regular.

The mechanism by which the diocese could generate income was now in place: parish churches, with their guaranteed income, would soon be subjected to appropriation by the monasteries and cathedrals. At Aberdeen, the annexation process may have begun as early as Bishop Edward's tenure and increased in line with the development of the chapter. The enlargement was slow with incremental appointments of dignitaries continuing through to the mid-13th century when in 1249 Pope Innocent IV issued a bull to Bishop Peter Ramsay confirming the diocese constitution and a chapter consisting of five dignitaries and eight ordinary canonries all sustained on prebends.

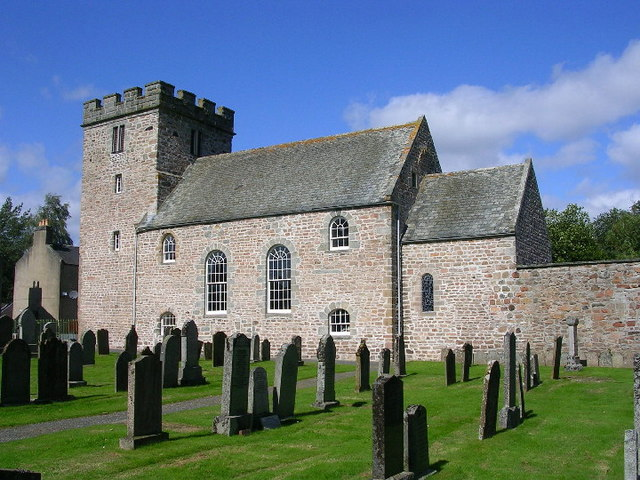
Parish church of Monymusk incorporating elements of the Augustinian priory

Appropriation of parish incomes to prebendary canons in the cathedral weakened the parish churches. The cathedral canons, possessed of the fruits of both the parsonages and the vicarages, were responsible for appointing vicars to the parishes. Invariably, vicars were paid meagre pensions and lacked security of tenure. This resulted in inadequately educated clerics being appointed to discharge the cure of souls.

By 1488, the cathedral chapter had expanded to twenty-nine canons supported by the income from fifty-four parish churches; of those, forty-two were prebendal, one mensal and eleven held in common. Additionally, forty-two other parish churches were appropriated to monasteries and other ecclesiastical foundations, leaving only four parishes—Cushnie, Forvie, Tough, and Tyrie—as independent entities. The diocese also included eleven hospitals/almshouses for the poor, aged, or infirm parishioners. The religious Orders were also well represented: a Tironensian priory at Fyvie, a priory of Augustinian canons at Monymusk, and a Cistercian monastery at Deer. Similarly, the Carmelite, Dominican, Franciscan, and Trinitarian Friars all had houses in Aberdeen itself.

The reconstruction of the cathedral began when Bishop Alexander Kininmund (1355–80), probably nearing the end of his episcopacy, heightened the walls of the west towers and the nave. Bishop Henry Lichton (1422–40) completed what Kininmund had started and established the north transept, but left the construction of the central tower incomplete. He was followed by Ingram Lindsay (1441–58), who roofed and paved the nave. Thomas Spens (1457–80) finely furnished the interior, and Bishop William Elphinstone completed the central tower begun by Lichton. Elphinstone also commenced the rebuilding of a larger choir. Gavin Dunbar (1518–32) completed the south transept and provided spires for the west towers. Dunbar was also responsible for the armorial-adorned ceiling in the nave, displaying the coat of arms of the pontiff, Scottish prelates, and leading European rulers. (Note: Following the Reformation, the nave was kept for religious service and was re-roofed in 1607 and again in the 1640s. The central tower collapsed in 1688 and demolished the transepts almost entirely)

== Religious houses ==
The bishop held authority over the cathedral, parish churches, and hospitals. While the monasteries were largely independent of the episcopacy they still required the bishop if any of the brothers needed to be ordained to the priesthood. The monastic houses may occasionally receive patronage from the bishop and chapter.

=== The cathedral ===
==== Bishops ====
- Nectan, fl. 1131/2
- Edward, fl 1147/51-1171
- Matthew, 1172–1199
- John, 1199–1207
- Adam de Kalder, 1207–1228
- Matthew Scot, postulated 1228
- Gilbert de Stirling, 1228–39
- Radulf de Lambley, 1239–47
- Peter de Ramsey, 1247–56
- Richard de Potton, 1256–70 or 1272
- Hugh de Benin, 1272–82
- Henry le Chen, 1282–1328
- Walter Herok, elect and provided but not consecrated, 1329
- Alexander de Kyninmund (I), 1329–1344
- William de Deyn, 1344–1350
- John Rait, 1350-1354/5
- Alexander de Kyninmund (II), 1355–80
- Simon de Ketenis, elected 1380 but not provided
- Adam de Tynyngham, 1380-9
- Gilbert de Greenlaw, 1390–1421
- Henry de Lychton, 1422–1440 translated from Moray
- Ingram Lindsay, 1441–58
- Thomas Spens, 1457–80 translated from Galloway
- Robert Blackadder, 1480–83
- William Elphinstone, 1483–1514 translated from Ross
- Alexander Gordon, 1514/15-18
- Robert Forman, before 1515–16
- Gavin Dunbar, 1518–32
- George Learmond, 1529–31
- William Stewart, 1532–45
- William Gordon, 1545–77

==== Cathedral chapter ====
The development of Aberdeen's chapter was lengthy, even though the papal bull of 1157 authorised Bishop Edward to institute a chapter of secular or monastic clerics. The first signs of chapter enlargement became apparent when a cleric designated as a 'canon' witnessed an act by Bishop John (1199–1207). His successor, Bishop Kalder (1207–1228), had many canons serving on synodal sittings who confirmed his episcopal edicts, with an archdeacon as the senior cleric. Bishop Stirling (1228–1239) continued this system, but the assembly was now called a 'chapter' and possessed its own seal. A canon was now designated 'treasurer' with the dean still subordinate to the archdeacon. By 1239, Bishop Lamley had been elected at a meeting chaired by the dean, although apparently, the archdeacon was still his senior. In c. 1239, a canon had been elevated to the dignity of precentor, and then in 1240, a chancellor was visible. In 1243, a meeting of the chapter demonstrated a change in its structure; the dean was now the senior canon. By 1445, the chapter consisted of twenty-nine canons; the dean, presenter, chancellor, and treasurer were the dignitaries (the archdeacon was no longer a dignitary), and 24 simple canonries made up the remainder. The last canonry to be created was that of the sub-chanter (1527x1534), bringing the total number of canons to 30. Between them, the chapter held 46 appropriated churches in the diocese of Aberdeen and a further 2 in the diocese of Moray.

Under Aberdeen Cathedral's constitution, the bishop chose the entire chapter with one exception, the dean (decanus). The dean was elected to his position by the chapter after taking the solemn oath of fidelity and to uphold the rights, customs and liberties of the cathedral. He was then installed in the choir and provided with his place in the chapter by the bishop. Canons took an oath of fidelity and obedience to the bishop and the chapter. The chapter's leader was the dean who held total control over all who resided in the cathedral's environs; this extended not only to the canons but also to the lesser ecclesiastics and servants. Next in importance was the precentor, usually referred to as the chanter (cantor). His responsibilities were to oversee the provision of music used in the church services, choose the choirboys, see to their education, and employ a suitable song-school tutor. Next in seniority was the chancellor (cancellarius), whose responsibilities included drafting the chapter's correspondence and charters, communicating to the chapter the contents of incoming letters and instructions, and looking after the chapter's library. He also presided over the town's grammar school and selected its teacher. The fourth and last dignity was the treasurer (thesaurarius), who oversaw the church's treasury. This included items such as gold and silver, drinking cups and expensive apparel. He needed to ensure that the church was adequately supplied with everyday items such as candles, tapers, incense, charcoal, bread and wine for the services, and also mundane things such as mats and bullrushes for floor coverings.

==== Deaneries ====
A Deanery, sometimes known as an archdeaconry, is a geographical administrative subdivision within a diocese containing the parish churches. The archdeacon was responsible for the deanery administration, its parishes, parish churches, chapels and clergy. He was assisted in this by the appointed dean of Christianity (later called rural dean), who was also one of the parochial clergy. His role was to visit each of his churches annually to inspect the internal and external fabric of the building and the propriety of its clerics. In the Aberdeen diocese, there were five deaneries—Aberdeen, Boyne, Buchan, Garioch and Mar.

=== Parish churches ===
The expression parochia changed over time from its original 12th-century meaning as the territory over which a bishop had authority (Note: In the 12th century, the area over which the bishop had authority did not always mean diocese. For example, Cumbria was subject to the jurisdiction of the bishop of Glasgow—parochia Cumbrensis—although it was not part of the diocese (c. 1120).)to its later definition of a locality subject to the ecclesiastic charge of a baptismal church. This shift was complete by the 13th century when parochia and parochia ecclesia became entirely associated with the parish church. The development of the parochial system in Scotland has been attributed to the reforming zeal of King David I and his introduction of Anglo-Norman lords, yet it is also true that the process had begun under David's predecessors and the native Scottish aristocracy. Some parochial-type entities that had formed before David's reign remained unaltered under David's reshaping of the ecclesiastical landscape. Importantly, David played a significant role in institutionalising the sustainability of the parish unit. The canonical statutes specified the conditions for parish churches. A church built from new had to be made of stone, glazed and erected and funded by the parishioners, while the chancel's construction had to be at the rector's expense. The church had to be consecrated, although it appears that this was frequently overlooked. Again, at his own expense, the rector had to equip the church with furniture, a silver chalice, necessary books, altar coverings and candles. These objects were now the property of the church and had to be left in good condition for the succeeding clergy. Failure to supply these items resulted in the suspension of benefices until compliance.

Parish churches were a fundamental resource for large ecclesial establishments such as abbeys and cathedrals. This was achieved by the appropriation of church revenues to the detriment of the resident rectors, also called parsons. The negative impact of these appropriations led to the parsonage largely being confined to the few independent parishes. The bishop always had to sanction appropriations within his diocese, and the recipient of the appropriated parish assumed the obligations and revenues of the parsonage. To ensure that the needs of the parishioners were properly met, the beneficiary needed to establish a vicarage-perpetual. This type of vicar held the rights to some of the fruits of the parish. Despite this, it became normal for these vicarage settlements to be formally part of the appropriation process, with the cure of souls provided either by a stipendiary pensioner vicar or a parochial chaplain. These lowly clergymen were usually poorly paid and often uneducated.

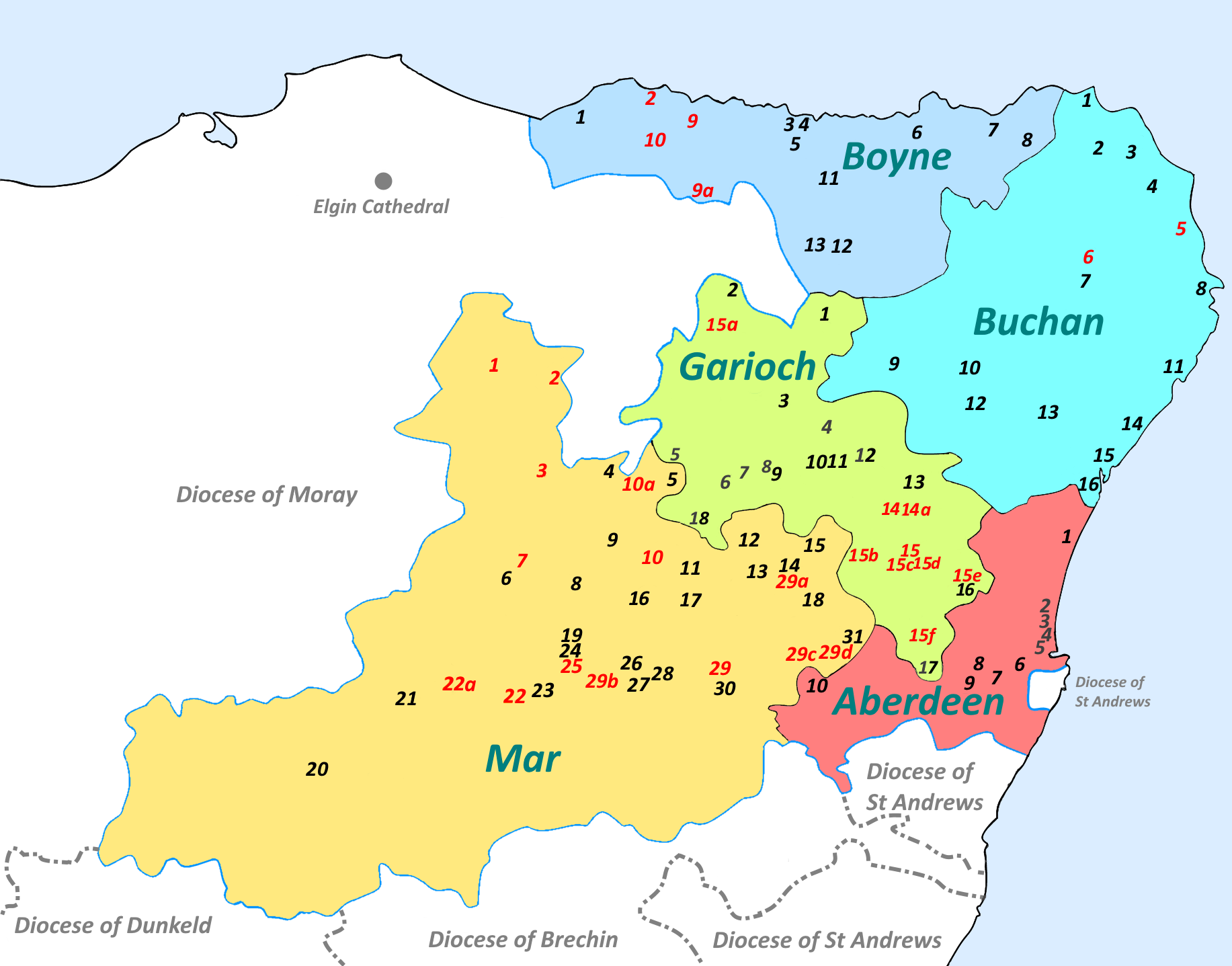
Parishes of Diocese of Aberdeen by Deanery (see tables, below) parish churches marked in red indicate former chapels of a mother church that achieved parochial status, e.g. Mar, 1 & 2 or, parish churches with their retained pendicle chapels e.g. Garioch, 14 & 14a

Aberdeen
Parish	Map reference
Aberdeen–St Machar	2
Aberdeen–St Nicholas	5
Aberdeen–Snow	4
Aberdeen–Spittal	3
Banchory–Devenick	6
Banchory–Ternan	10
Belhelvie	1
Culter	8
Dalmayock	9
Maryculter	7
Peterculter	8

Boyne
Parish	Map reference
Aberdour	7
Alvah	5
Banff	4
Cullen	2
Deskford	10
Fordyce	9
Forglen	13
Gamrie	6
Inverboyndie	3
Kinedward	11
Ordiquhill	9a
Rathven	1
Turriff	12
Tyrie	8

Buchan
Parish	Map reference
Bethelnay	16
Crimond	4
Cruden	11
Deer	7
Ellon	13
Fetterangus	6
Forvie	15
Foveran	18
Fyvie	9
Inverugie	5
Logie-Buchan	17
Lonmay	3
Methlick	10
Peterugie	8
Philorth	1
Rathen	2
Slains	14
Tarves	12

Garioch
Parish	Map reference
Auchterless	1
Bourtie	13
Culsalmond	3
Dalmayock	17
Daviot	12
Drumblade	15a
Dyce	15e
Fintray	16
Forgue	2
Insch	8
Inverurie	14
Kemnay	15b
Kinnellar	15d
Kinkell	15
Kinnethmont	5
Kintore	15c
Leslie	6
Logie-Durno	11
Monkegie	14a
Oyne	10
Premnay	9
Rathmuriel	7
Rayne	4
Skene	15f
Tullynestle	18

Mar
Parish	Map reference
Abergerny	22a
Aboyne	28
Alford	11
Auchindoir	4
Birse	30
Cabrach	3
Colstone	24
Clatt	5
Cluny	29a
Coul	27
Crathie	21
Cushnie	16
Dalmeath	2
Echt	31
Fetterneir	15
Forbes	10
Glenbuchat	7
Glenmuick	22
Glentannar	29b
Inverochtie	6
Keig	12
Kearn	10a
Kildrummy	9
Kinbathoch	8
Kincardine O’Neil	29
Kindrocht	20
Kinerny	18
Leochel	17
Logie-Mar	25
Lumphanan	29d
Midmar	29c
Migvie	19
Monymusk	14
Mortlach	1
Tarland	26
Tough	13
Tullich	23

=== Hospitals ===
Although many hospitals were dependent on monasteries, those within the Aberdeen diocese operated as secular establishments under the bishop's jurisdiction. The benevolent founders of these hospitals imposed specific conditions on their altruism; recipients of care were obligated to offer prayers for the souls of their patron(s) who believed that as a result, they would receive a diminution of their time spent in purgatory. These hospitals adhered to stringent codes of behaviour and, despite being secular in nature, followed the principles of a monastic rule, often that of St. Augustine.

Within the diocese of Aberdeen, a total of eleven hospitals were established. Among these, five were situated in Aberdeen—three in the ecclesiastical burgh of Old Aberdeen, and two in the royal burgh of New Aberdeen in the harbour area. These hospitals served various purposes, specifically, care of:

- lepers – 3,
- the sick (non-leper) – 1
- the sick (non-leper) and the poor – 1
- the elderly – 1
- purpose unknown – 1

The Fourth Lateran Council of 1215 prohibited clerics and infirmarers from practising surgery if it included blood-letting, but herbal therapies would have likely been available for the use of inmates. There is very little evidence that doctors attended to the needs of inmates; the emphasis was more on the welfare of the soul than the body. Most hospitals in Scotland were small in terms of inmates, and only in a minority of cases did they house more than 20 residents. The last hospital to be built in the diocese of Aberdeen was the almshouse dedicated to St Mary, and founded by Bishop Gavin Dunbar in 1532 and had room for only 12 old men.

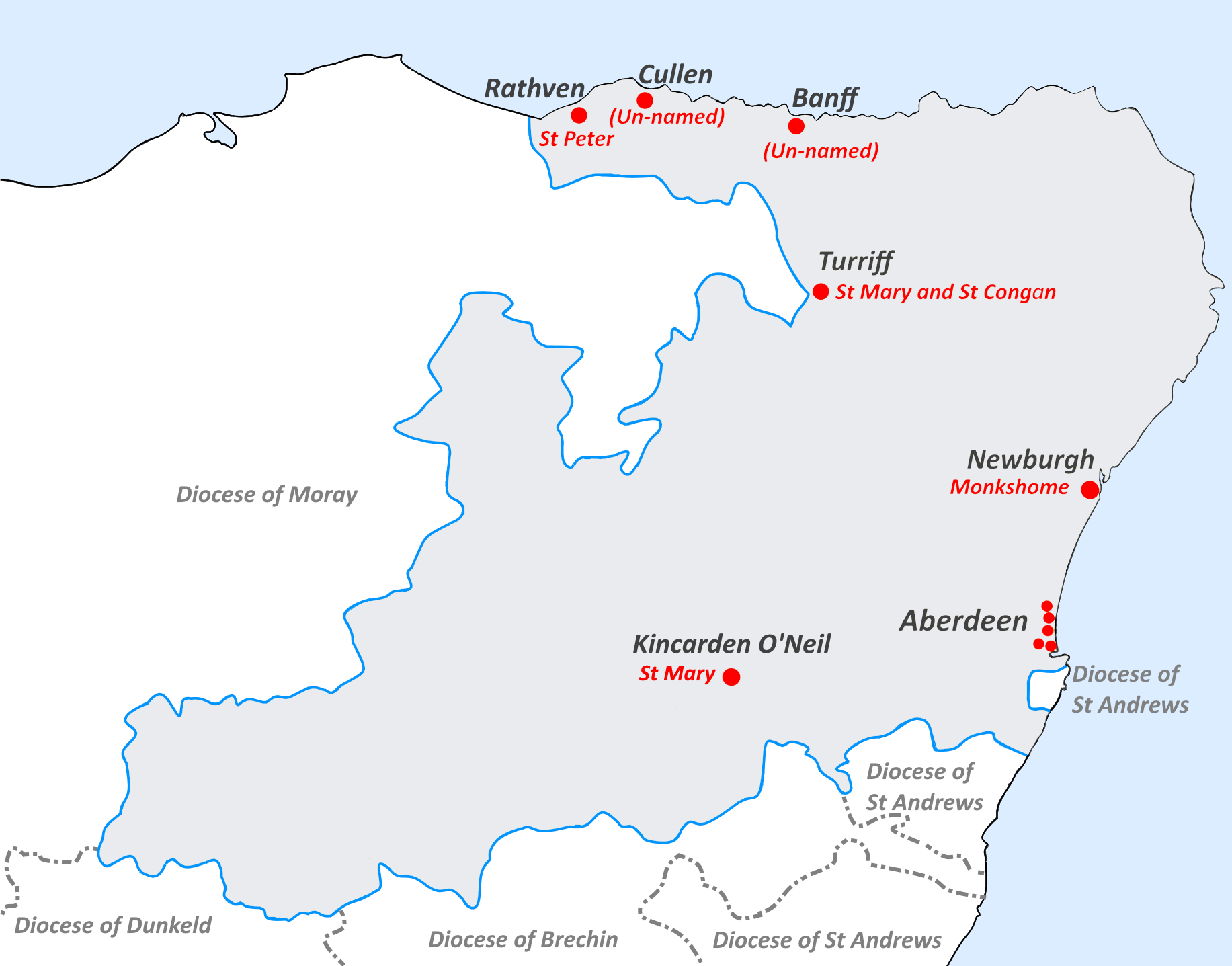
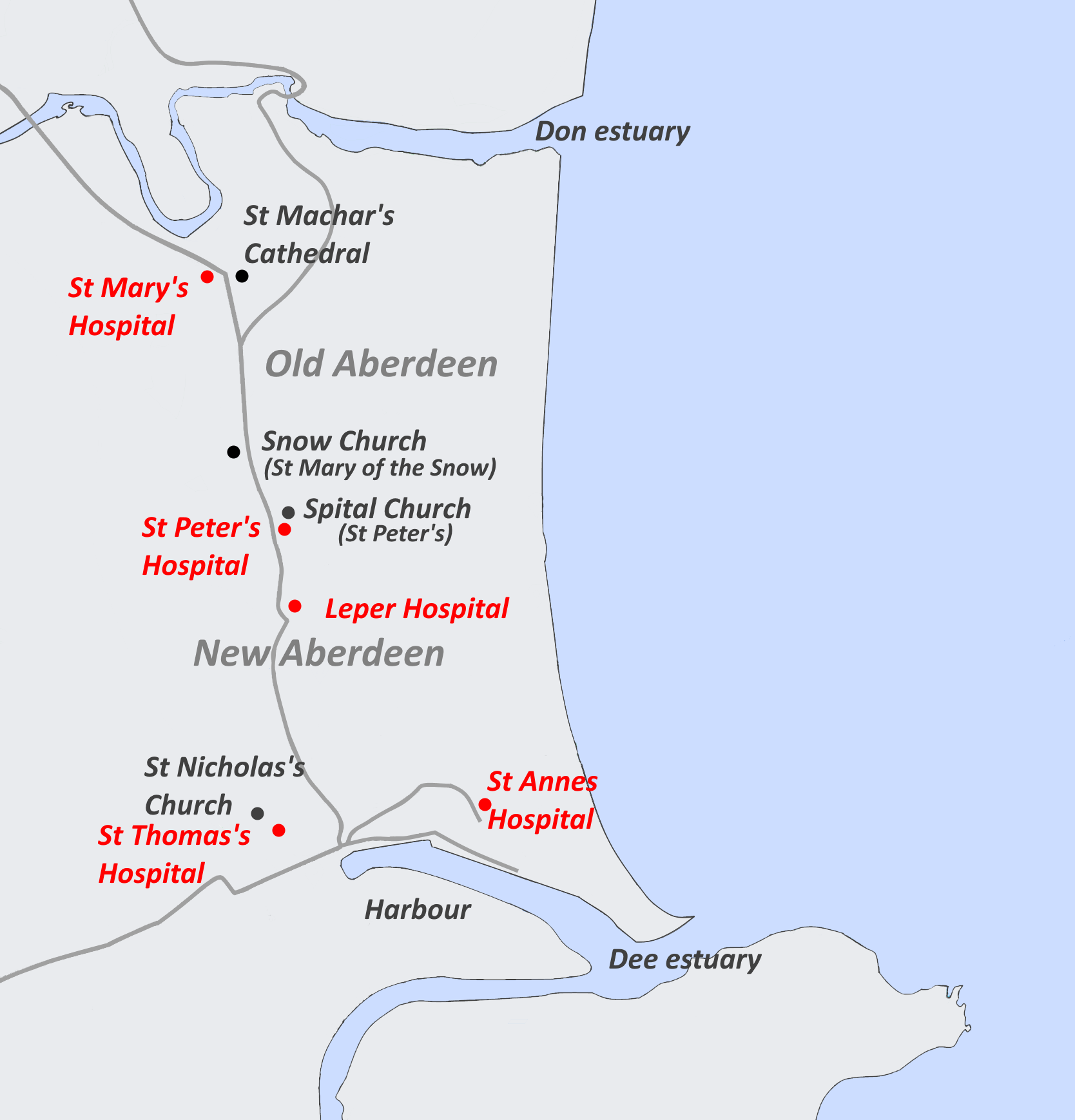
Hospitals in the Diocese of Aberdeen

Location	Name	Category	Founded	Closed	Notes
Aberdeen	Aberdeen (Unnamed)	Leperhouse	bef. 1333	1574x1661	For female and male lepers. The Regent ordered the burgh council to collect rents on lands owned by the hospital to allow repairs to the building and roof, on 18 August 1574. By 1661, the house was ruinous and the lands were sold to King's College in 1718
Aberdeen	St Anne	Almshouse; For the poor	Before 1519	c. 1550	For poor women, situated at Footdee. Chapel added in 1519. Also, land owned by the house was referred to in the mid-16th century.
Aberdeen	St Mary	Almshouse; For the elderly	23 February 1532	After 1786	Founded by Bishop Gavin Dunbar for 12 old men. Mention of the appointment of a master of the house 18 May 1573. Still in existence in 18th century.
Aberdeen	St Peter	Almshouse; For the sick	Before 1179	After 1541	Founded by Bishop Mathew (1172–99) for 'infirm bretheren'—in 1256 mention of the 'sisters living therein' is made. In 1427, the house is partially suppressed by Bishop Hendry due to malpractice by its masters. The inhabitants were still being cared for in 1541
Aberdeen	St Thomas the Martyr	Almshouse; For the poor and the sick	28 May 1459	After 1660	For the poor and infirm, with a master. Recorded that the bedesmen received payment in 1596-7 and that two inmates were admonished in 1606
Banff	Banff (Unnamed)	Leperhouse	Before 1544	Before 1590	Located near the vicar's glebe and the Carmelite monastery. It was already closed by 2 March 1590
Cullen	Cullen (Unnamed)	Almshouse; Purpose unknown	before 1543	undated	Mentioned in the foundation charter of the collegiate church of St Mary (1543). An unidentified bedehouse is noted in 1611 which may have been pre-Reformation in origin. Other bedehouses recorded are all post-reformation
Kincardine O'Neil	St Mary	Almshouse; For the poor	Before 1231 (confirmed 1234)	Before 1330	Founded by Thomas Durward and confirmed by his son Alan Durward on 3 March 1234
Newburgh	Monkshome	Almshouse; For the poor	c.1261		Founded by Alexander Comyn, Earl of Buchan for six poor men, with a chaplain. Monks from the Abbey of Deer stayed there
Rathven	St Peter	Leperhouse	1224-6	In one form or another to 1859	Founded by John Byseth (Bisset) for 7 lepers, with a chaplain and a servant. Became a prebend of Aberdeen Cathedral in 1445. Despite this, three bedesmen were still supported. In 1536, three prebends were restored to the hospital allowing it to refurbish the building to its original condition. The hospital continued even though its vicarage was appropriated to Cullen Collegiate Church in 1543. The hospital survived the Reformation and changed its use to the care of the poor and continued through until the 19th century when its last bedesman died in 1859
Turriff	St Mary and St Congan	Almshouse; For the poor	1273	?1412	Founded by Alexander Comyn, Earl of Buchan, 6 February 1273 and staffed by a master and 6 chaplains. The care was for 13 poor people. Following the extinction of the Comyn line of earls, the earldom fell to John Stewart who allowed the hospital with its income to become a prebend of Aberdeen Cathedral in 1412. No arrangement was made for the hospital's furtherance and may by that time have already closed.

=== Monasteries ===
During the late Middle Ages, the bishop was given powers of visitation and correction over the religious houses within his jurisdiction. Despite this, some monastic orders sought and were granted exemption from diocesan audits while others submitted themselves to the bishop's scrutiny. In the Aberdeen diocese, since the Cistercians, Templars, Hospitallers and all of the Friar orders were exempt, the bishop's visitation would have only applied to the houses at Monymusk and Fyvie. The bishop also interacted with monasteries in other limited ways. Generally, monks were not clerics but laymen so for a monastic community to function, it needed the bishop to ordain enough of its numbers into holy orders to provide for its liturgical and sacramental needs. Only the bishop could consecrate monastery churches and chapels and bless the altars with the necessary ecclesiastical utensils. Also since many parish churches in the diocese were annexed to monasteries these appropriations had to be confirmed by the bishop who then needed to ensure that the monasteries continued to provide adequate vicarage provision for the cure of souls.

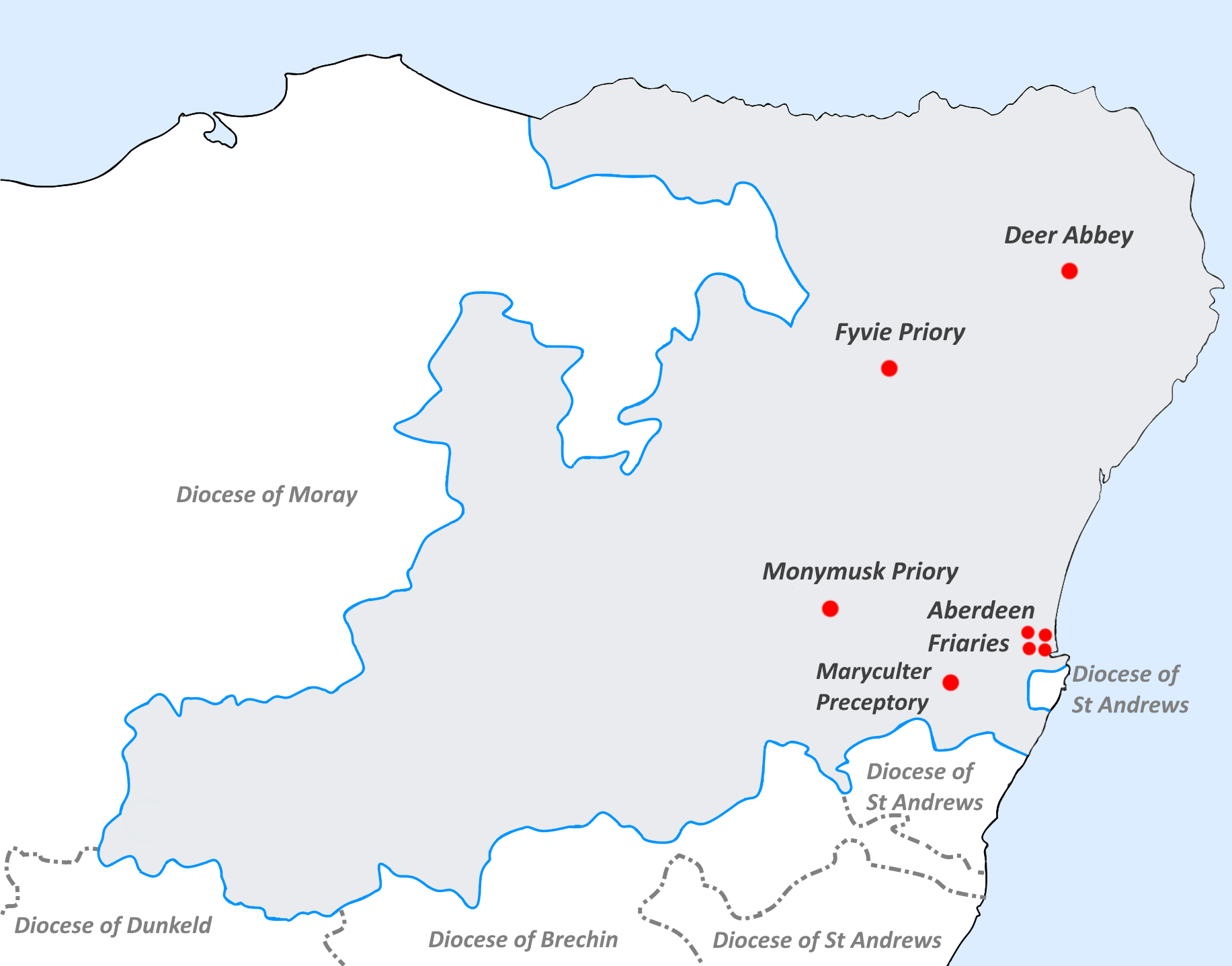
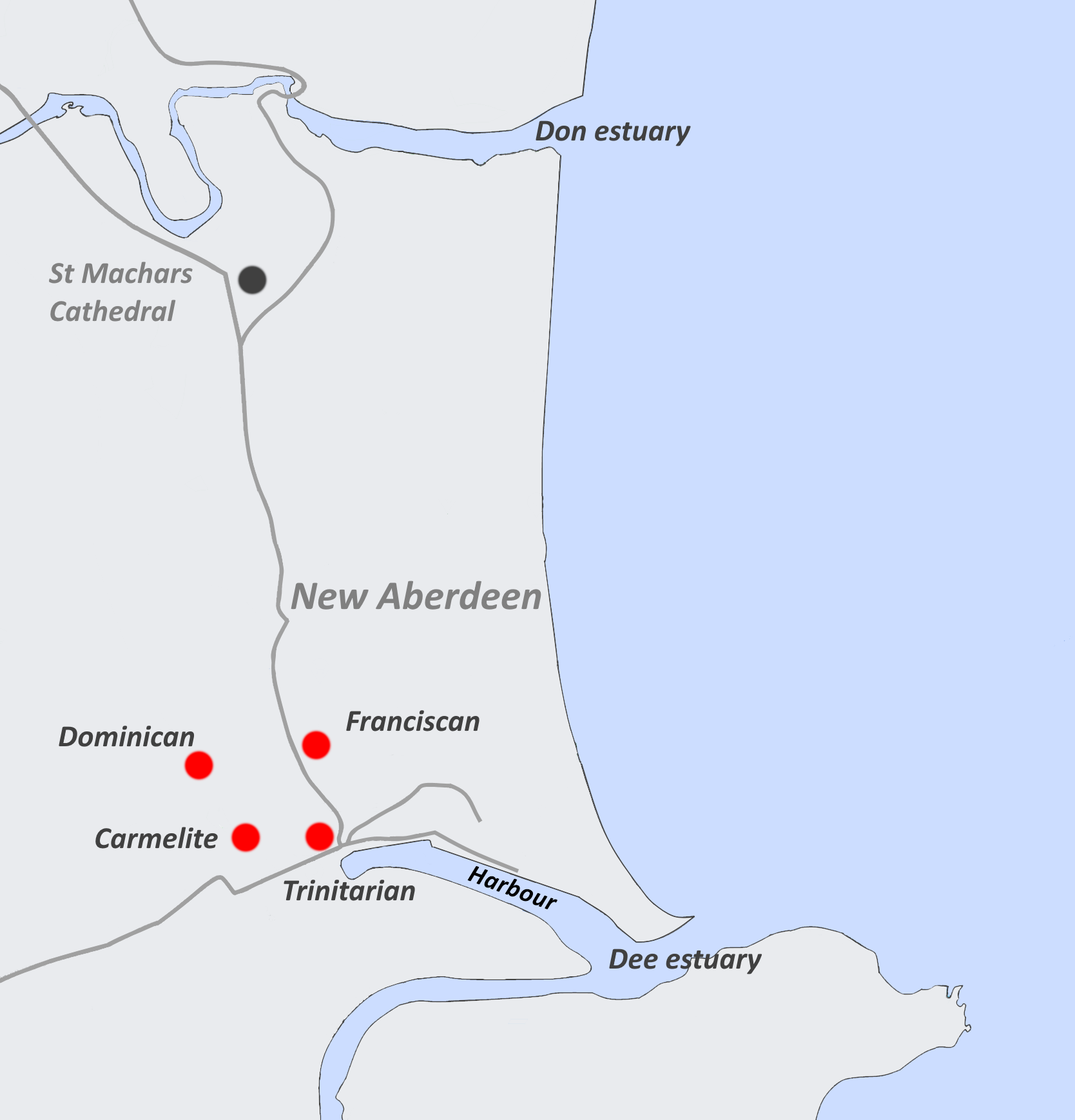
Monasteries within the Diocese of Aberdeen

Location	Category	Order	Founded	Secularised / Suppressed	Notes|-
Aberdeen	Priory	Carmelite	c. 1273	1560–83	Known as the White Friars. A mendicant order relying on charity for funding
Aberdeen	Priory	Dominican	1230–49	1560–87	Known as the Black Friars. A mendicant order relying on charity for funding
Aberdeen	Priory	Franciscan (Observants)	1469	1559	Known as the Grey Friars. A mendicant order relying on charity for funding
Aberdeen	Priory	Trinitarian	Before 1274	Before 1561	Known as the Red Friars. These were not a mendicant order in that they were allowed to accept endowments
Deer	Abbey	Cistercian	1219	1587	A Gaelic 12th century tradition gives Deer as an early monastic settlement and although grants of lands were being provided to an existing religious community from around 1000 to 1150, it is likely that this was a community of secular priests. A daughter house of Kinloss, it was founded by William Comyn, Earl of Buchan in 1219 but monks may have been present before that. The last monk-abbot, John Innes, resigned on 2 May 1543 and Robert Keith, brother of William Keith, Earl Marischal became the commendator-abbot at his provision on 11 May 1544. Following his death on 12 June 1551 his nephew, also Robert Keith received the commandatorship at his provision on 15 October 1552. The secularisation has complete when Keith, now Lord Altrie, received the abbey and properties at its erection into a temporal lordship in 1587
Fyvie	Priory	Tironensian	in or before 1285	unknown	Founded by Reginald le Chen. On 18 October 1285, his brother Bishop Henry le Chen confirmed the grant of the lands of Ardlogy to the abbey of Arbroath and the monks of that monastery already 'dwelling in the religious house built in the land of Ardlogie'. In 1325, the abbot of Arbroath called on the prior to ensure compliance with monastic regulation, and in 1451 a papal letter characterises the house as 'non-conventual'. Arbroath Abbey finally took back control of the priory when Pope Julius II reannexed the priory to the abbey on 14 February 1507
Maryculter	Preceptory	(1) Knights Templar (2) Knights Hospitallers	(1) Founded by Walter Byset, 1221–36 (2) Following the suppression of the Knights Templar, c. 1309, the house came to the Knights Hospitallers	(1) Suppressed 1309 (2) annexed to the Hospitaller's Commandery of Torphichen, 1513	For the dispute between Kelso Abbey and the Knights Templar, see Aberdeen Deanery, Parishes of Maryculter and Peterculter, above
Monymusk	Priory	Augustinian canons	before 1245	1617	The community of Céli Dé, also referred to as Culdees, received grants of lands and revenue during the 12th century. Gilchrist, Earl of Mar (d. 1203) established the monastery at Monymusk towards the end of the 12th century. Before 19 May 1245 the clerics had transformed themselves into canons regular when Pope Innocent IV referred to them as the 'prior and convent of Monymusk of the order of St Augustine'. After this, almost nothing further is known regarding the monastery until the mid-16th century when the building is described as 'ruinous'. In 1549–50, its occupants were a prior and 4 canons and the last recorded surviving member was on 13 August 1534. On the death of the last pre-Reformation prior, John Elphinstone, on 2 May 1543, the crown gifted the priory to the post-Reformation parson of Monymusk, John Hay in March 1562. After Hay's death, the commendatorship was provided to Alexander Forbes in August 1574. The control of the priory remained with the Forbes family until 1617 when it was annexed to the diocese of Dunblane

== Sources ==
- "Search Canmore". Canmore: Part of Historic Environment Scotland.
- Cowan, Ian B. (1961). "The Development of the Parochial System in Medieval Scotland" (PDF). The Scottish Historical Review. 40 (129): 43–55. JSTOR 25526631. "2022-07-14"
- Cowan, Ian B. (1972). "The medieval Church in the diocese of Aberdeen". Northern Scotland. 1 (First Series) (1). Edinburgh University Press: 19–48. doi:10.3366/nor.1972.0004. ISSN 0306-5278.
- Cowan, Ian B. (1967). The Parishes of Medieval Scotland. Edinburgh: Scottish Record Society, Vol. 93.
- Cowan, Ian B.; Eason, David E. (1976). Medieval Religious Houses of Scotland (2 ed.). London: Longman Group Limited. ISBN 0582120691.
- "Deskford Church: Statement of Significance" (PDF). Historic Environment Scotland. 2019.
- Dowden, John (1912). The Bishops of Scotland. James Maclehose & Sons.
- Dowden, John (1910). The Medieval Church in Scotland. Glasgow: Maclehose.
- Dowden, John (1910). "The Parish Church and its Privileges during the Medieval Period". The Scottish Historical Review. 7 (27): 217–231. JSTOR 25518208.
- Fraser, G. M. (1905). Historical Aberdeen. Aberdeen: William Smith, The Bon-Accord Press.
- Friar, Stephen (2007). The Sutton Companion to Cathedrals & Abbeys. Sutton Publishing. ISBN 978-0-7509-3890-7.
- Hamilton, Bernard (1980). The Latin Church in the Crusader States - The Secular Church. London: Varium Publications. ISBN 9780860780724.
- Huggon, Martin (2018). The Archaeology of the Medieval Hospitals of England and Wales, 1066-1546 (PDF) (PhD). The University of Sheffield.
- Innes, Cosmo (1845). Registrum Epicopatus Aberdonensis. Vol. I. Aberdeen: Spalding Club.
- Moir, James (1894). Hectoris Boetii, MURTHLACENSIUM ET ABERDONENSIUM EPISCOPORIUM VITAE. Aberdeen: New Spading Club.
- Oram, Richard (2016). "The Medieval Church in the Dioceses of Aberdeen and Moray". In Geddes, J (ed.). Medieval Art, Architecture and Archaeology in the Dioceses of Aberdeen and Moray. Leeds: Routledge. ISBN 9781138640689.
- Monastic Britain: North Sheet. Ordnance Survey. ASIN B0015M9TOA.
- Reid, Norman . (2004). "Cheyne [Le Chen], Henry (d. 1328), bishop of Aberdeen | Oxford Dictionary of National Biography". Oxford Dictionary of National Biography (online ed.). Oxford University Press. doi:10.1093/ref:odnb/5259. (Subscription, Wikipedia Library access or UK public library membership required.)
- Roberts, S. John (2007). An Investigation of Medieval Hospitals in England, Scotland and Wales, 1066–1560 (PhD). University of Wales, Newport.
- Rowlands, Kenneth (1999). The Friars – A History of the British Medieval Friars. Book Guild. ISBN 185776-399-8.
- "Statement of Significance - Kinkell Church" (PDF). historicenvironment.scot. Historic Environment Scotland. 2018.
- Sweet, Alfred H. (July 1919). "The English Benedictines and their Bishops in the Thirteenth Century". The American Historical Review. 24 (4): 565–577. doi:10.2307/1835808. ISSN 0002-8762. JSTOR 1835808.
- Taylor, Simon (2014). "The Medieval Parish in Scotland". The Journal of Scottish Name Studies. 8.
- Thomas, Sarah E. (2018). The Parish and the Chapel in Medieval Britain and Norway. Woodbridge, Suffolk: Boydell Press. ISBN 978-1-78327-314-0.
- Watt, D. E. R.; Murray, A. L. (2003). Fasti Ecclesiae Scoticanae Medii Aevi Ad Annum 1638. Vol. 25 (New Series ed.). The Scottish Record Society. ISBN 0-902054-19-8.
