= Collège des Écossais =

Collège des Écossais (Scots College) can refer to several educational institutions in France:

- Scottish College, Douai at University of Douai
- Collège des Écossais, Montpellier
- Scots College (Paris)

== See also ==
- Scots College (disambiguation)
