= Jacobina Short =

Scientific instrument maker

Jacobina Short (née Downie), (fl. 1780s) was a scientific instrument maker from Edinburgh and mother to Maria Theresa Short who established a wooden observatory and camera obscura on Calton Hill in 1835, followed by its successor on Castlehill in 1851 (subsequently becoming Sir Patrick Geddes' Outlook Tower ).

Jacobina was married to Thomas Short and also associated with Charles Spalding (in whose diving-bell she descended), as well as Vincenzo Lunardi (in whose balloon she tried to ascend), albeit better known for forcibly attempting to take back her former home from her deceased husband's grandson that had inherited the property upon his death.
