= Maria Theresa Short =

Scottish entrepreneur in the 19th century

- Died: 15 January 1869; Edinburgh, Scotland
- Occupation: Scientific instrument maker
- Known for: Scottish entrepreneur involved in the Camera Obscura
- Mother: Jacobina Short

Maria Theresa Short (died 15 January 1869) was a Scottish entrepreneur who increased public access to scientific equipment in Edinburgh in the 19th century. She is known for her involvement with the Camera Obscura. This is still in Edinburgh which is where she was born and died.

== The Short Family ==
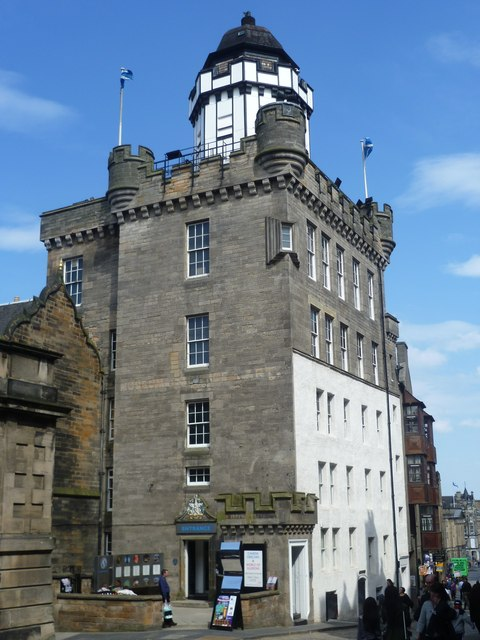
Outlook Tower on Castlehill, Edinburgh. Home of the Camera Obscura.

In the early 18th century, the Short family were scientific instrument makers in Edinburgh's Southside. In 1776, their son, Thomas Short leased some land on Calton Hill and built a Gothic House to display his instruments to the public.

As a condition of his lease, the local council demanded that female relatives of Thomas could not inherit the building and its contents. When he died in 1788, his wife and children did not inherit it.

== Short’s Observatory – Calton Hill ==
In 1827, Maria Theresa Short returned from the West Indies claiming to be Thomas Short's daughter. She claimed his Great Telescope, which was housed in the City Chambers, for her inheritance.

She set up a Popular Observatory, which she opened in a wooden hut next to the Nelson Monument on Calton Hill. After continuous disagreements with the local council, the Lord Provost called for the observatory to be pulled down. Despite her protests, this was done in 1851.

== Short’s Observatory – Castlehill ==
On 26 April 1843, Maria married Robert Henderson, at Saint Cuthbert's, Edinburgh, and in 1852 bought the Laird of Cockpen's townhouse on Castlehill, now known as Old Town, Edinburgh. With the help of sponsors she added an extra two floors and a viewing platform with a dome housing a camera obscura. It was said to have been created in 1853. The building is nowadays known as the Outlook Tower.

Short's age has been historically contested. In the 1861 census, she and her husband were recorded as living in the tower. She was noted as being 58 years old, but if she had really been the daughter of Thomas Short she would have needed to be 82. Therefore, it seems unlikely that she was actually his daughter.

In 1869, she died, "aged about 70" in the Outlook Tower. Her widower continued to run the attraction until it was taken over by Patrick Geddes in 1892.

== See also ==
- Patrick Geddes
- Outlook Tower

== Sources ==
- Brück, Mary, Women in Early British and Irish Astronomy: Stars and Satellites, Springer, 2009, pp 20–22
- Gilbert W M, Edinburgh in the 19th Century, J and R Allan, 1901
- Wallace, Veronica. “Maria Obscura”, Edinburgh Review 88 (1992): 101–109.
