= Norah Geddes =

Scottish landscape architect (1887–1967)

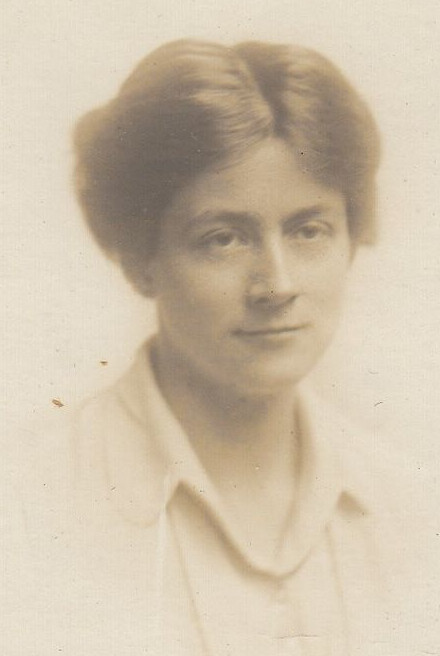
- Geddes circa 1915
- Born: 1887
- Died: 1967 (aged 79–80)
- Education: Edinburgh School of Art
- Known for: Landscape design
- Spouse: Frank Mears
- Children: 3
- Parents: Sir Patrick Geddes (father); Anna Morton, Lady Geddes (mother)

Norah Geddes (1887–1967) was a Scottish landscape designer.

== Early life and education ==
Geddes was born in 1887. Her parents were Sir Patrick Geddes and Lady Anna Geddes née Morton, and she had two brothers Alisdair (born 1891) and Arthur (born 1895). Her childhood is described in The New Biographical Dictionary of Scottish Women as "unconventional and peripatetic" and lacking conventional schooling. She attended her father's botany course at the University of Dundee when she was 14 before moving to the Edinburgh College of Art for drawing lessons.

== Career ==
Both her parents worked extensively to improve conditions for the poor, and so Norah's first endeavour was to provide window box planting. She took a leading role in her father's Open Spaces project, which aimed to revive derelict urban plots with gardens and play areas. In 1908, the group carried out a survey to locate sites within the city that could be used to provide outdoor recreation areas for the local residents and their children. In 1909, she opened White Hart Garden below Johnstone Gardens – the first in a series of spaces brought back to life by her designs.

Geddes joined her father's Open Spaces Committee at the Outlook Tower and Camera Obscura but was left frustrated with her scope of work in the role. Initially she contributed significantly to the planning and layout of the Royal Zoological Society Scotland Garden. It was inspired by zoos in Hamburg and New York, which moved away from the caged menageries of the Victorian era and instead promoted large open enclosures and naturalistic settings. It had pet corners and promoted opportunities for education. Her part in this innovation was overshadowed by those of her husband and her father.

Geddes has been described as "One of the early pioneers of creating green spaces in an urban environment for the benefit for the local community. Norah's work 110 years ago is still incredibly important today." Her project in the West Port garden, was celebrated in 2023, and an embroidered and patchwork banner produced by the local Grassmarket community group, GRASS created about the development of the garden, was displayed in the Edinburgh Central Library. The garden had become a social centre for the community a century before, including a boxing club, organised by soldiers from the Castle, knitting classes for girls and scouting for boys as well as a police box and student training in kindergarten methods.

The display included a quote from an English friend in 1923, who said "Here, among the flowers, children can play while parents, oft-times too weary to climb the steep paths to the top, can sit just within the gate and read or sew or talk as they desire."

After the Second World War, the management of the West Port Garden transferred to the City Council.

== Personal life ==
Geddes met her husband Frank Mears, an assistant to her father Patrick Geddes, in 1913. The couple lived in Ramsay Garden. Once married, their eldest son, Kenneth, was born the following year; Alastair in 1918, and John two years later. By this point, Geddes's landscape gardening career was effectively over.

== Notable works ==
- The Royal Zoological Society Scotland Garden
- Chessel's Court, Edinburgh
- Johnstone Terrace, Edinburgh
- The West Port Garden, Edinburgh
- A number of playgrounds in Dublin
