= John de Pilmuir =

Scottish bishop

John de Pilmuir [Pilmor, Pylmore] (died 1362) was a 14th-century prelate based in Scotland. He was probably the son of Adam de Pilmuir, a Dundee burgess, and the brother of Richard de Pilmuir, Bishop of Dunkeld (1337/38–1345/47).

Originally a canon of the diocese of Ross, on 30 March 1326, he was consecrated by Pope John XXII as Bishop of Moray at Avignon. The diocese of Moray had been reserved during the episcopate of David de Moravia, and this along with the lack of any record of an election in Moray makes it probable that Pilmuir was a direct appointment of the papacy. He had previously been the vicar in spirituals of Pierre Roger, Archbishop of Rouen, the future Pope Clement VI.

As a bishop, Pilmuir was a frequent petitioner to the papacy. He completed the foundation of the Scots College in Paris, initiated by his predecessor in Moray David de Moravia. The college remain the responsibility of the Bishops of Moray until the Reformation. He died at episcopal residence of Spynie Castle on 28 September 1362. His episcopate was followed by the famous and eventful episcopate of Alexander Bur.

Religious titles
Preceded by David de Moravia	Bishop of Moray; 1326–1362	Succeeded by Alexander Bur
