= Meller =

Meller is a surname. Notable people with the surname include:

- Amos Meller (1938–2007), Israeli composer and conductor
- David Meller (born 1959), British businessman
- Edward Meller (c. 1647 – 1699), English politician
- Helen Elizabeth Meller (born 1941), English urban historian
- Nina Genke-Meller (1893–1954), Ukrainian-Russian artist, designer, graphic artist and scenographer
- Richard James Meller (1872–1940), British barrister and politician
- Robert Meller (1564–1624), English politician
- Stefan Meller (1942–2008), Polish diplomat and academician
- Vadym Meller (1884–1962), Ukrainian-Russian Soviet artist, theatrical designer, book illustrator and architect
- Walter Meller (1819–1886), British politician from Stafford

== See also ==
- Meller's duck (Anas melleri), a dabbling duck
- Meller's mongoose (Rhynchogale melleri), a mongoose
- Mellers, surname
- Melodrama, which in theater slang is referred to as meller
