= Kelber =

Kelber is a surname. Notable people with the surname include:

- Michel Kelber (1908–1996), French cinematographer
- Rudolf Kelber (born 1948), German organist, harpsichordist, conductor, and church musician
- Ulrich Kelber (born 1968), German politician
- Werner Kelber, New testament scholar

== See also ==
- Keller (surname)
- Melber
