= John de Innes =

Scottish churchman

- Bishop of Moray
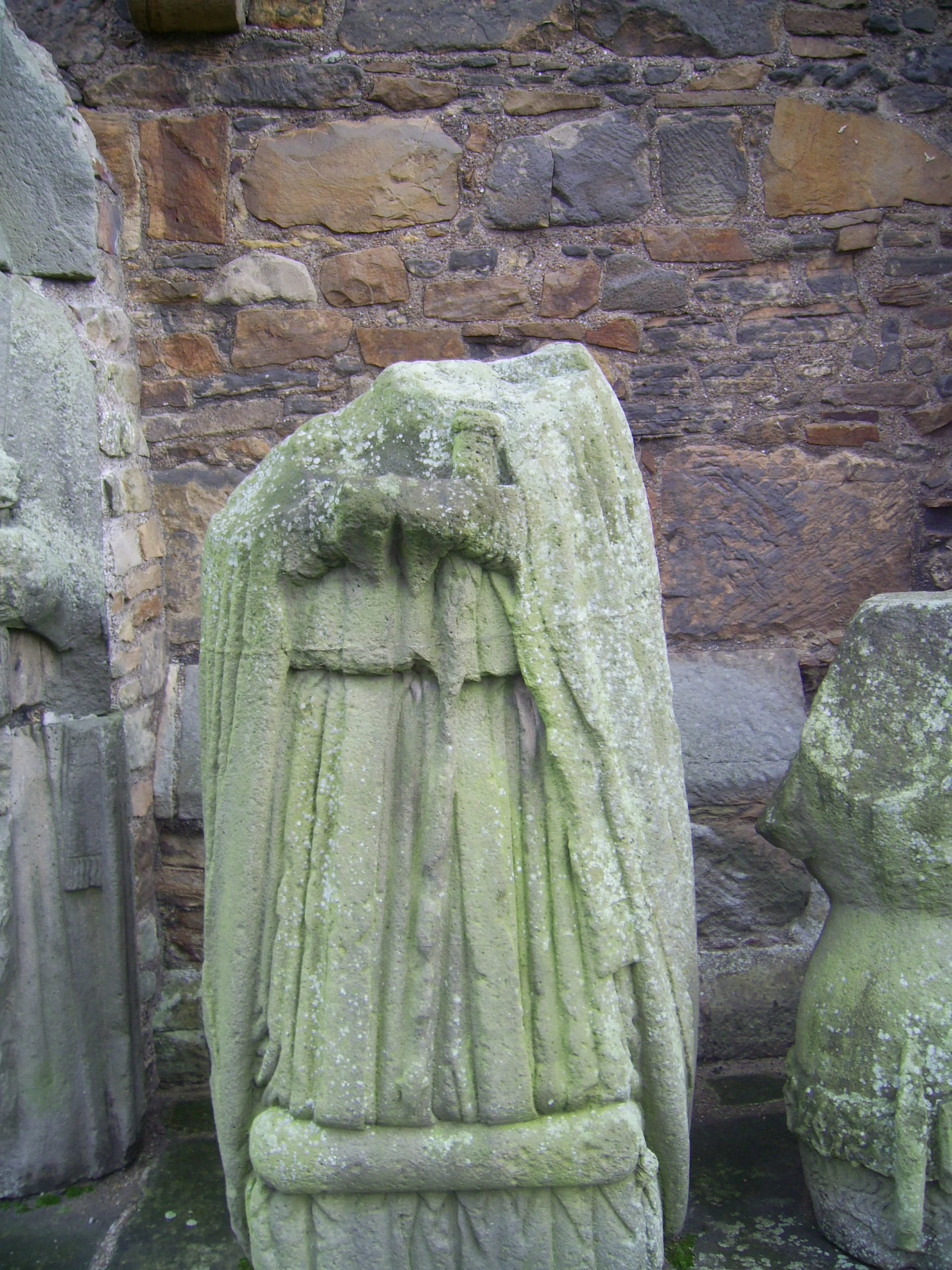
- Church: Roman Catholic Church
- See: Diocese of Moray
- In office: 1407–1414
- Predecessor: William de Spynie
- Successor: Henry de Lichton
- Previous post(s): Archdeacon of Caithness (1396–1398)

Orders
- Consecration: January 1407

Personal details
- Born: c. 1370; Moray
- Died: 1414; Elgin

John de Innes (c. 1370–1414) was a Scottish medieval churchman. Born probably in Moray, he went to France in his youth, receiving a bachelorate in civil law from the University of Paris by 1396 and in canon law by 1407. His education was partly paid for by the prebend of Duffus and a grant from Alexander Bur, Bishop of Moray, taken by Bur from the judicial profits of his diocese. During Innes' study period, he was also pursuing an ecclesiastical career, being Archdeacon of Caithness from 1396 until 1398, and Dean of Ross, from some point between 1396 and 1398 until 1407.

He gave up the latter position in that year, having been elected as Bishop of Moray sometime in late 1406, and receiving consecration from Pope Benedict XIII in either Italy or southern France in the following January. Innes was bishop for over seven years, and died at Elgin on 2 August 1414. Innes has been traditionally credited with supervising much of the rebuilding to Elgin Cathedral. The historian David Ditchburn believes Innes was an ally, and possibly even a client, of Alexander Stewart, Earl of Mar, and perhaps his father Alexander Stewart, Earl of Buchan, the latter of whom was the warlord responsible for burning down Elgin Cathedral during the episcopate of Alexander Bur.

== Notes ==
Religious titles
Preceded by William Forrester	Archdeacon of Caithness; 1396–1398	Succeeded by Alexander Vaus
Preceded by William de Spynie	Bishop of Moray; 1407–1414	Succeeded by Henry de Lichton
