= Anna Geddes =

English social activist

- Born: Anna Morton; 19 November 1857; Liverpool, UK
- Died: 9 June 1917; Lucknow
- Resting place: India
- Spouse: Sir Patrick Geddes (m. 1886)
- Children: 3
- Parent: Frazer Morton

Anna, Lady Geddes (née Morton; 19 November 1857 – 9 June 1917) was an English social environmental activist, musician and partner in the work of Sir Patrick Geddes. During the marriage, she provided organisational and intellectual support to many of his projects, and they travelled extensively during their work together.

== Early life and education ==
Anna Geddes was born Anna Morton to an Ulster Scot merchant Frazer Morton and his wife in Liverpool on 19 November 1857, and was the fourth of six children. She was born into a strict Presbyterian household, but was encouraged to pursue music; after finishing boarding school she was sent to Dresden to study singing and piano, later becoming a music teacher.

In London, Geddes began to focus on social work, during an era that included a movement for women's suffrage in the United Kingdom, as well as the work of Octavia Hill and Josephine Butler. She formed a social enterprise for girls in Liverpool, and in 1884 she helped to found the Environmental Society (which later evolved into the better known Social Union) along with her sister Edith and her husband James Oliphant (headmaster of a private school for young ladies in Charlotte Square), which is where she met Patrick Geddes.

== Career ==
Whilst visiting her younger sister Edith and her husband James Oliphant in 1883, she met Oliphant's colleague Patrick Geddes. They married in April 1886, after which she was very involved in the work of her husband "as an independent-minded, 'heroic', selfless and 'cheerful' partner" (J. Arthur Thomson, quoted Mairet 1957, p. 80). She often oversaw finance and administration aspects of Patrick's work and often travelled with him, including to Cyprus, the United States, Paris, and India. Her background as an Englishwoman and daughter of a Liverpool merchant was considered by Helen Meller, writing in Patrick Geddes: Social Evolutionist and City Planner, to have "lent credibility and authority to her husband's social crusade of culture".

In the late 1880s, after the formation of the Edinburgh Social Union in 1885, which brought artists and musicians together for public performances, Geddes became close friends with Marjory Kennedy Fraser, and they performed piano together and shared child care. Geddes and Fraser led the entertainment committee of Edinburgh Social Union, which organised events focussed on music and poetry. According to Meller, "her one outlet, in an often busy and harassed life, was her music." Geddes oversaw many practical details during the Summer Meetings organised by her husband in the 1890s, especially the music - calling upon performers such as Marjory Kennedy Fraser. Her travels with her husband included journeying to Cyprus and organizing care for Armenian refugees (1896–7), visiting the United States in late 1899 through early 1900, and spending most of 1900 in Paris, where Patrick ran a summer school during the World's Fair.

Her correspondence with the Scottish artist Margaret Macdonald Mackintosh is discussed in an article describing the development of the city of Lucknow, India. Her correspondence with French geographer Élisée Reclus is discussed in an article describing collaboration of Patrick Geddes within a network of contemporaneous anarchist geographers.

== Personal life ==
Geddes gave birth to their first child, Norah in 1887, followed by Alasdair and Arthur, in a rundown tenement, James Court, in the Lawnmarket, where the couple had moved to work on the Edinburgh Old Town rehabilitation schemes. While Geddes was pregnant with Norah, Patrick decided to create a student hostel by renting several flats near their home, and it became the responsibility of Geddes to attend to the practical chores of cleaning and furnishing the residences.

They moved into Ramsay Garden after Geddes received her inheritance from her father in 1891, which was used to substantially finance the building development. All three of their children were educated at home. They spent summers in the Dundee countryside.

The Geddes' daughter, Norah Geddes (1897–1967), became a garden designer or 'landscape architect'. She planned and created gardens and playgrounds in slum areas of Dublin (1911–13) and in Edinburgh's Old Town, as a member of Geddes's Open Spaces committee. She also worked with her father and his assistant, her future husband, Frank Mears, on designing Edinburgh Zoo in 1913. They married in July 1915.

== Death ==
In 1917, during a second visit to India, while she was the primary organiser of a version of the Edinburgh Summer meetings that was planned to feature Rabindranath Tagore, Geddes died from typhoid fever in Lucknow. She was cremated in India.
