= William de Spynie =

Scottish prelate

William de Spynie (died 1406) was a Scottish prelate. He was a canon of Moray by 1363 and Precentor (Chanter) of Aberdeen in 1371. By 1372 x 1373, he had exchanged the latter position with William Boyl for the Precentorship of Moray. He had become Dean of Aberdeen by 1388. It is possible he had become Dean of Dunkeld in 1397, though this may be a mistake in the source, "Aberdeen" rather than "Dunkeld" being meant. At any rate, in that year he was elected as the Bishop of Moray. He travelled to France and on September 1397 was consecrated as Bishop.

William de Spynie's episcopate, like that of his predecessor Alexander Bur's, suffered amid the political insecurity in this part of Scotland. Alexander of Lochaber, brother of Domhnall of Islay, Lord of the Isles, had been using his role as "protector" of Moray, assigned to him by his brother and the absentee Earl, to further his own lordship. This included granting episcopal lands to his military followers. Tension gradually mounted and on 3 July 1402 Alexander burned much of the town of Elgin and plundered Elgin Cathedral. Bishop William excommunicated Alexander, and later in the year Alexander came to Spynie seeking forgiveness and bearing a gift of a large golden candle. Alexander was thereafter absolved.

Bishop William died at Elgin on 2 August 1406. He was buried in the choir.

Religious titles
Preceded by Robert Monypenny	Precentor of Aberdeen; 1371–1372 x 1373	Succeeded by William Boyl
Preceded by William Boyl	Precentor of Moray; 1372 x 1373–1397	Succeeded by James de Dunbar
Preceded by Thomas Stewart	Dean of Dunkeld (?); 1397 (?)	Succeeded by Robert de Cardeny
Preceded by Simon de Ketenis	Dean of Aberdeen; 1388–1397	Succeeded by Patrick de Spalding
Preceded by Alexander Bur	Bishop of Moray; 1397–1406	Succeeded by John de Innes
