= David de Moravia =

- Bishop of Moray
- Church: Roman Catholic Church
- See: Diocese of Moray
- In office: 1299–1326
- Predecessor: Archibald
- Successor: John de Pilmuir
- Previous post: Canon of Elgin Cathedral

Orders
- Consecration: 28 June 1299 at Anagni in Italy

Personal details
- Born: Prob. mid-13th century Probably Moray or Sutherland
- Died: 6 January 1326

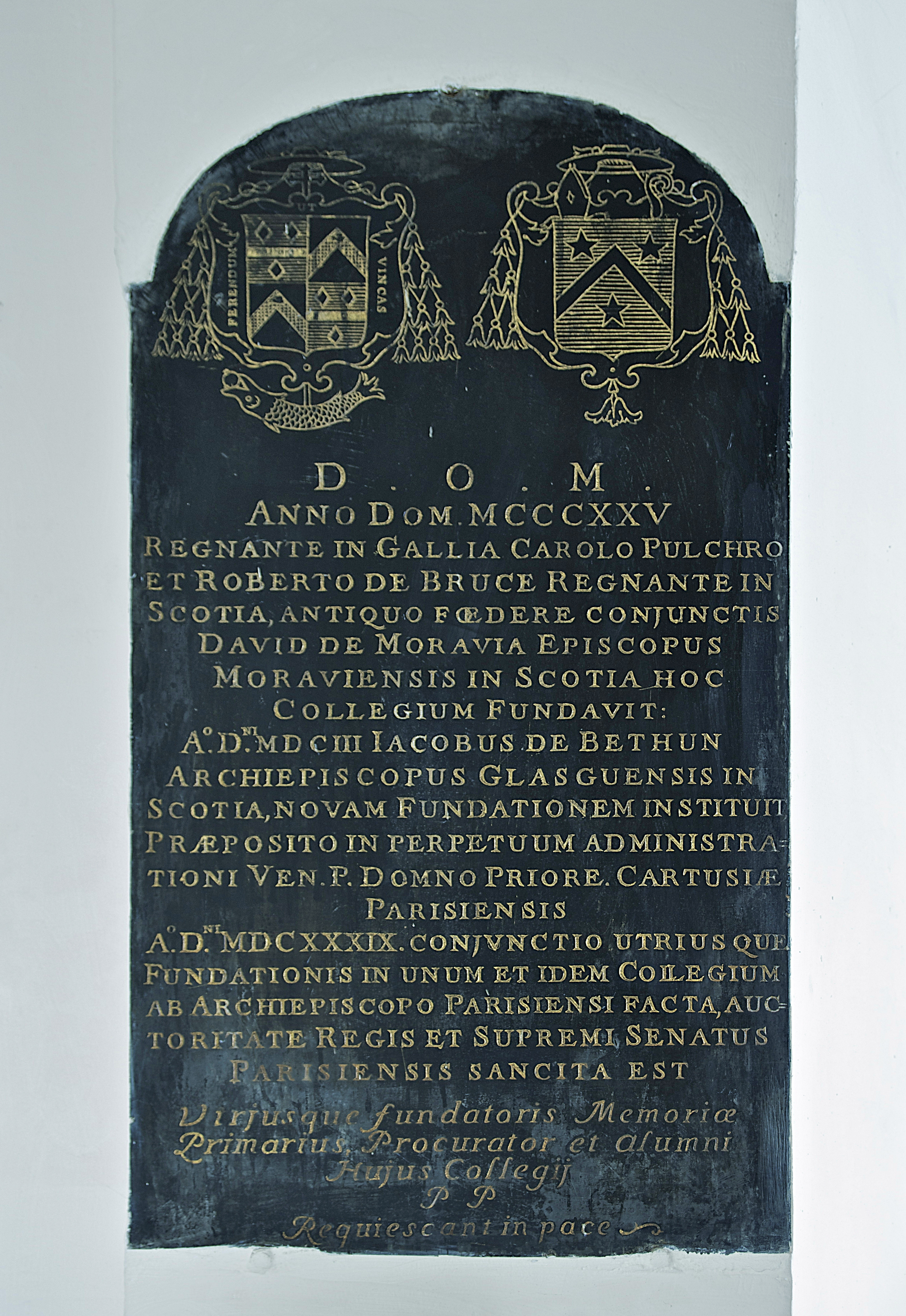
In the chapel of the Scots College in Paris, old plaque relating the foundation of the college by David de Moravia, with his Coat of Arms (right)

David de Moravia (died 1326) was Bishop of Moray during most of the First War of Scottish Independence. He was elected Bishop of Moray, probably in early 1299. Extended details exist regarding the election because of an extant letter of Pope Boniface VIII. The result of the election was that David had 13 votes, the Dean had 4 votes, the Chancellor had 3 votes and the Archdeacon 1 vote. The Dean declared that David was elected, and sent a request for confirmation to the Papacy. The latter found an irregularity, though what exactly this was not revealed. The election result was nominally declared void, but the Pope himself provided David directly to the bishopric. He was consecrated as bishop at Anagni in Italy on 28 June 1299, by Matthew of Aquasparta, Cardinal-Bishop of Porto.

In 1306, King Edward I of England charged Bishop David with complicity in the murder of John Comyn III of Badenoch.

The bishop attended the coronation of Robert I of Scotland as King of Scots at Scone Abbey on 25 March 1306. In Moray, the bishop exhorted his flock that they were no less worthy fighting the English invaders than if they "should fight in the Holy Lands against pagans and Saracens." The bishop was excommunicated and fled to the Earldom of Orkney. King Edward sent a request to King Haakon V of Norway for Bishop David to be arrested. Bishop David evaded capture and returned to Scotland at the same time as King Robert the following year. In March 1309, the bishop took part in the Scottish parliament confirming the right of King Robert to the throne of Scotland.

On 17 June 1320, the bishop was again excommunicated, along with King Robert and other Scottish nobles and clergy, by Pope John XXII, as an enemy of King Edward II of England. On the orders of the Pope, the Bishop of Dunblane and the Bishop of Winchester delivered a sentence of excommunication on David and other bishops on 23 May 1322. The excommunication was later withdrawn.

Bishop David is also notable, in addition to being a Scottish patriot, as the founder of the Scots College in Paris in 1325, by donating the land on which it was built. The foundation was confirmed by Charles IV of France in August 1326. Bishop David, however, had died on 6 January 1326, before the college was formally instituted. He was buried in the choir of Elgin Cathedral.

== Notes ==
Religious titles
Preceded by Archibald	Bishop of Moray; 1299–1326	Succeeded by John de Pilmuir
