= John Hardie Wilson =

John Hardie Wilson FRSE (1858–1920) was a 19th/20th-century Scottish botanist and photographer. He specialised in the disease resistance of crops and fruits, with a particular interest in disease-resistant potatoes. As a potato breeder he created Rector, Bishop and Templar.

== Life ==
He was born in St Andrews the second son of James Wilson, a horticulturalist and owner of Greenside Nurseries. He was educated at Madras College in St Andrews. He then had a horticulturalist apprentice at the Royal Botanic Gardens, Edinburgh from around 1872.

In Edinburgh he undertook formal studies in botany at the University of Edinburgh. He then studied forestry in classes at the Botanic Gardens, winning a first class certificate. In 1886 he returned to the University of St Andrews to obtain a degree in natural history. From 1887 he was a Demonstrator in the botany class. He graduated with a BSc in 1888.

He gained a doctorate (DSc) in 1889, founding the University Science Club in the same year. He was also highly involved in creating the University Botanic Garden, a teaching garden. This he created with the assistance of Thomas Berwick.

He resigned in 1890 for unclear reasons. In 1891 he created a teaching garden at the Morgan Academy in Dundee assisted by the older but less experienced Patrick Geddes.

In 1891 he was elected a Fellow of the Royal Society of Edinburgh. His proposers were William Carmichael M'Intosh, Hugh Cleghorn, Sir Isaac Bayley Balfour and John Muirhead Macfarlane.

In 1894 he reappears at the University of St Andrews, lecturing in agriculture. From 1894 to 1897 he lectured in botany at the University of Leeds. He returned to the University of St Andrews in 1898.

In 1899 the Royal Horticultural Society awarded him the Banksian Medal. In 1908 the Royal Caledonian Horticultural Society awarded him the Neill Prize.

During the First World War all the University's gardeners were called up and Wilson took on the role of maintaining the garden single-handed. This allegedly contributed to his death.

He died of pleurisy and pneumonia at home in St Andrews on 13 January 1920.

== Photography ==
His large collection of glass plate negatives is held by the University of St Andrews and is partly in the Cowie Collection with the majority held by the Botany Department.

== Publications ==
- Observations on the Fertilisation and Hybridisation of some Species of Albuca (1891)
- Nature Study Rambles Round St Andrews (1910)
