= Melber =

Melber is a surname. Notable people with the surname include:

- Ari Melber (born 1980), American attorney and journalist
- Henning Melber (born 1950), German-Namibian Africanist and political activist

== See also ==
- Meller
