= Archdeacon of Moray =

The Archdeacon of Moray was the only archdeacon in the Diocese of Moray, acting as a deputy of the Bishop of Moray. The archdeacon held the parish churches of Forres and Edinkillie as a prebends since 1207. The following is a list of known historical archdeacons:

== List of archdeacons of Moray ==
- Thomas, fl. 1179 x 1188
- Robert, fl. 1197 x 1206
- Gilbert de Moravia, 1206 x 1208-1222 x 1224
- Hugh, x 1225-1227 x
- Ranulf, x 1228-1232 x
- William, 1235-1249 x
- Archibald Herok, x 1258-1275
- John, fl. 1281 x 1299
- Stephen de Donydouer, x 1316-1317
- Adam Penny, fl. 1327
- Alexander Bur, 1350-1362
- William de Forres, 1363-1370
- Stephen, fl. 1371
- Duncan Petit, x 1385-1385 x 1393
- Hugh Dickson de Dalmahoy, 1393-1394 x
- James de Dunbar, 1397-1408
- Adam de Nairn, 1408-1409x1414
- William de Camera, 1408-x 1430
- John de Forbes, x 1430
- 1430-1435
- William de Dunbar, 1430-1435
- Nicholas de Atholl, 1430-1435
  - Robert de Crannach, 1430-1433
  - Robert Scrymgeour, 1435
- Henry Hervy, 1435-1438 x 1440
- John de Atholl, 1435-1437
- Duncan de Lichton, 1437
- David Ogilvie, 1438 x 1440-1443 x 1444
- Robert de Tulloch, 1443
- Thomas Spens, 1444-1447 x 1448
- Patrick Fraser, 1445-1448 x 1462
- Archibald Whitelaw, 1462 x 1463-1466 x 1467
- Thomas Cockburn, 1462
- Archibald Knowles, 1467-1473 x 1475
- Robert de Forrest, 1467-1467 x 1468
- Alexander de Meldrum, 1467-1467 x 1468
- Andrew of Forfar, 1468
- John Edwardi (?Edwardson), 1468
- John Garden, 1475-1479
- John Calder, 1476
- John Ruch, 1476
- James Allardice, 1476-1506 x x1507
- Alexander Crichton, x 1508
- John Estoun, 1508
- Patrick Paniter, 1509-1513
- Thomas Nudry, 1510-1526 x 1527
- James Douglas, 1527-1533
  - Alexander Hervy, 1529
  - Sixtus Zuchellus, 1529-1530
- John Bellenden, 1533-1538
- Archibald Dunbar, 1539-1551 x 1565
- John Lesley, 1565-1567
- Gavin Dunbar, 1574-1613
- Patrick Tulloch, 1613-1638

== Bibliography ==
- Watt, D.E.R., Fasti Ecclesiae Scoticanae Medii Aevi ad annum 1638, 2nd Draft, (St Andrews, 1969), pp. 237–42

== See also ==
- Bishop of Moray
