= Scots Kirk =

The Scots Kirk is The Kirk, the Church of Scotland.

It can also refer to several Scottish churches abroad:

- Scots Kirk, Hamilton, New South Wales, Australia
- Scots Kirk, Mosman, New South Wales, Australia
- The Scots Kirk, Paris, France
- Scots Kirk, Rotterdam, the Netherlands
- Scots Kirk, Lausanne, Switzerland
- St Andrew's Scots Kirk, Kingston, Jamaica
- Church of St Andrew and St Columba, Mumbai, India

== See also ==
- Scots College (disambiguation)
