= Scotch College =

Scotch College is the name of several schools affiliated with either the Uniting Church or Presbyterian Church. (There are also a number of schools and Roman Catholic seminaries called Scots College.)

- Scotch College, Adelaide, in Torrens Park and Mitcham, South Australia
- Scotch College, Melbourne, in Hawthorn, Victoria
- Scotch College, Perth, in Swanbourne, Western Australia
- Scotch College, Launceston, in Tasmania; amalgamated with Oakburn College in 1979 to form Scotch Oakburn College
