= Helen Elizabeth Meller =

Academic and urban historian

Helen Elizabeth Meller (born 1941) is an English urban historian and pioneer of the study of modern planning as a relevant and important subject for research and historical study. One of the founders of the International Planning History Society (IPHS), editor of their journal Planning Perspectives and a founding editor of the book series Studies in International Planning History. She is a biographer of the sociologist and advocate of urban planning, Patrick Geddes.

== Career and research ==
Meller completed her doctoral studies at the University of Bristol in 1968, and moved to the University of Nottingham that same year to take up a lecturing appointment in the School of History. Se remained there for the duration of her academic career. In 1995 Meller was appointed Reader in Economic and Social History, and subsequently Professor Emerita of Urban History. Meller has published extensively on urban history, leisure activities in 19th-century cities, women and cities, green spaces in cities and international planning history. Her first book, Leisure and the Changing City, published in 1976 was a study of Bristol. In 1977 she delivered her first paper on Patrick Geddes and published one of many books about him, becoming recognised as the first historian to engage with the breadth and depth of his work across the world.

In 1975 Meller was one of the founders of the UK Planning History Group, the predecessor of the International Planning History Society (IPHS). She was treasurer from 2007 to 2014. In 1988 she became the fifth warden at Florence Boot Hall on the University of Nottingham, Campus. That same year researching and producing a history of the hall to mark the 70th anniversary of the female only residence.

Meller maintained a commitment to furthering women’s history and feminism throughout her career. As well as making a significant contribution to the University of Nottingham’s History and local History of Nottingham.

== Honours ==
Sir Peter Hall Award for Lifetime Achievement in Planning History: the award is the most prestigious prize awarded by the IPHS. It recognizes sustained excellence for a body of published work that has made an outstanding contribution to international scholarship and conveyed the relevance of planning history to contemporary planning challenges.

== Select publications ==
- Imagining culture and the city in planning history: some reflections on the public and private.January 2009 Planning Perspectives 24(1):99-115
- Housing and Town Planning, 1900-1939 December 2007, A Companion to Early Twentieth-Century Britain (pp.388-404)
- Planning Theory and Women's Role in The City, May 1990 Urban History 17:85-98
- Patrick Geddes: Social Evolutionist and City Planner. (Geography, Environment and Planning Series.) New York: Routledge, Chapman & Hall. 1990. Pp. xvi, 359. Volume 23 Issue 4 - Richard A. Soloway
