= Scots College =

Scots College or Scots School may refer to:

== Catholic seminaries ==
- Scots College, Paris, France, (founded 1325)
- Scots College, Douai, France, (founded 1573)
- Scots College, Rome, Italy, (founded 1600), also known as The Pontifical Scots College
- Royal Scots College, Spain (founded 1627)

== Other establishments ==
=== Australia ===
- Scots College (Sydney), in Bellevue Hill, Sydney
- Scots PGC College, in Warwick, Queensland, formed by the merger of The Scots College, Warwick and The Presbyterian Girls' College
- Scots School Albury, New South Wales
- Scots School, Bathurst, New South Wales

=== France ===
- Collège des Écossais, Montpellier ('Scots College')
- Scots College (Paris)

=== New Zealand ===
- Scots College, Wellington

== See also ==
- Bombay Scottish School
- Scotch College (disambiguation)
- Scots Kirk (disambiguation)
