= Mellers =

Mellers is a surname. Notable people with the surname include:

- Agnes Mellers (died 1513/4), English benefactor and school founder
- Barbara Mellers, American psychologist
- Wilfrid Mellers (1914–2008), English music critic, musicologist and composer
