= Alexander Bur =

Scottish cleric

- Bishop of Moray
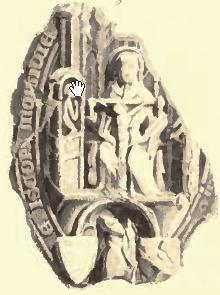
- Seal of Alexander Bur.
- Church: Roman Catholic Church
- See: Diocese of Moray
- In office: 1362—1397
- Predecessor: John de Pilmuir
- Successor: William de Spynie
- Previous post(s): Archdeacon of Moray

Orders
- Ordination: before 1343
- Consecration: Early 1363

Personal details
- Born: 1320s or 1330s Aberdeenshire.
- Died: 15 May 1397; Spynie Palace, Moray

Alexander Bur (died 1397) was a 14th-century Scottish cleric. It is highly possible that Bur came from somewhere in or around Aberdeenshire, although that is not certain and is only based on the knowledge that Aberdeenshire is where other people bearing his surname come from in this period. He entered the service of King David II of Scotland sometime after 1343, perhaps as a member of David's exiled court at Château Gaillard. Although Alexander by this point in time already held prebends in both the bishopric of Aberdeen and the bishopric of Dunkeld (where he also held a canonry), on that date King David petitioned Pope Clement VI for another canonry in the bishopric of Moray. Alexander had become a royal clerk and had obtained a Licentiate in Canon Law by 1350. By the latter date, upon the death of Adam Penny (or Adam Parry), Archdeacon of Moray, Alexander himself became Archdeacon.

In the autumn of this year King David II made an expedition into the north, apparently to escape the effects of the Black Death. David was also re-establishing his authority in the area, which involved seizing the castle of Kildrummy from its owner, Thomas, Earl of Mar. Soon after David reached Kildrummy, John de Pilmuir, Bishop of Moray, died. This gave King David the opportunity to secure the election of his close follower, Alexander Bur, as the successor to Pilmuir. David was staying at the episcopal castle at Spynie, a possession of Bishop of St. Andrews, and his presence there undoubtedly ensured that the canons carried out the king's will. Alexander was at Avignon in late December 1362, where he is mentioned as "bishop-elect and confirmed" of Moray, but he was not consecrated by the Pope until sometime between early January and early February 1363.

Alexander Bur was involved in a famous conflict with Alexander Stewart, Earl of Buchan and Lord of Badenoch which famously led to the burning of Elgin Cathedral. He died at Spynie Palace on 15 May 1397.

== Notes ==
Religious titles
Preceded by Adam Penny	Archdeacon of Moray; 1350–1362	Succeeded by William de Forres
Preceded by John de Pilmuir	Bishop of Moray; 1362–1397	Succeeded by William de Spynie
