= Collège des Écossais, Montpellier =

Coordinates: 43.6360°N 3.8585°E

The College Des Ecossais (Scots College) was founded by Patrick Geddes in 1924 as an international teaching establishment located in Montpellier, in the south of France.

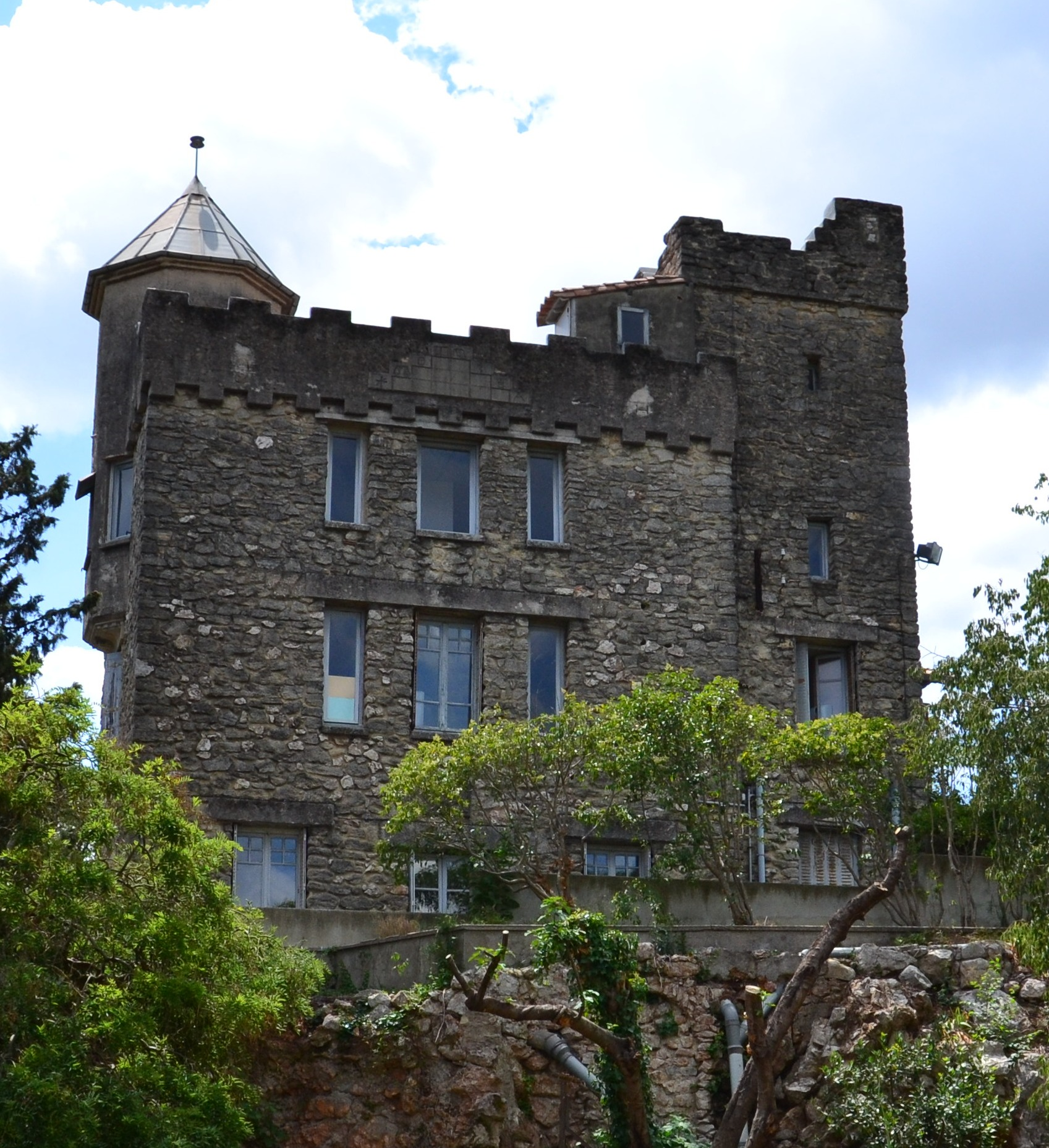
Collège écossais montpellier

== The site ==
When coming back in Europe in 1924 after a long stay in India, Geddes decided to settle with his daughter Norah in Montpellier, a city that was already linked with Scotland since the Middle Ages, when it became the European capital of medicine: "In this he was harking back to medieval ideas, looking for unity among scholars who saw a wholeness in their studies and in where they lived with others from other lands".

As the Jardin des plantes de Montpellier, first botanical garden in France, was implemented there in 1593 as part of the medicine faculty, the place had a long-standing tradition in these sciences. Moreover, the biologist Charles Flahault, that Geddes considered the greatest of their times was living there. The concept of the Scots College as an international students’ Center emerged during Geddes’ first travel to Montpellier in 1890, when invited by his friend Charles Flahault after he met the French botanist at the Marine Station of Roscoff in 1878.

== The buildings ==
Like the one he had already installed in 1892 in Royal Mile when renovating Edinburgh Old Town, Geddes had an Outlook Tower attached to the Scottish Pavilion, both erected by the local architect Edmond Leenhardt in white local stone. He had also an Indian Pavilion designed and built by his son-in-law Frank Mears, that was to be headed by Rabindranath Tagore. An American Pavilion was also in program.

The concept of itinerant students went back to earlier times when students throughout Europe would travel to other countries and institutions to complete their education in real situations rather than be restricted to dry home and university study. But as the college was also conceived as an educational and research center, the Scottish Pavilion also housed the SIGMA (International Station of Mediterranean and Alpine Geobotany) laboratory founded by Josias Braun-Blanquet, the Swiss botanist settled in Montpellier after he submitted a dissertation on phytosociology supervised by Flahault.

== The gardens ==
By conceiving it as a place for teaching not only regional culture, geography, town planning, sociology, biology, botany and other sciences, but mainly “Life As a Whole”, Geddes created, at Montpellier, the last of what the French philosopher Thierry Paquot calls his finest invention: the pedagogical garden. To the end of his life he insisted on teaching outdoors whenever possible, taking his students on long walks into the neighbouring countryside. He was an environmentalist long before the word “environment” became fashionable, and his teachings are increasingly studied and applied today.

As he already did years ahead with the original thematic botanic garden he created in the University of Dundee, then dedicated to Shakespeare’s flowers, Geddes dedicates several parterres in that parcel of Mediterranean landscape to the Greek philosophers on both sides of an alley of cypress trees.

So, for Geddes, the garden is the ideal place for practicing the wise conclusion of Voltaire’s Candide. An active, constructive peace is the only one that can compete with war and its glory: action. Therefore, said Geddes, peace means an unending fight against disease and slums, ignorance and economic injustice, against deforestation and waste of natural resources; peace means, both concretely and figuratively, that everyone must cultivate his garden, il faut cultiver son jardin…

== The College nowadays and Geddes’ heritage in France ==
Thanks to the Metagraphies non-profit, the whole site was gazetted as a ”Monument historique” in December 2013. Until then, the Cité internationale universitaire de Paris was the only students’ hostel to be considered so. With Metagraphies, Sabine Kraus has organised commented visits of the college on several occasions, in order to illustrate in vivo how Geddes’ human ecology unifies Nature and Civilisation. By Leaves We Live, Vivendo Discimus, Conservative Surgery, Think Global Act Local, the Valley Section,... by wandering through the actual site, everyone can see how all these concepts are engraved into the form of thinking machines on the walls of the Scottish Pavilion, as well as modeled in the landscape.

== See also ==
- Outlook Tower, Edinburgh, on which the College Des Ecossais building was originally modelled
- Collège des Écossais, Paris
- Scots College (disambiguation)
