= Scots College (Paris) =

Former college of the University of Paris

Scots College Paris
- French: Collège des Écossais
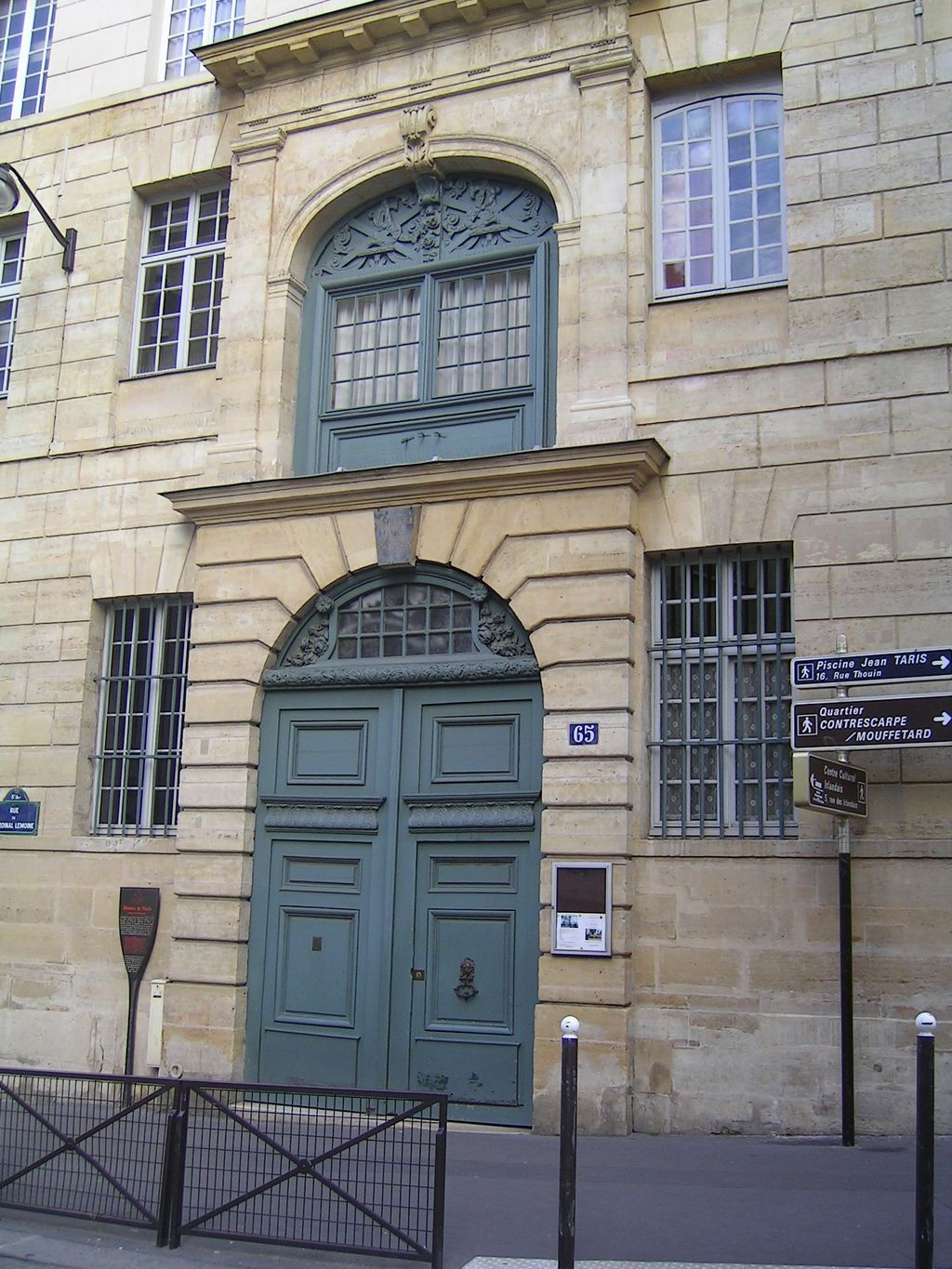
- Entrance of the Scots College (Paris)
- Latin: Collegium Scoticum
- Other names: College of Grisy
- Type: Seminary/College
- Active: 1333–1793
- Founders: David de Moravia
- Religious affiliation: Roman Catholic
- Academic affiliations: University of Paris
- Location: 65 Rue du Cardinal Lemoine, 75005 Paris, France; 48.8458543°N 2.3506909°E

The Scots College (Latin: Collegium Scoticum; French: Collège des Écossais) was a college of the University of Paris, France, founded by an act of the Parliament of Paris on 8 July 1333. The act was a ratification of an event that had already taken place, the founding of the Collegium Scoticum, one of a number of national colleges into which the university was divided. The Scots College came to an end in 1793 when the National Convention abolished the colleges and reorganized the university along different lines.

== Early history ==
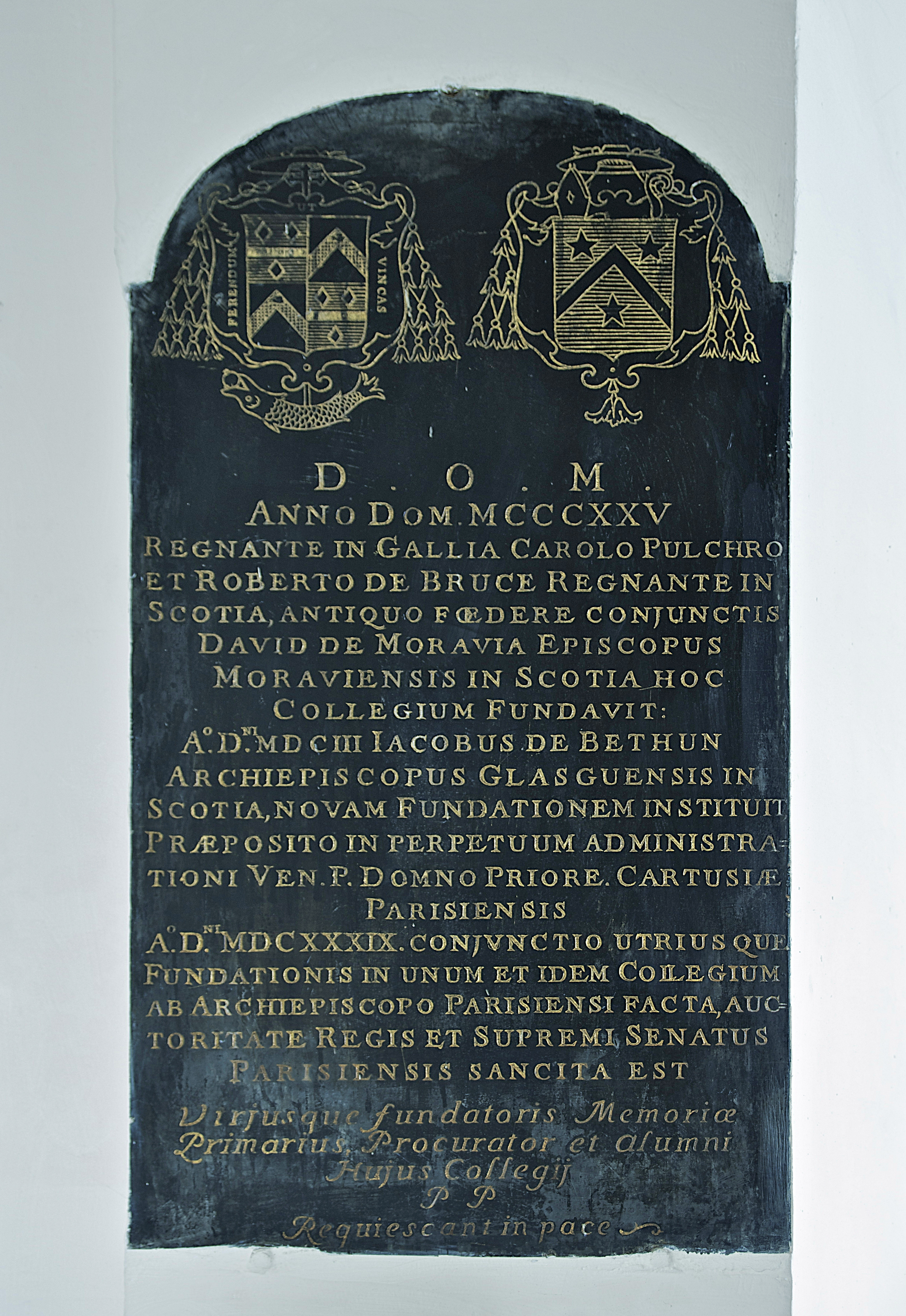
Plaque in the chapel, commemorating the history of the college

At some time not long before 1323 King Robert the Bruce of Scotland sent an embassy including the Earl of Moray and his kinsman David de Moravia (1299–1326), the Bishop of Moray, "to conclude a treaty of 'confederacy' " renewing the auld alliance between Scotland and France. A passionate benefactor of religious learning, the Bishop in 1325 endowed the lands of Grisy-Suisnes, just outside Paris to be used as a source of funds for students from his diocese studying at the University of Paris. The Collegium Scoticum came into existence in 1325 and its foundation was confirmed by King Charles IV of France in August 1326.

The Scots students were expelled from the University of Paris in 1409, during the Hundred Years' War, and did not return until 1440 following the Treaty of Arras.

The college accepted both lay and clerical students. In 1707, the minimum age for admission was fixed at fifteen, but that was often ignored. It competed with the Jesuit college to attract good students.

== Scottish Catholic refuge ==
When the Roman Catholic Church was disestablished in Scotland, the Scots College became a centre for Catholic Scots abroad and a political centre for persons who hoped to reconvert Scotland. Mary, Queen of Scots, contributed to it even from prison. Meanwhile, the college buildings at Rue des Fosses de S. Victor became a repository for many valuable Scottish state documents.

James Beaton bequeathed his property, including the archives of the Diocese of Glasgow, and a great mass of important correspondence, to the Scots College. Some of these documents had already been deposited by him in the Carthusian monastery in Paris.

Under Robert Barclay (rector from 1653 to 1682), new premises and a chapel were constructed.

Efforts to reconvert Scotland militarily and politically failed. Neither James VI & I nor his son Charles I were inclined to change religions, but the restored monarch, Charles II, converted on his deathbed and his successor, his brother, James II, was a Catholic. The Protestant English found it necessary to depose him in favour of his Protestant daughter, (alternatively he abandoned his throne, and the Convention Parliament invited) Queen Mary II, and the college once more became a centre for exiled Scottish Catholics.

"When James II. came to France he interested himself in the college, and persuaded Louis XIV., in 1688, to grant a new patent. ... This patent was registered by the Parliament, July 12th, 1688; it completely freed the college of all its debts, and gave it the official position which it had hitherto lacked."

In the last political movement of any significance raised by the Scottish Catholics, the college became a rallying point for the supporters of Prince Charles Edward Stuart (Bonnie Prince Charlie).

== French Revolution ==
During the French Revolution the people of Paris paid little respect to either Catholicism or Protestantism. Social transformation had changed paradigms entirely. The Scots College, seen as an aristocratic institution, was sacked in 1792 and many of its valuable documents were destroyed.

The building was taken for use as a prison during the Reign of Terror. Among its famous prisoners, Louis de Saint-Just was briefly imprisoned here during the revolt of Thermidor. He was rescued (equally briefly) by forces under François Hanriot before he was recaptured and executed at the guillotine.

In 1802, Napoleon issued an edict whereby the English and Scots Colleges were amalgamated into the Irish College in Paris and the Fondation Irlandais. As the United British Colleges, the foundations were separated again in 1825 by Louis XVIII.

== Modern mementos ==
One of its chapels had a bronze urn containing the brain of King James VII. After he died of a brain hemorrhage on 16 September 1701 at Saint-Germain-en-Laye his body was laid in a coffin at the Chapel of Saint Edmund in the Church of the English Benedictines in the Rue St. Jacques. However, during the French Revolution, his body was desecrated and the other remains were lost.

== Notable alumni ==
- William Ballantine
- Robert Barclay
- George Buchanan
- Seignelay Colbert de Castlehill
- James Drummond, 2nd Duke of Perth
- James Drummond, 3rd Duke of Perth
- John Drummond, 4th Duke of Perth
- Edward Drummond, 6th Duke of Perth
- John Fleming, 6th Earl of Wigtown
- Alexander Geddes
- Thomas Innes
- Alexander Macdonell
- Alexander Smith
- Charles Stewart, 5th Earl of Traquair
- John Stewart, 6th Earl of Traquair
- John Wallace

== Staff ==
=== Principals ===
- William Lumsden, 1604–uncertain date
- Under care of Robert Phillip and Alexander Pendrick until 1617.
- Alexander Pendrick, 1617–37
- David Chambers, 1637–41
- George Leith, 1641–55
- Gilbert Blackhall, 1653–53
- Robert Barclay, 1655–82
- Louis Innes, 1682–1713
- Charles Whyteford, 1713–38
- George Innes, 1738–52
- John Gordon, 1752–77
- Alexander Gordon, 1777–92

=== Prefects of Studies ===
- Robert Barclay, 1653–53
- William Ballantine, 1658–60
- Thomas Lumsden, 1660–72
- David Burnet, 1676–80
- Louis Innes, 1680–82
- Charles Whyteford, 1682–96
- George Adamson, 1697–1703
- James Paplay, 1703–04
- Thomas Innes, 1704–12; 1718–27
- Robert Gordon, 1712–18
- George Innes, 1727–35
- Alexander Gordon, 1735–37
- John McKenzie, 1738–43
- John Gordon, 1743–52
- Robert Gordon, 1753–56
- William Duthie, 1759–61
- Alexander Gordon, 1764–72
- Henry Innes, 1772–77
- Peter Hay, 1777–81
- Alexander Innes, 1781–92

== Gallery ==
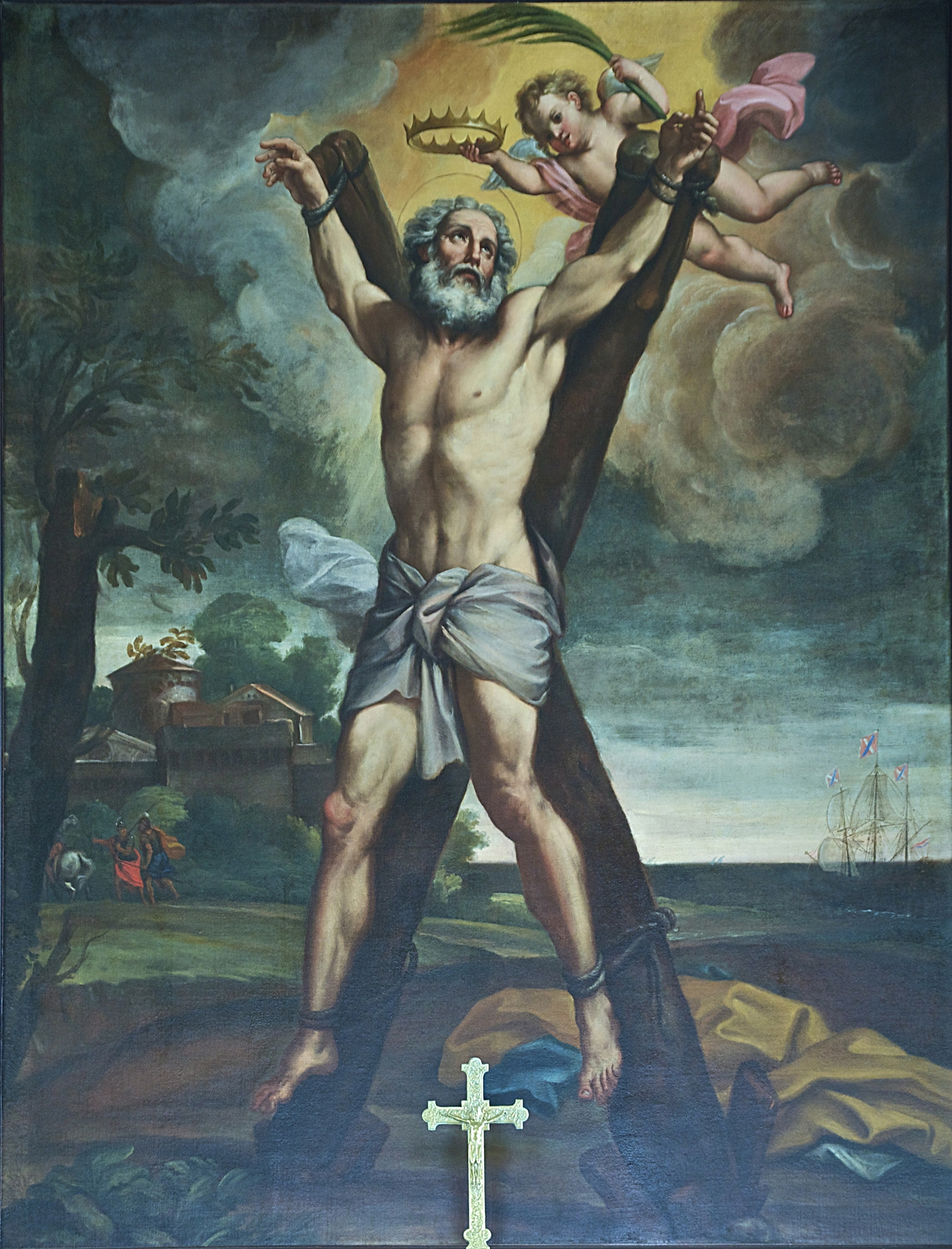
Crucifixion of Saint Andrew (17th century), above the altar of the chapel

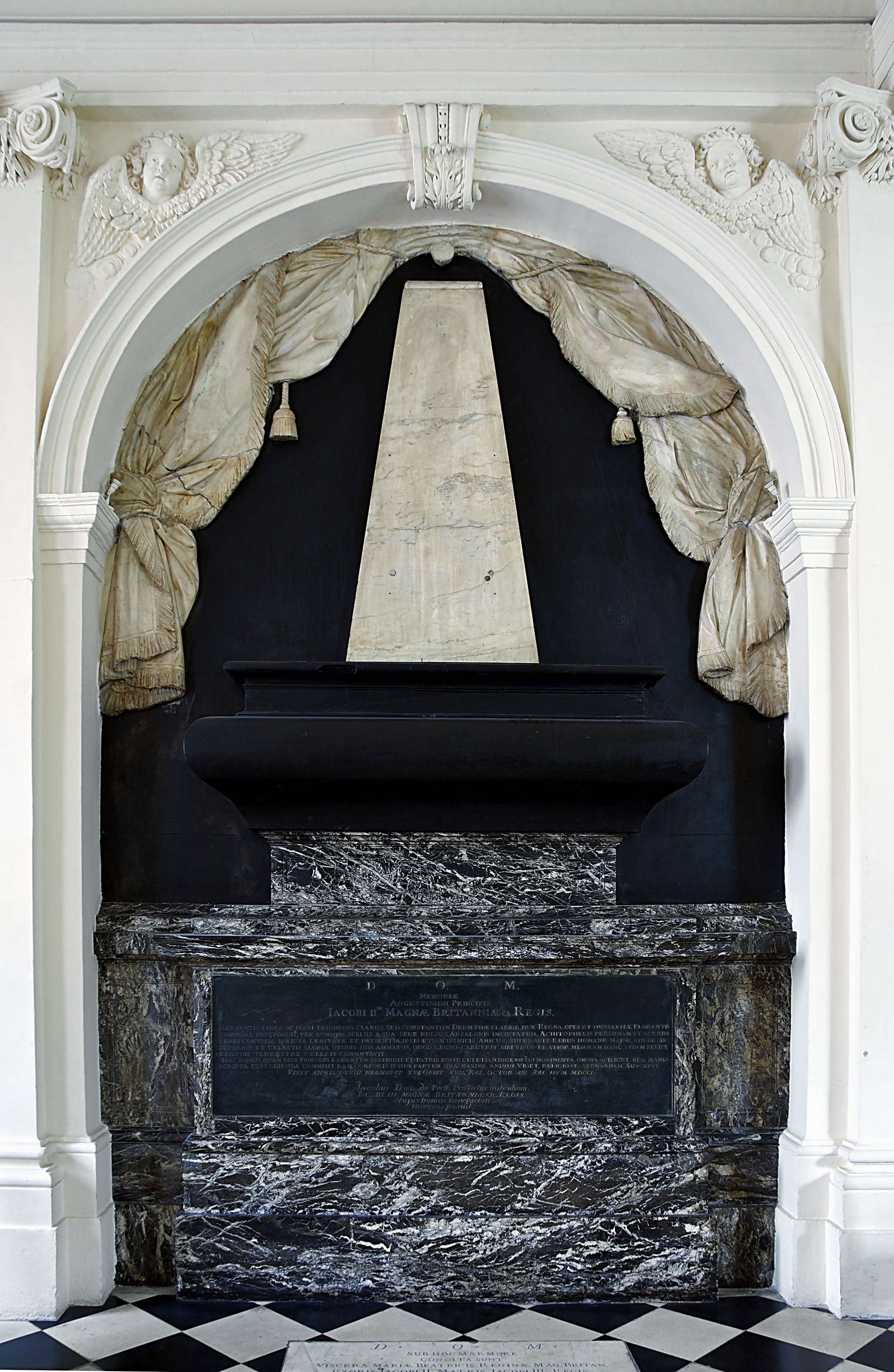
The monument to the brain of James II of England

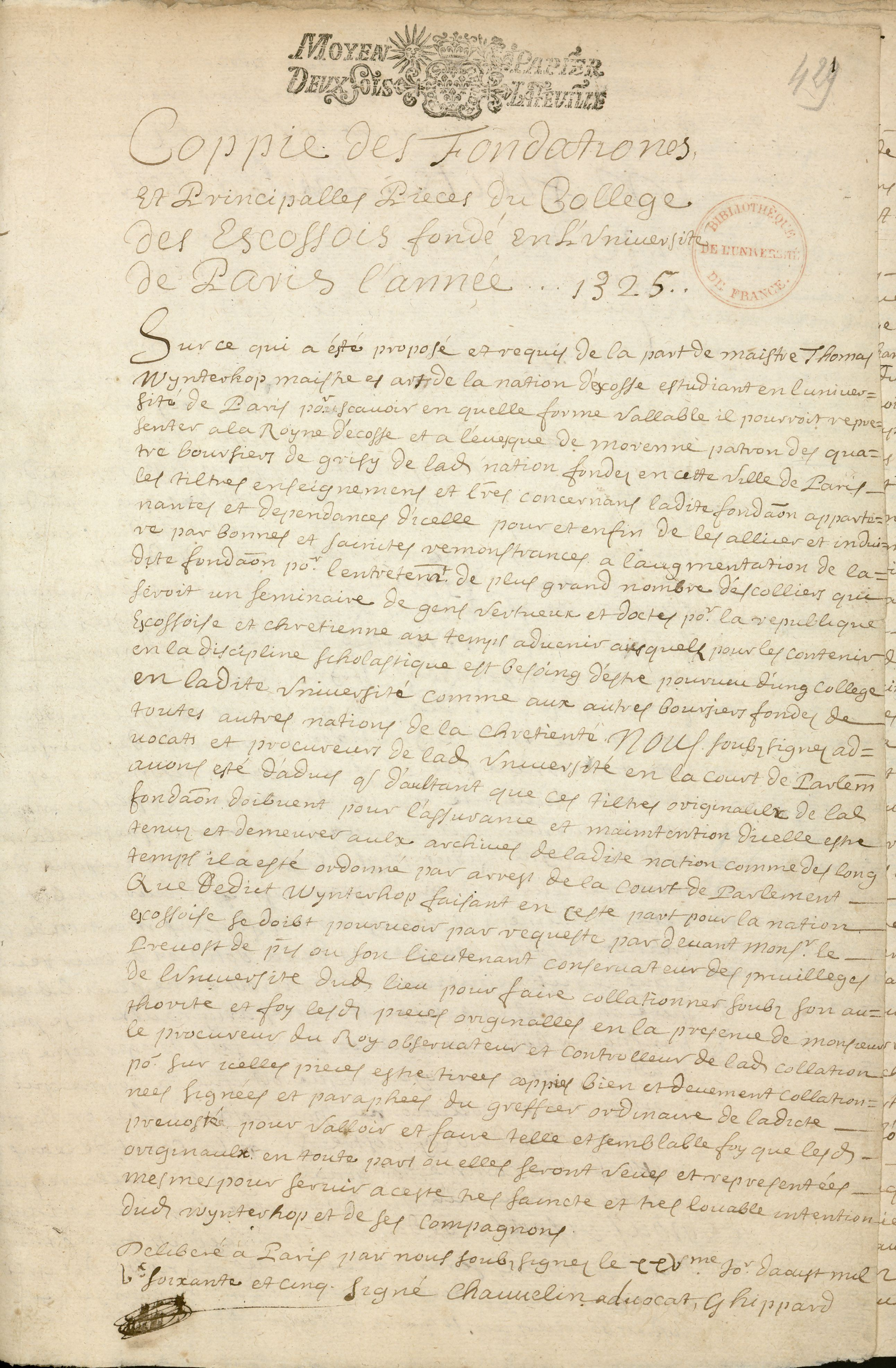
Scots College (Paris): foundation and statutes. Latin manuscript, 17th century (Bibliothèque de la Sorbonne, NuBIS)

== See also ==
- Auld Alliance
- Scots College, Douai
- Collège des Écossais, Montpellier
- Scots College (disambiguation)

== Bibliography ==
- Grant, Sir Alexander (1884). The Story of the University of Edinburgh During Its First Three Hundred Years Volume I. London: Longmans, Green and Co.

== See also ==
- Irish College in Paris
- Scots College Rome
- Royal Scots College, Salamanca, Spain
