= Camera Obscura, Edinburgh =

Tourist attraction in Scotland

Coordinates: 55.9490°N 3.1956°W

Camera Obscura & World of Illusions

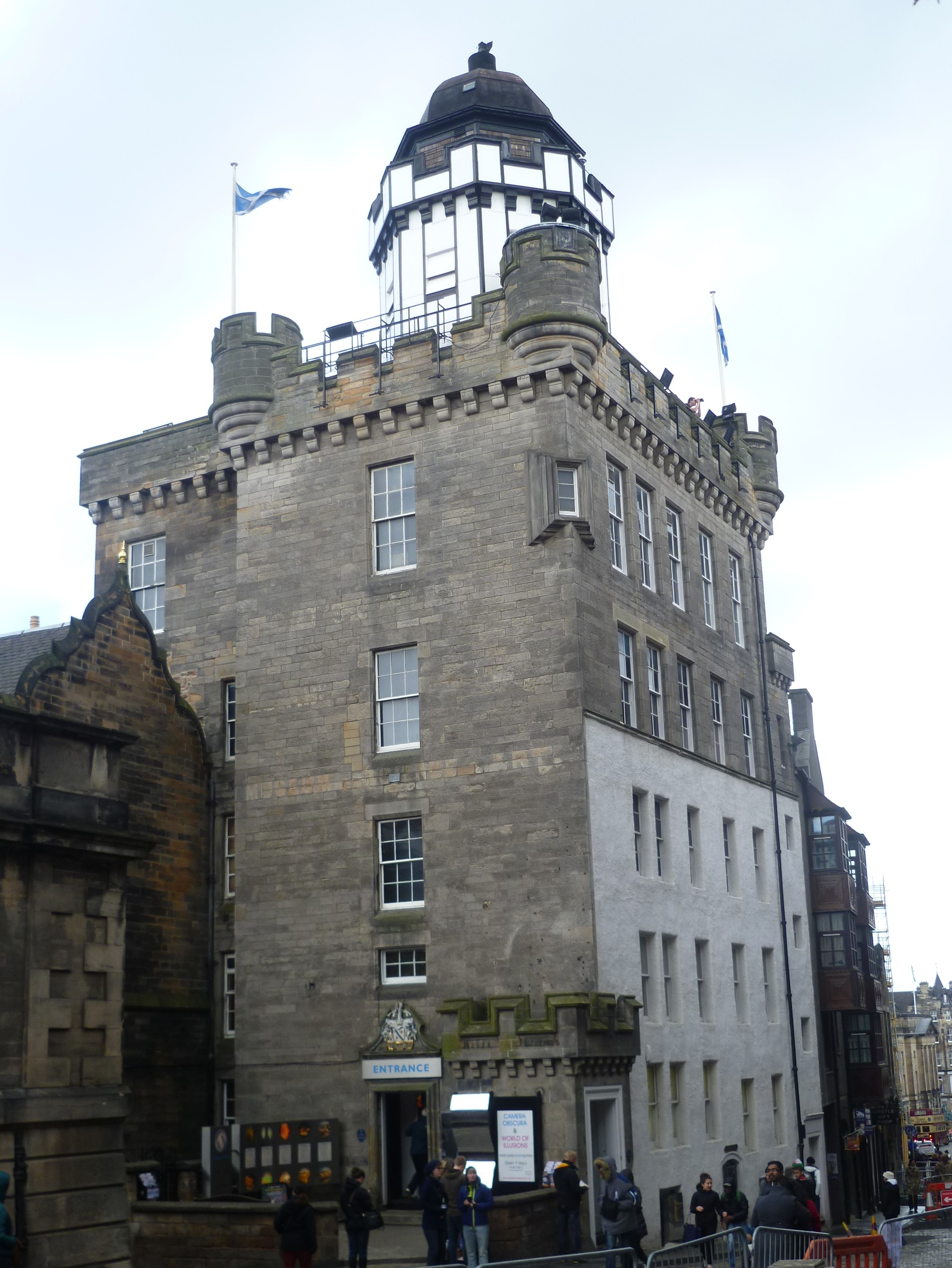
- Outlook Tower viewed from the Royal Mile
- Former names: Short's Observatory (1853); The Outlook Tower
- Established: 1853 (original attraction); 1977 (modern attraction)
- Location: 549 Castlehill, The Royal Mile, Edinburgh EH1 2ND, Scotland
- Visitors: 331,881 (2024)
- Founder: Maria Short
- Owner: Visitor Centres Ltd.
- Public transit access: Edinburgh Waverley
- Website: www.camera-obscura.co.uk

Listed Building – Category A
- Official name: 549 Castlehill, Outlook Tower
- Designated: 12 December 1970
- Reference no.: LB28488

Camera Obscura & World of Illusions is a tourist attraction located in Outlook Tower on the Castlehill section of the Royal Mile close to Edinburgh Castle. The original attraction was founded by entrepreneur Maria Theresa Short in 1835 and was exhibited on Calton Hill. Outlook Tower has been a museum since the late 1890s and is currently home to many interactive exhibits, including the original camera obscura.

== History ==
=== Short's Observatory ===
In the early 18th century, the Edinburgh instrument maker Thomas Short leased some land on Calton Hill to display his instruments to the public. As his lease stipulated female relatives of Thomas could not inherit the building and its contents, his wife and children did not inherit it when he died in 1788. In 1827, Maria Theresa Short returned to Edinburgh from the West Indies claiming to be Thomas Short’s daughter and attempted to claim his "Great Telescope" for her inheritance. Despite strong competition from other parties, she received the telescope and set up "Short's Popular Observatory" in 1835, housed in a wooden and stone building next to the National Monument on Calton Hill. She exhibited many scientific instruments and kept her Observatory open till 9pm each evening.

After this very popular observatory was pulled down by authorities against her protests in 1851, she moved to Castlehill. In 1852, she bought the Laird of Cockpen’s townhouse, adding two storeys to create Short's Observatory, Museum of Science and Art, in existence from 1853 to 1892. The tenement is thought to be the original mansion of the Ramsays of Dalhousie (the "Lairds of Cockpen"), turned into small flats in the 18th century. The main attraction in "Short's Observatory" was the camera obscura occupying the topmost room. Her husband, Robert Henderson, continued to run the attraction after Maria died in 1869.

=== Outlook Tower ===
In 1892, Patrick Geddes, a pioneering Scottish urban planner, sociologist, and ecologist, assumed management of the site, renamed it the "Outlook Tower," and organized it as a museum and urban study centre demonstrating his philosophy of planning, which was based on comprehensive surveys of the site, city, and region. He installed a series of exhibits on progressively broader geographic themes as one ascended the tower — first the world on the ground floor, then Europe, the English-speaking countries, Scotland, and Edinburgh — with the camera obscura itself continuing to project a real-time image of the city at the very top. People from all walks of life were invited to come to the tower to study and learn about their city.

The museum closed after Geddes' death in 1932. It was purchased by the University of Edinburgh in 1966 as the home for a proposed Patrick Geddes Centre and archive, but the project was greatly scaled back after the University closed its regional planning department. In 1982, the building was sold to a private owner, though a one-room Geddes exhibit remained on the fourth floor.

== The Tower today: Camera Obscura and World of Illusions ==
The tower, with its six floors of interactive exhibitions, is still open to the public, making it the oldest purpose-built attraction in the city, and one of the oldest in the United Kingdom. Nowadays there are passing references to Maria Short and Patrick Geddes in the presentation on the top floor where the Camera Obscura is still in use to project a "virtual" tour of the city for visitors, and also on the rooftop terrace with its views of Edinburgh and telescopes. The floors beneath the Camera Obscura hold the "World of Illusions", which offers interactive exhibits demonstrating aspects of optical illusions, light, colour. There are also puzzles, a mirror maze, and a vortex tunnel. Although the project is primarily a tourist attraction, it also serves as a learning centre about optical illusions, holograms, the origins of photography and about Edinburgh itself.

Camera Obscura in Edinburgh

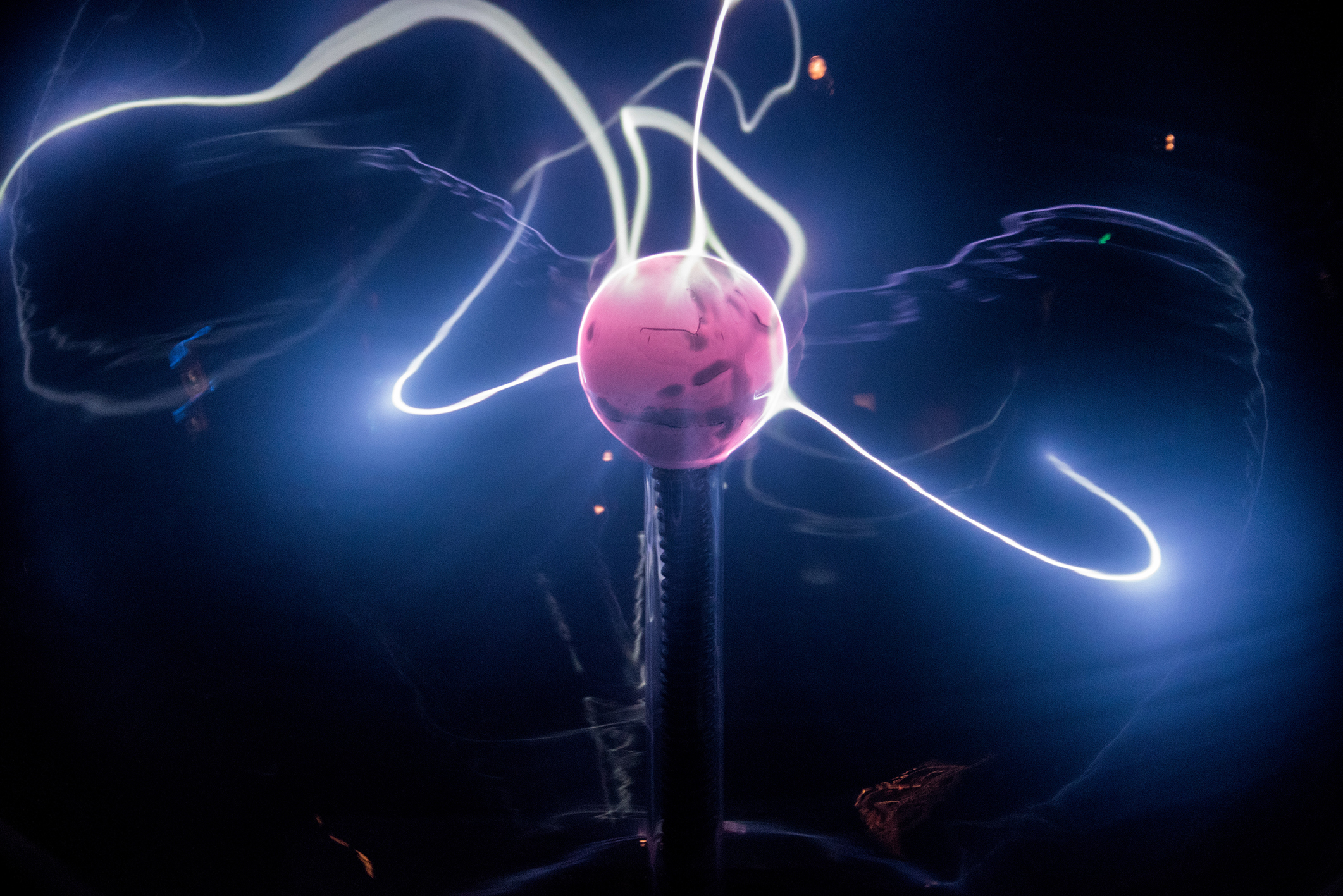

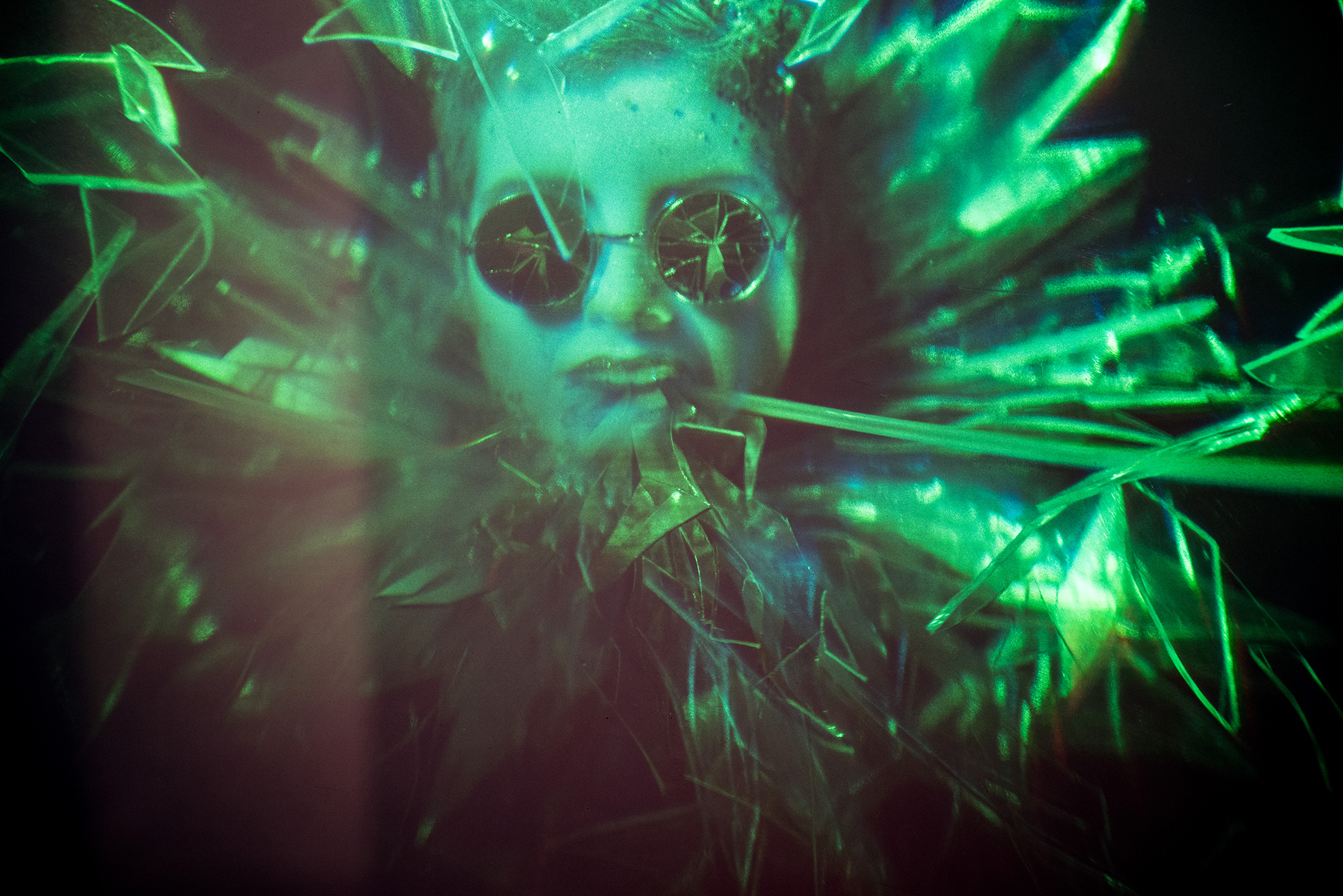

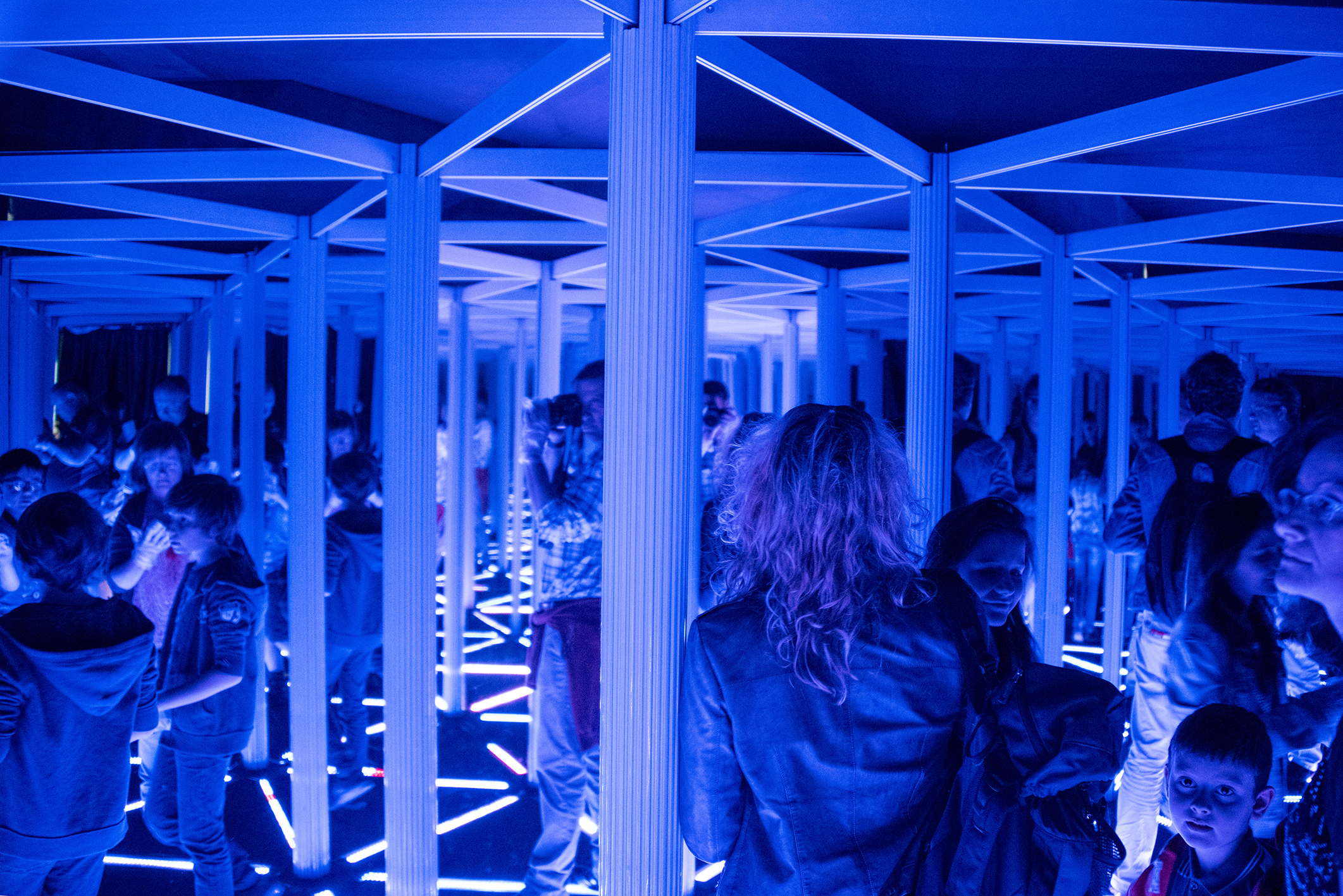

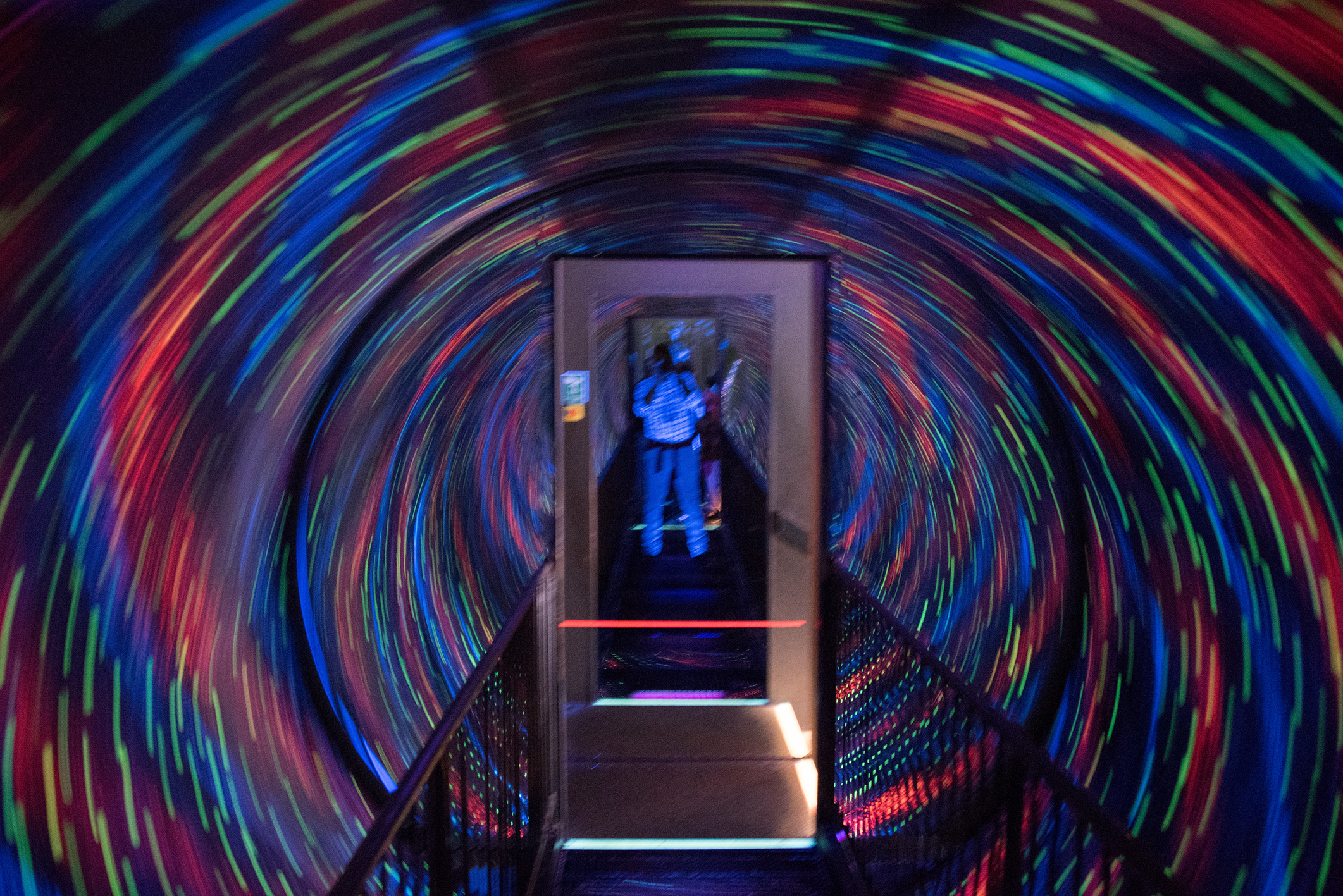

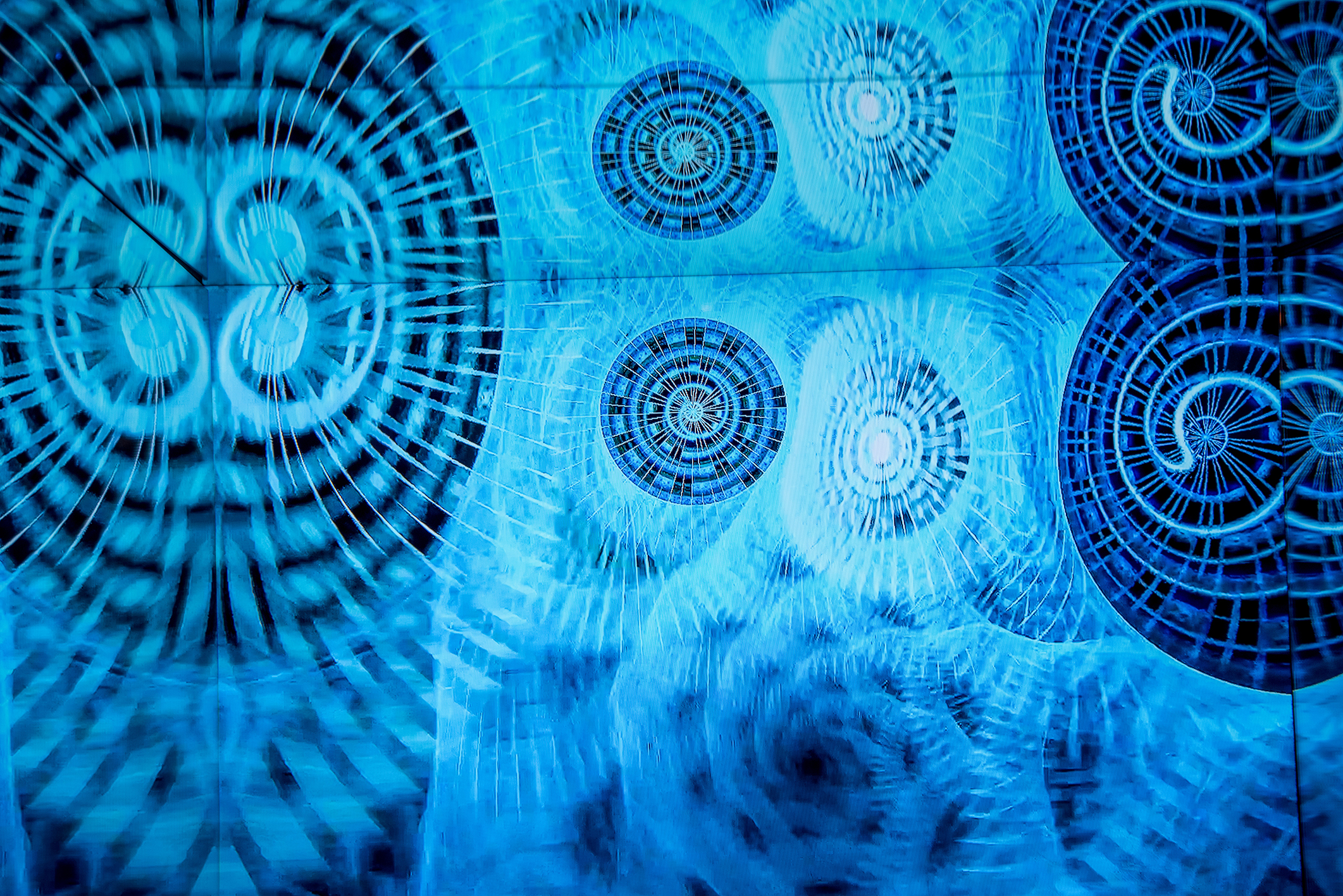

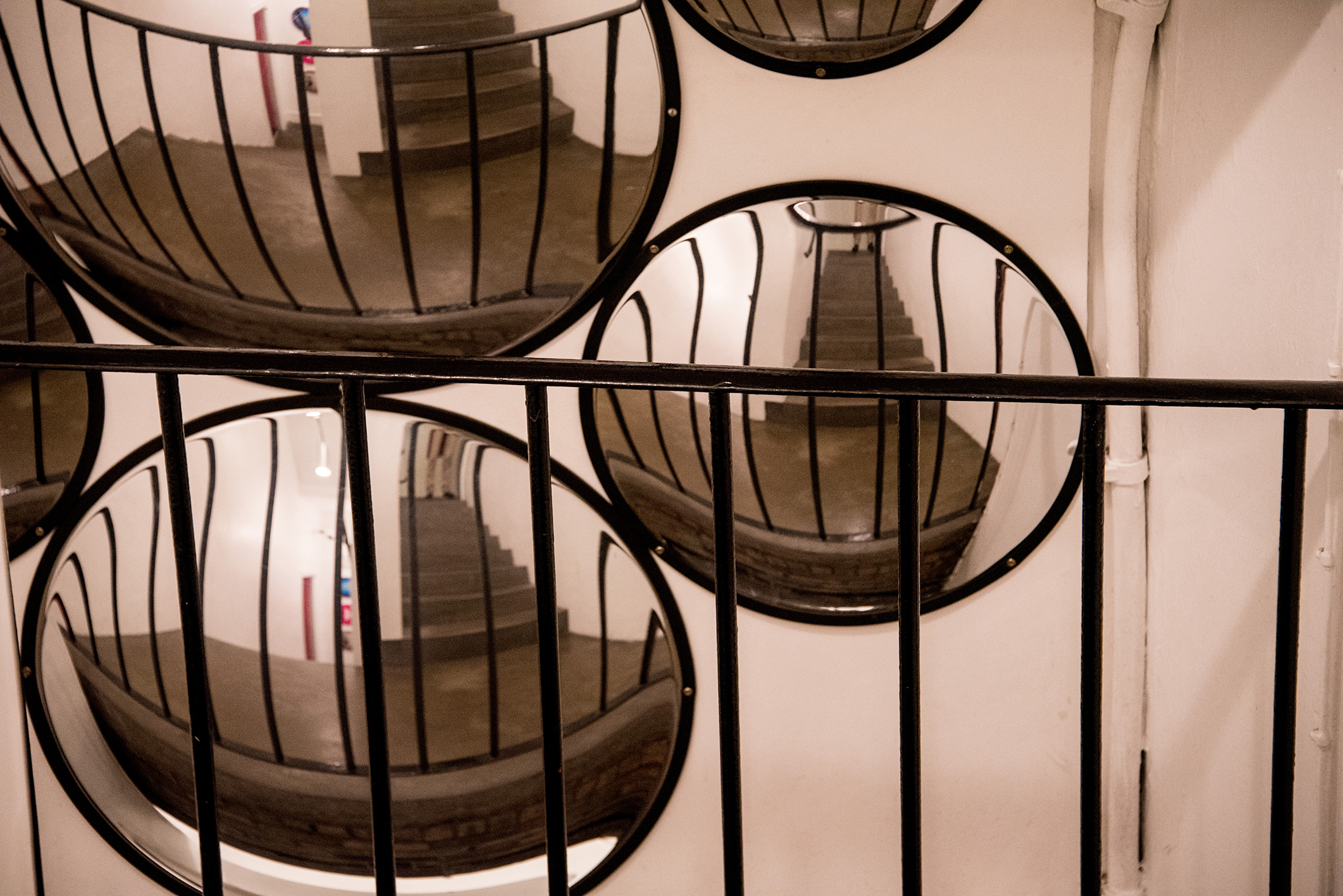

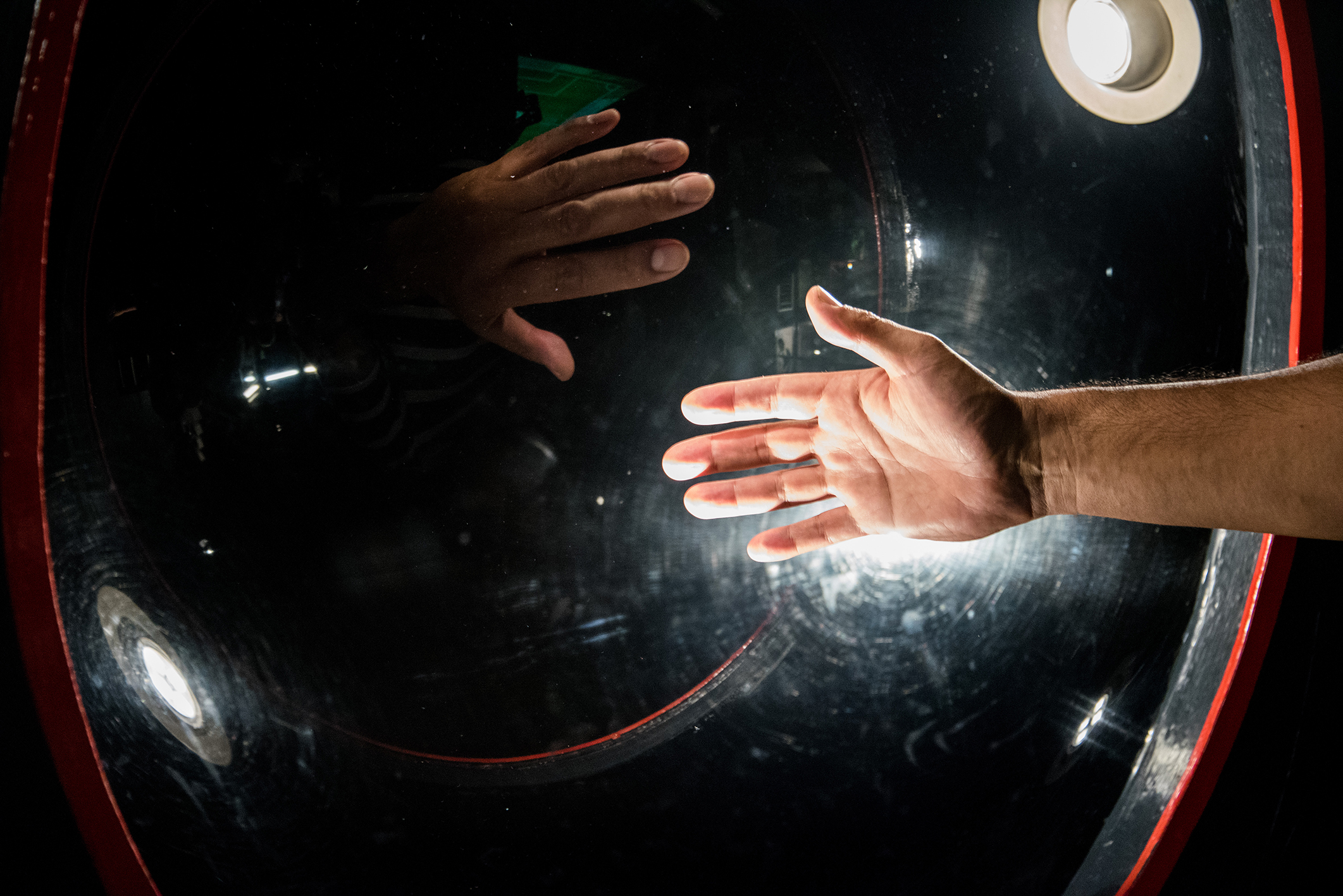

Clip of Sparkling light effects at the Camera Obscura, Edinburgh.

== Other Outlook Towers and Camera Obscuras ==
The concept of the Outlook Tower was tried elsewhere. When at the age of 70 Patrick Geddes moved to Montpellier, France where he bought land on a hill with a view over the city, built a house and incorporated another Outlook Tower. The house became the Scots College (Collège des Écossais). There is a working camera obscura tower (the Clifton Observatory) in Bristol, England, also others at Aberystwyth in Wales and at Kirriemuir, Dumfries and Cairngorm Mountain, Scotland.

== See also ==
- Observatory, Bristol
- Collège des Écossais, Montpellier
