= Patrick Geddes =

Scottish scientist and town planner (1854–1932)

Sir Patrick Geddes FRSE
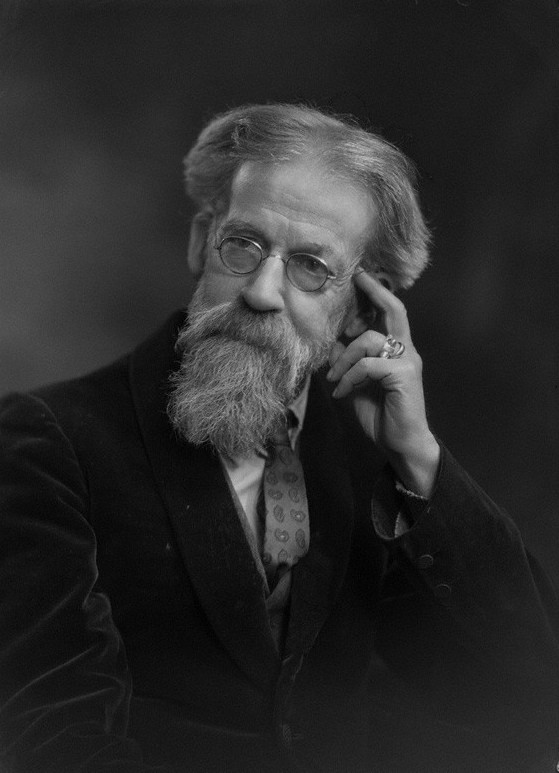
- Geddes in 1931
- Born: 2 October 1854; Ballater, Aberdeenshire, Scotland
- Died: 17 April 1932 (aged 77); Scots College, Montpellier, France
- Education: Royal School of Mines
- Known for: Urban planning and the term conurbation
- Spouse: Anna Geddes
- Children: Norah Geddes
- Scientific career
- Fields: Sociology, urban planning, biology
- Workplaces: Lecturer in Zoology, University of Edinburgh (1880–1888); Professor of Botany, University College, Dundee (1888–1919); Professor of Civics & Sociology, Bombay University, India (1920–1923)
- Patrons: John Sinclair, 1st Baron Pentland

Signature
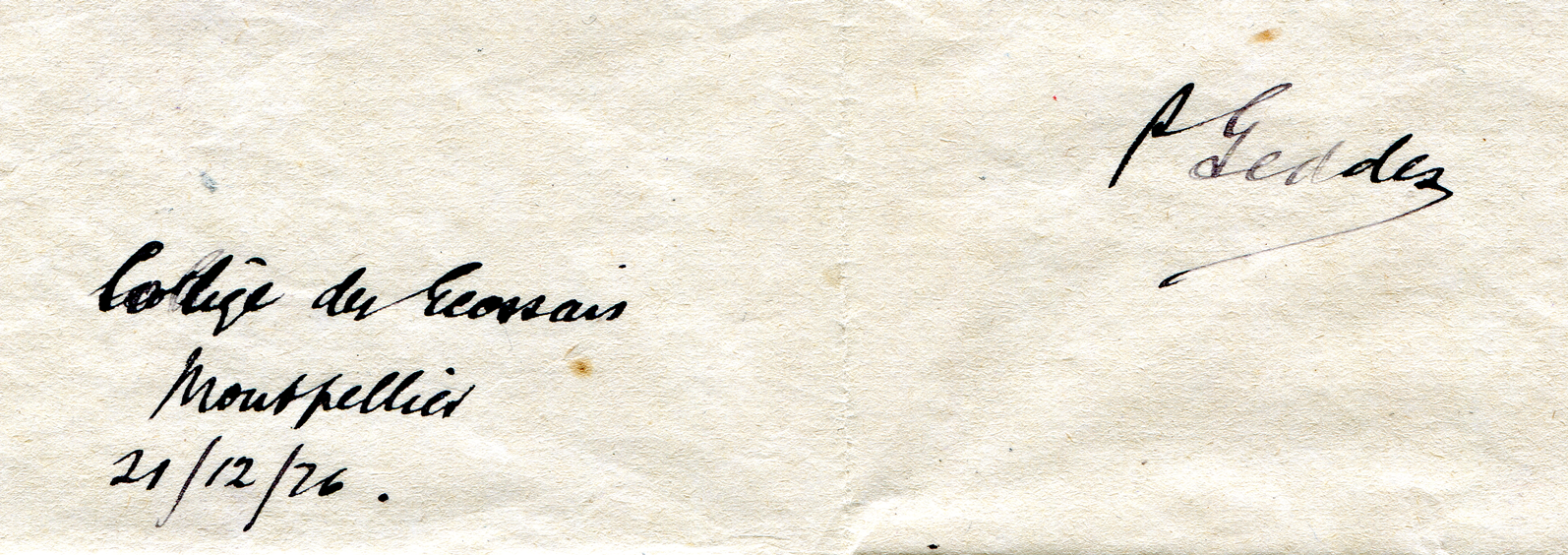

Notes
- Fellow of the Royal Society of Edinburgh (1880); Co-founder of the University of Bombay; Co-founder of the Sociological Society; Founder of the Edinburgh Social Union; Founder of the Franco-Scottish Society; Planned the Hebrew University at Jerusalem; Founder of the Collège des Écossais in Montpellier (1924)

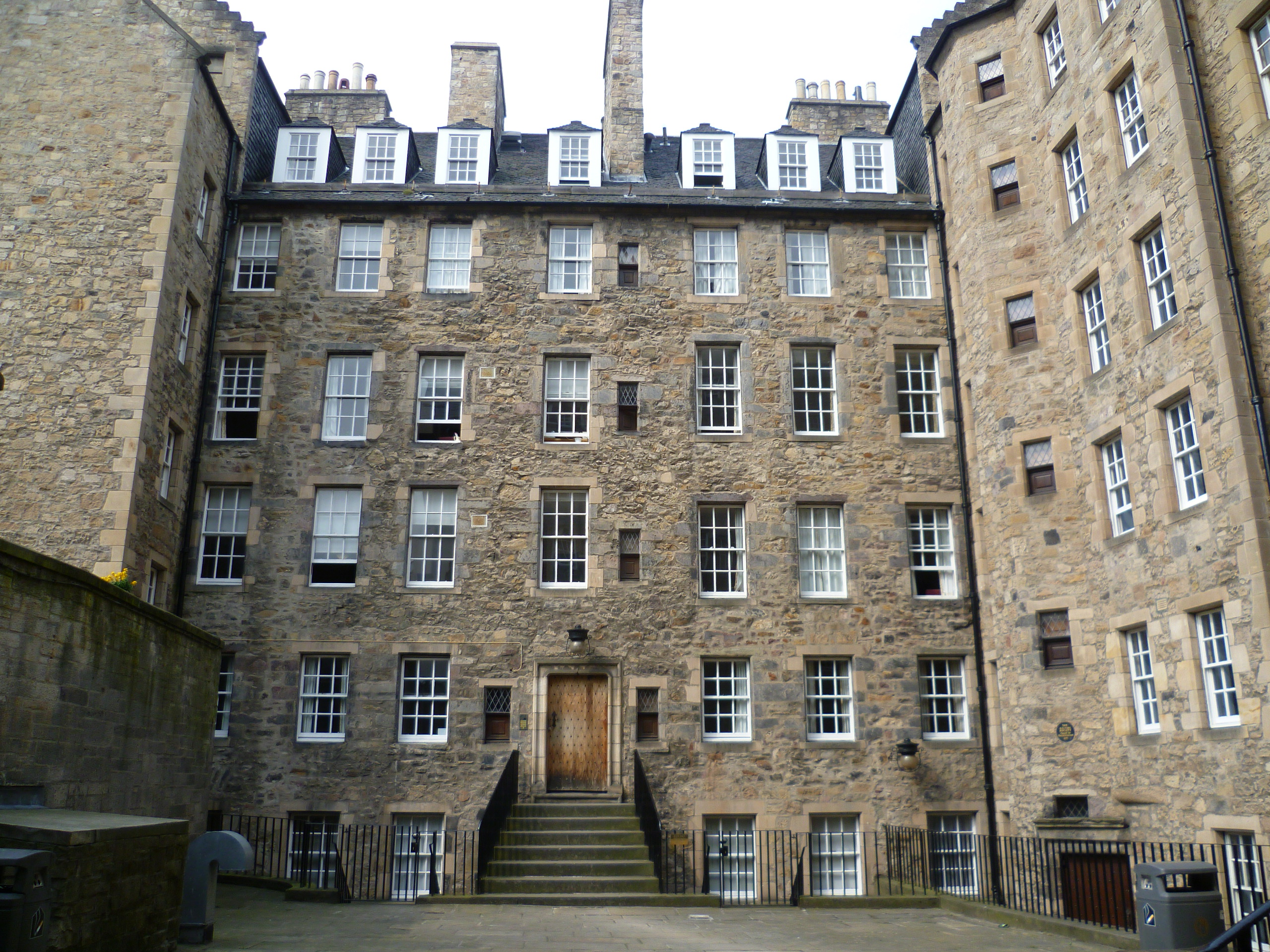
Milne's Court (1690), Edinburgh. Under the influence of the pioneering conservationist, Patrick Geddes, these buildings were renovated in 1914, becoming a university hall of residence.

Sir Patrick Geddes FRSE (/ˈɡɛdiːz/; 2 October 1854 – 17 April 1932) was a Scottish biologist, sociologist, Comtean positivist, geographer, philanthropist and pioneering town planner. He is known for his innovative thinking in the fields of urban planning and sociology.

Following the philosophies of Auguste Comte and Frederic Le Play, he introduced the concept of "region" to architecture and planning and coined the term "conurbation". Later, he elaborated "neotechnics" as the way of remaking a world apart from over-commercialization and money dominance.

An energetic Francophile, Geddes was the founder in 1924 of the Collège des Écossais (Scots College), an international teaching establishment in Montpellier, France, and in the 1920s he bought the Château d'Assas to set up a centre for urban studies.

== Biography ==
The son of Janet Stevenson and soldier Alexander Geddes, Patrick Geddes was born in Ballater and the Old Parish Register for baptisms in the parish of Glenmuick Tullich and Glengairn recorded his first name as 'Peter'. He was educated in Aberdeenshire, and at Perth Academy. His extraordinary capacity for work became evident in early life.

He studied at the Royal College of Mines in London under Thomas Henry Huxley between 1874 and 1877, never finishing any degree, and he then spent the year 1877–1878 as a demonstrator in the Department of Physiology in University College London where he met Charles Darwin in Burdon-Sanderson's laboratory. While in London, he became acquainted with Comtean Positivism, as promoted by Richard Congreve, and he converted to the Religion of Humanity. He was elected as a member of the London Positivist Society. Later he raised his children to worship 'Humanity' following the Positivist system of belief. He lectured in Zoology at Edinburgh University from 1880 to 1888.

From 1888 to 1918, Geddes worked as the Professor of Botany at University College Dundee.

He married Anna Morton (1857–1917), who was the daughter of a wealthy merchant, in 1886 when he was 32 years old. They had three children: Norah, Alasdair and Arthur. During a visit to India in 1917, Anna fell ill with typhoid fever and died, not knowing that their son Alasdair had been killed in action in France. Their daughter was the landscape designer Norah Geddes, who was active in Geddes's Open Spaces projects; she married the architect and planner Frank Charles Mears.

In 1890, he assisted John Wilson in laying out a teaching garden at Morgan Academy in Dundee.

Between 1894 and 1914, he served as an active member of the ruling Council of the Cockburn Association, a campaigning conservation organisation founded in Edinburgh in 1875.

In 1895, Geddes published an edition of The Evergreen magazine, with articles on nature, biology and poetics. Artists Robert Burns and John Duncan provided illustrations for the magazine.

Geddes wrote with J. Arthur Thomson an early book on The Evolution of Sex (1889). He held the Chair of Botany at University College Dundee from 1888 to 1919, and the Chair of Sociology at the University of Bombay from 1919 to 1924. He inspired Victor Branford to form the Sociological Society in 1903 to promote his sociological views.

While he thought of himself primarily as a sociologist, it was his commitment to close social observation and ability to turn these into practical solutions for city design and improvement that earned him a "revered place amongst the founding fathers of the British town planning movement". He was a major influence on the American urban theorist Lewis Mumford.

He was knighted in 1932, shortly before his death at the Scots College in Montpellier, France on 17 April 1932.

== Social and urban theory ==
=== Influences ===
Patrick Geddes was influenced by social theorists such as Auguste Comte (1798–1857), Herbert Spencer (1820–1903), and French theorist Frederic Le Play (1806–1882) and expanded upon earlier theoretical developments that led to the concept of regional planning.

He was a proponent of the Comte - Le Play view of the interconnectedness of city region as a potentially autonomous unit. He adopted Spencer's theory that the concept of biological evolution could be applied to explain the evolution of society, and drew on Le Play's analysis of the key units of society as constituting "Lieu, Travail, Famille" ("Place, Work, Family"), but changing the last from "family" to "folk". In this theory, the family is viewed as the central "biological unit of human society" from which all else develops. According to Geddes, it is from "stable, healthy homes" providing the necessary conditions for mental and moral development that come beautiful and healthy children who are able "to fully participate in life".

Geddes drew on Le Play's circular theory of geographical locations presenting environmental limitations and opportunities that in turn determine the nature of work. His central argument was that physical geography, market economics and anthropology were related, yielding a "single chord of social life [of] all three combined". Thus the interdisciplinary subject of sociology was developed into the science of "man's interaction with a natural environment: the basic technique was the regional survey, and the improvement of town planning the chief practical application of sociology".

=== Key ideas ===
Geddes' writing demonstrates the influence of these ideas on his theories of the city. He saw the city as a series of common interlocking patterns, "an inseparably interwoven structure", akin to a flower. He criticised the tendency of modern scientific thinking to specialisation. In his "Report to the H.H. the Maharaja of Kapurthala" in 1917 he wrote:

"Each of the various specialists remains too closely concentrated upon his single specialism, too little awake to those of the others. Each sees clearly and seizes firmly upon one petal of the six-lobed flower of life and tears it apart from the whole."

These ideas can also be traced back to Geddes' abiding interest in Eastern philosophy which he believed more readily conceived of "life as a whole": "as a result, civic beauty in India has existed at all levels, from humble homes and simple shrines to palaces magnificent and temples sublime."

Geddes distinguished two forms of human social life: ‘paleotechnic’ and ‘neotechnic.’ He viewed the former as self-destructive but the latter as self-supporting. In the context of cities, paleotechnic cities are those characterized by competition while neotechnic is characterized by interaction. Additionally, this is followed by the paleotechnic city's desire for expansion as compared to the neotechnic city's ability to form communities and conurbations. Geddes attributed the destruction of cities via World War I not to the invasion of imperialist powers but the prevalence of paleotechnic forms of life in European society.

Against a backdrop of extraordinary development of new technologies, industrialisation and urbanism, Geddes witnessed the substantial social consequences of crime, illness and poverty that developed as a result of modernisation. From Geddes' perspective, the purpose of his theory and understanding of relationships among the units of society was to find an equilibrium among people and the environment to improve such conditions.

== Early career in Scotland – development and application of concepts ==
=== Planning and relationship between humans and built environment ===
==== The local plan – "conservative surgery" versus the gridiron plan ====
Geddes championed a mode of planning that sought to consider "primary human needs" in every intervention, engaging in "constructive and conservative surgery" rather than the "heroic, all of a piece schemes" popular in the nineteenth and early twentieth centuries. He continued to use and advocate for this approach throughout his career.

Very early on in his career Geddes demonstrated the practicality of his ideas and approach. In 1886 Geddes and his wife, Anna Geddes, purchased a row of slum tenements in James Court, Edinburgh, making it into a single dwelling. In and around this area Geddes commenced upon a project of "conservative surgery": "weeding out the worst of the houses that surrounded them…widening the narrow closes into courtyards" and thus improving sunlight and airflow. The best of the houses were kept and restored. Geddes believed that this approach was both more economical and more humane.

In this way Geddes consciously worked against the tradition of the "gridiron plan", resurgent in colonial town design in the 19th century:

"The heritage of the gridiron plans goes back at least to the Roman camps. The basis for the grid as an enduring and appealing urban form rests on five main characteristics: order and regulatory, orientation in space and to elements, simplicity and ease of navigation, speed of layout, and adaptability to circumstance".

However, he wished this policy of "sweeping clearances" to be recognised for what he believed it was: "one of the most disastrous and pernicious blunders in the chequered history of sanitation".

Geddes criticised this tradition as much for its "dreary conventionality" as for its failure to address in the long term the very problems it purport to solve. According to Geddes' analysis, this approach was not only "unsparing to the old homes and to the neighbourhood life of the area" but also, in "leaving fewer housing sites and these mostly narrower than before" expelling a large population that would "again as usual, be driven to create worse congestion in other quarters".

==== The regional plan – Valley Section ====
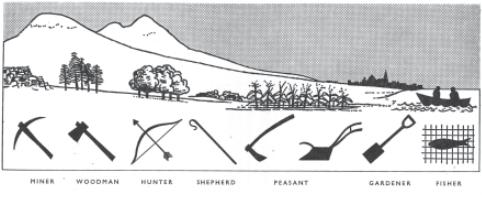
Patrick Geddes, Valley Section, 1909

In 1909, Geddes assisted in the early planning of the southern aspect of the Zoological Gardens in Edinburgh. This work was formative in his development of a regional planning model called the "Valley Section".This model illustrated the complex interactions among biogeography, geomorphology and human systems and attempted to demonstrate how "natural occupations" such as hunting, mining, or fishing are supported by physical geographies that in turn determine patterns of human settlement. The point of this model was to make clear the complex and interrelated relationships between humans and their environment, and to encourage regional planning models that would be responsive to these conditions.

=== Pioneering civic participation ===
==== The "observational technique" ====
Drawing on the scientific method, Geddes encouraged close observation as the way to discover and work with the relationships among place, work and folk. In 1892, to allow the general public an opportunity to observe these relationships, Geddes opened a "sociological laboratory" called the Outlook Tower that documented and visualized the regional landscape. In keeping with scientific process and using new technologies, Geddes developed an Index Museum to categorise his physical observations and maintained Encyclopedia Graphicato, which used a camera obscura to provide an opportunity for the general public to observe their own landscape to witness the relationships among units of society. Geddes would host tours throughout the tower and boast its maps, photographs, and projection via ‘camera obscura’ in order to present the sociological dimensions of cities, urban problems, and town planning. During his tours he would use the camera obscura on the top floor to demonstrate the outlook of an artist then take visitors to the balcony to show the outlook of technical professionals like geologists, geographers, etc. He used specific instruments and tools to better convey the outlook different people had of the region. The Outlook Tower is a physical assertion of Geddes belief in the importance of all areas of knowledge; all arts, all sciences, all religions, all cultures, etc. The Outlook Tower embodies the integration of local, the regional, and the global aspects of knowledge. Geddes used it as a tool for cultural and regional analysis and provided space for many thinkers to explore the idea of 'regions' which he later introduced to the field of planning. The Outlook Tower is located in Edinburgh's Old Town and still exists today as Camera Obscura & World of Illusions.

==== The "civic survey" ====
Geddes advocated the civic survey as indispensable to urban planning: his motto was "diagnosis before treatment". Such a survey should include, at a minimum, the geology, the geography, the climate, the economic life, and the social institutions of the city and region. His early work surveying the city of Edinburgh became a model for later surveys.

He was particularly critical of that form of planning which relied overmuch on design and effect, neglecting to consider "the surrounding quarter and constructed without reference to local needs or potentialities". Geddes encouraged instead exploration and consideration of the "whole set of existing conditions", studying the "place as it stands, seeking out how it has grown to be what it is, and recognising alike its advantages, its difficulties and its defects":

"This school strives to adapt itself to meet the wants and needs, the ideas and ideals of the place and persons concerned. It seeks to undo as little as possible, while planning to increase the well-being of the people at all levels, from the humblest to the highest."

In this sense he can be viewed as prefiguring the work of seminal urban thinkers such as Jane Jacobs, and region-specific planning movements such as New Urbanism, encouraging the planner to consider the situation, inherent virtue and potential in a given site, rather than "an abstract ideal that could be imposed by authority or force from the outside".

==== Civic pageant ====
Geddes developed a means for engaging with the populace of a city through a civic pageant. One such was the Masque of Learning, a pageant he organised in the Poole's Synod Hall, Edinburgh in 1912. He also organised a pageant in Indore, India when he arrived in 1917.

== Later career abroad – large-scale projects ==
=== Work in India ===
Geddes' work in improving the slums of Edinburgh led to an invitation from Lord Pentland (then Governor of Madras) to travel to India to advise on emerging urban planning issues, in particular, how to mediate "between the need for public improvement and respect for existing social standards". For this, Geddes prepared an exhibition on "City and Town Planning". The materials for the first exhibit were sent to India on a ship that was sunk near Madras by the German ship Emden, however new materials were collected and an exhibit prepared for the Senate hall of Madras University by 1915.

Once arriving in India, Geddes toured multiple Indian cities and was overwhelmed by Indian architecture and planning. Geddes was impressed by the historical piety valued in Indian planning displayed by the seamless merger of traditional temples within the urban fabric of Indian cities. Geddes believed that this was indicative of a city's genius loci which is often established by a visually dominant building in a city like a medieval cathedral or an antique temple in the urban fabric. Geddes was outspoken in his town-planning reports about the “insensitivity of British colonial administration towards the historic Indian architecture and urban environment” and denounced their methods of planning which included drastic and destructive changes to the urban fabric.

According to some reports, this was near the time of the meeting of the Indian National Congress and Pentland hoped the exhibit would demonstrate the benefits of British rule. Geddes lectured and worked with Indian surveyors and travelled to Bombay and Bengal where Pentland's political allies Lord Willingdon and Lord Carmichael were Governors. He held a position in Sociology and Civics at Bombay University from 1919 to 1925.

Between 1915 and 1919 Geddes wrote a series of "exhaustive town planning reports" on at least eighteen Indian cities, a selection of which has been collected together in Jacqueline Tyrwhitt's Patrick Geddes in India (1947).

Through these reports, Geddes was concerned to create a "working system in India", righting the wrongs of the past by making interventions in and plans for the urban fabric that were both considerate of local context and tradition and awake to the need for development. According to Lewis Mumford, writing in introduction to Tyrwhitt's collected reports:

"Few observers have shown more sympathy…with the religious and social practices of the Hindus than Geddes did; yet no one could have written more scathingly of Mahatma Gandhi's attempt to conserve the past by reverting to the spinning wheel, at a moment when the fundamental poverty of the masses in India called for the most resourceful application of the machine both to agricultural and industrial life."

His principles for town planning in Bombay demonstrate his views on the relationship between social processes and spatial form, and the intimate and causal connections between the social development of the individual and the cultural and physical environment. They included: ("What town planning means under the Bombay Town Planning Act of 1915")

- Preservation of human life and energy, rather than superficial beautification.
- Conformity to an orderly development plan carried out in stages.
- Purchasing land suitable for building.
- Promoting trade and commerce.
- Preserving historic buildings and buildings of religious significance.
- Developing a city worthy of civic pride, not an imitation of European cities.
- Promoting the happiness, health and comfort of all residents, rather than focusing on roads and parks available only to the rich.
- Control over future growth with adequate provision for future requirements.

Geddes' exhortation to pay attention to the social and particular when attempting city renewal or resettlement remains relevant, particularly in light of the plans for slum resettlement and redevelopment ongoing in many Indian cities (see, e.g. Dharavi redevelopment program):

"Town Planning is not mere place-planning, nor even work planning. If it is to be successful it must be folk planning. This means that its task is not to coerce people into new places against their associations, wishes, and interest, as we find bad schemes trying to do. Instead its task is to find the right places for each sort of people; place where they will really flourish. To give people in fact the same care that we give when transplanting flowers, instead of harsh evictions and arbitrary instructions to 'move on', delivered in the manner of an officious policeman."

=== Work in historic Palestine ===
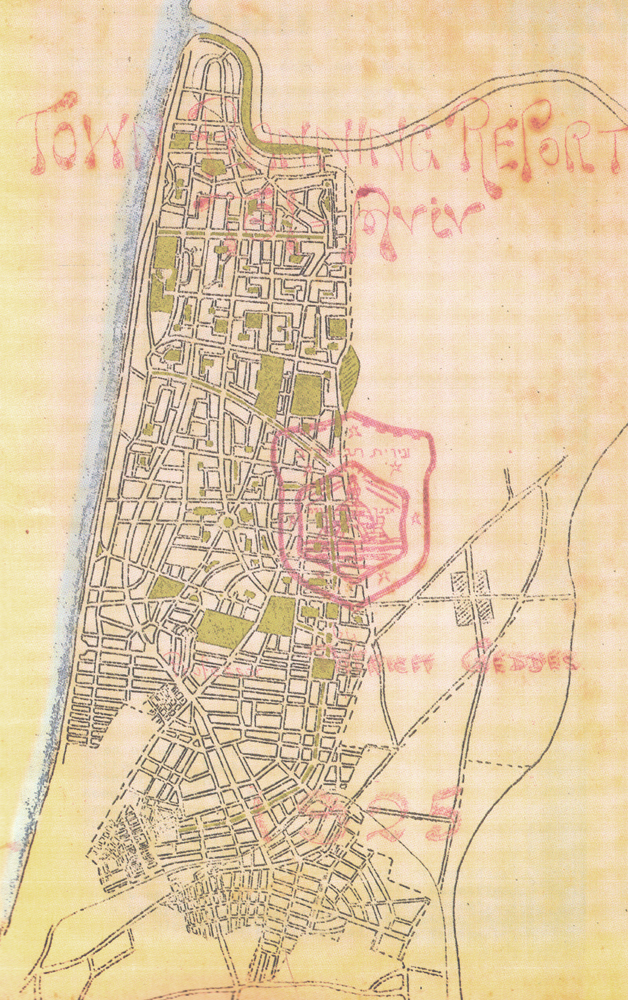
Masterplan for Tel Aviv, 1925, known in Hebrew as the "Geddes Plan"

Geddes worked with his son-in-law, the architect Frank Mears, on a number of projects in historic Palestine. In 1919, he designed a plan for the Hebrew University of Jerusalem at the request of the psychoanalyst, David Eder, who headed the World Zionist Organization's London Branch. He also submitted a report on Jerusalem Actual and Possible to the Military Governor of Jerusalem in November 1919. In 1925 he submitted a report on town planning in Jaffa and Tel Aviv to the Municipality of Tel Aviv, then led by Meir Dizengoff. The municipality adopted his proposals and Tel Aviv is the only city whose early expansion was entirely laid out according to a plan by Geddes. This section of Tel Aviv that was originally planned by Sir Patrick Geddes would later be recognized as "The White City" and designated a World Heritage Site in 2003 by UNESCO. This section was built in the international style of architecture and incorporated modern urban planning principles.

== Recognition and legacy ==
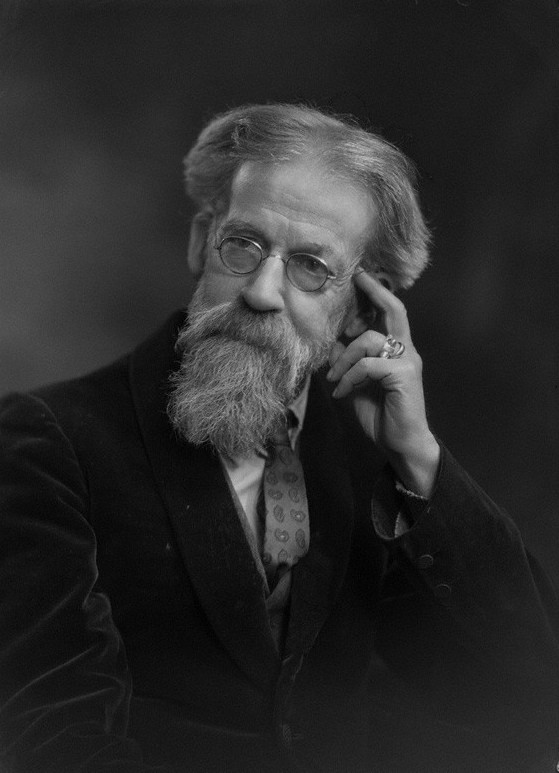
Geddes in 1931

Geddes' ideas had worldwide circulation: his most famous admirer was the American urban theorist Lewis Mumford who claimed that "Geddes was a global thinker in practice, a whole generation or more before the Western democracies fought a global war".

Geddes also influenced several British urban planners (notably Raymond Unwin and Frank Mears), the Indian social scientist Radhakamal Mukerjee and the Catalan architect Cebrià de Montoliu (1873–1923) as well as many other 20th-century thinkers.

Geddes was keenly interested in the science of ecology, an advocate of nature conservation and strongly opposed to environmental pollution. Because of this, some historians have claimed he was a forerunner of modern Green politics.

In August 1982, during the Edinburgh International Festival, Edinburgh College of Art mounted an exhibition entitled On the Side of Life: Patrick Geddes 1854 – 1932, designed by John L. Paterson.

In 2000, a Patrick Geddes Heritage Trail was created on Edinburgh's Royal Mile by the Patrick Geddes Memorial Trust.

Researchers at the Geddes Institute for Urban Research at the University of Dundee continue to develop Geddesian approaches to questions of city and regional planning and questions of social and psychical well-being in the built environment. In late 2015 the University staged an exhibition of Geddes' work in the Lamb Gallery, drawn from the Archives of the Universities of Dundee, Strathclyde, and Edinburgh, to mark the centenary of the publication of Cities in Evolution.

In 2008, the Scottish Historic Building Trust (SHBT) was approached to imagine a future for Riddle's Court in Edinburgh's Lawnmarket, which Geddes had restored for use as a university hall of residence in 1890. Between 2015 and 2017, the Trust undertook a major conservation and regeneration project at the building to create a venue for conferences, meetings and weddings. Riddle's Court now houses the Patrick Geddes Centre for Learning, an educational arm of SHBT.

=== Buildings ===
- The David Wolffsohn University and National Library, Hebrew University, Jerusalem. Design by Patrick Geddes, Frank Mears and Benjamin Chaikin, inaugurated on 15 April 1930.

== Published works ==
- Every Man His Own Art Critic (1887) John Heywood, Manchester.
- The Evolution of Sex (1889) with J.A. Thomson, W. Scott, London.
- The Evergreen: A Northern Seasonal (1895/96), Patrick Geddes and Colleagues, Lawnmarket, Edinburgh.
- City Development, A Report to the Carnegie Dunfermline Trust (1904), Rutgers University Press.
- The Masque of Learning (1912)
- Cities in Evolution (1915) Williams & Norgate, London.
- The life and work of Sir Jagadis C. Bose (1920) Longman, London.
- Biology (1925) with J.A. Thomson, Williams & Norgate, London.
- Life: Outlines of General Biology (1931) with J.A. Thomson, Harper & Brothers, London.

== See also ==
- Scottish Renaissance
- Geddes Plan
- Geddes Island
- Lady Stair's House
- Ramsay Garden
- James Cadenhead, Scottish artist who worked with Geddes on his projects in Edinburgh's Old Town.
- List of urban theorists
- Pro-Jerusalem Society (1918–1926) – Geddes was a member of its leading Council
