= Saint Machar =

Irish saint

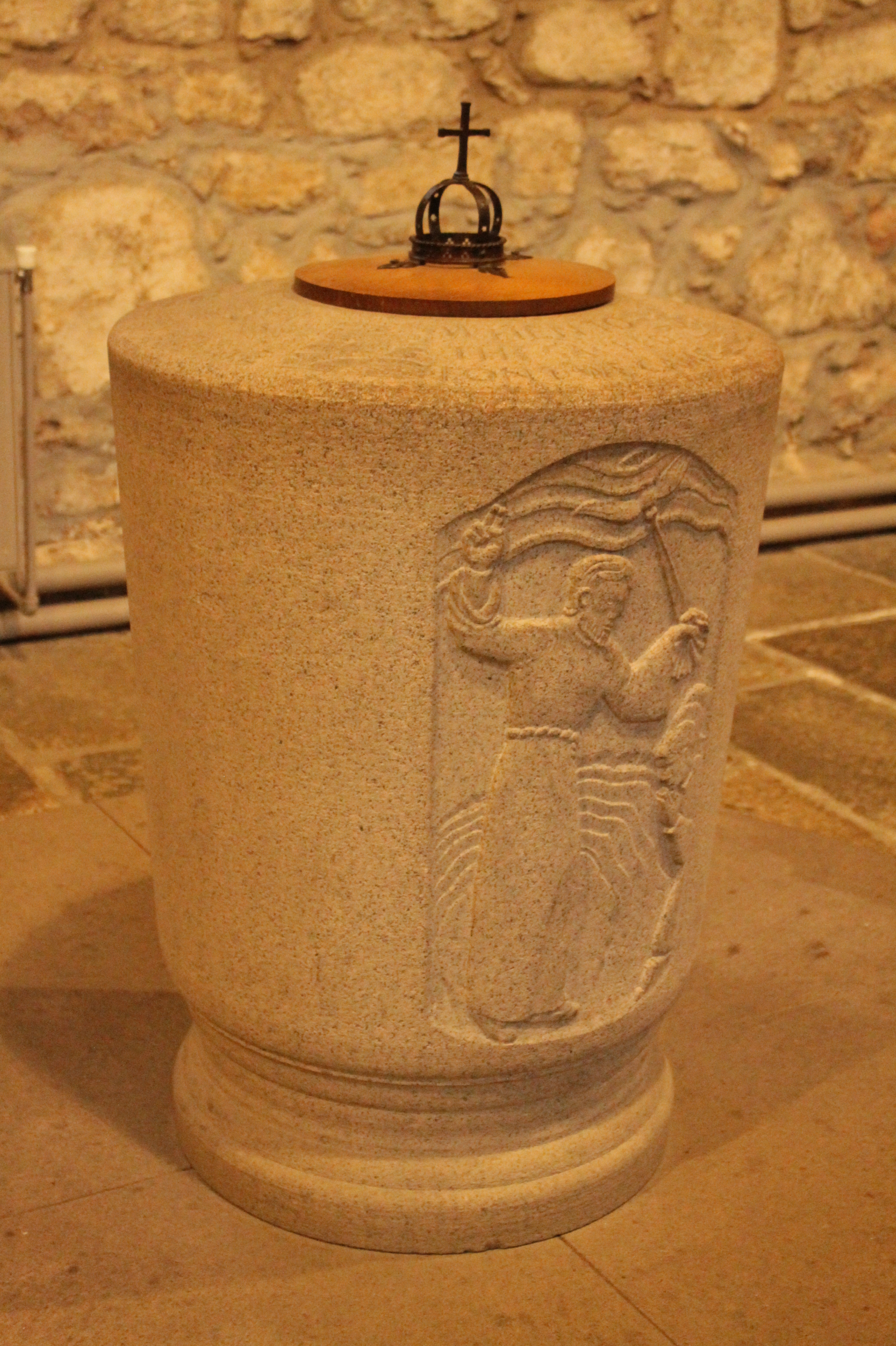
- St Machar baptising converts (on the font in St Machar's Cathedral, Aberdeen, 1954)

Bishop
- Born: Ireland
- Died: 6th century Scotland
- Venerated in: Catholic Church; Eastern Orthodox Church
- Feast: 12 November

Machar was a 6th-century Irish Saint active in Scotland.

A Bishop of Irish origin, Machar is said to have been a former nobleman, baptized by St Colman. He came to Iona with Columba and preached in Mull and later ministered to the Picts around Aberdeen. For this reason he was described anachronistically as the first Bishop of the see of Aberdeen.

His legend, however, in the Aberdeen breviary makes him "Archbishop of Tours", appointed by Gregory the Great for the last few years of his life. This story deserves no credence. Water from his well was used for baptism in Aberdeen Cathedral. A few dedications survive from this area.

Much of what is claimed to be known about St Machar derives from the Aberdeen Breviary, a work compiled in the late fifteenth to early sixteenth centuries, long after the traditional date of Machar's life. It is therefore hard to assess its reliability.

One recent theory is that St Machar and St Mungo were the same person, on the grounds of a possible link between their names (Colm Ó Baoill, St Machar - some linguistic light?, Innes Review XLIV, pp. 1–13).

== Commemoration ==
St Machar's Cathedral in Aberdeen is named in his honour. The cathedral's font by Hew Lorimer depicts the saint baptising converts.

The Machar oil field in the North Sea is named after the saint.

There is also a St Machar Academy in Aberdeen, situated on St Machar Drive.

Machar is the patron saint of Aberdeen in the Scottish Episcopal Diocese of Aberdeen and Orkney. His feast day is 12 November.

St Machar's, Ranfurly church in Bridge of Weir is named in his honour after a minister from St Machar's cathedral became the minister.
