= David Cunningham (bishop) =

Scottish prelate and diplomat

- Bishop of Aberdeen
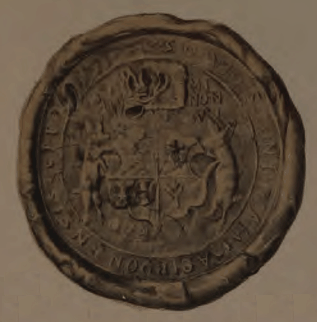
- Church: Church of Scotland
- See: Diocese of Aberdeen
- In office: 1577–1600
- Predecessor: William Gordon
- Successor: Peter Blackburn
- Previous post: Provost of Bothwell Collegiate Church

Orders
- Consecration: 1356

Personal details
- Born: c. 1540 Cunninghame, North Ayrshire
- Died: 1600 Aberdeen

David Cunningham or Cunynghame (c. 1540–1600) was a 16th-century Scottish prelate and diplomat. He was the first Protestant Bishop of Aberdeen. His predecessor, William Gordon began as a Roman Catholic bishop, but accepted the Church of Scotland's authority.

== Life ==
Born around 1540, he graduated in the early 1560s as Master of Arts from St Leonard's College, St Andrews. Cunningham also studied Civil Law in France, at the University of Paris and the University of Bourges.

He became a Protestant sometime before 1562, when he was made minister of Lanark; he held this position until 1570, when he took over Lesmahagow, moving to Cadder in 1572 and then to Lenzie in 1574. Additionally, on 22 March 1572, Cunningham became Provost of Bothwell Collegiate Church.

After the appointment of Patrick Adamson as Archbishop of St Andrews in December 1576, Cunningham replaced Adamson as the chaplain of James Douglas, 4th Earl of Morton, Regent of Scotland. With access to such high level magnate patronage, on either 5 October or 5 November 1577, Cunningham was elected as Bishop of Aberdeen, receiving consecration at the Kirk of St Nicholas on 11 November. In this year, too, he became Chancellor of King's College, Aberdeen.

Cunningham would eventually enjoy a good relationship with the king, but his association with Regent Morton initially made him suspect. The death of his patron, Morton, in 1581, put his position under pressure, and he was forced to flee into the west for a little time. He was also under pressure from the a large section of the Scottish church, which was becoming more hostile to episcopacy; in 1586, the General Assembly accused him of adultery, a charge which the king cleared him of in 1587.

He became a trusted servant of the king, James VI of Scotland, and it was Cunningham who was chosen to baptise the king's son, Prince Henry, on 30 August 1594. The ceremony was held at Stirling Castle. Cunningham gave a speech outlining the genealogy of the prince, his English descent, and the recent history of the diplomatic relations of Scotland. His role at the baptism was controversial and the Presbytery of Edinburgh had asked kirk ministers to prevent or boycott his participation. Cunningham's speech was problematic for its reference to the English succession, reminding the audience of a controversial poem by Andrew Melville, Principis Scoti-Brittanorum Natalia.

Cunningham helped negotiate reconciliation between the king and the devoutly Catholic George Gordon, 6th Earl of Huntly. In 1598, he was sent as a diplomat with Peter Young to Denmark and Germany to promote King James' claims to the English throne.

David Cunningham died on 30 August 1600, at Aberdeen. He is buried in St Machar's Cathedral. He left assets of £3052 (Scots). He founded a grammar school in Banff.

== Family ==
In 1569 he married Katherine Wallace, but had no children. His widow married Robert Udny of Udny, near Tillicoultry.

== See also ==
- Scottish Reformation

Religious titles
Preceded by William Gordon	Bishop of Aberdeen; 1577–1600	Succeeded by Peter Blackburn
