= Patrick Forbes =

Patrick Forbes may refer to:

- Patrick Forbes (bishop of Aberdeen) (1564–1635), Scottish churchman
- Patrick William Forbes (1861–1918), army commander
- Patrick Forbes (bishop of Caithness) (1611–1680), Scottish bishop of Caithness
- P. J. Forbes (born 1967), American baseball player
- Patrick Forbes (minister) (1776–1847), Scottish minister
- Patrick Forbes (baseball) (born 2004), American professional baseball pitcher
