= Tidyman =

Tidyman may refer to:

- Tidyman's, defunct American grocery store chain
- Bob Tidyman (1891–1916), Australian rugby league
- Ernest Tidyman (1928–1984), American author and screenwriter
- Philip Tidyman (1776–1850), American physician, traveller and philanthropist
- the nickname for a pictogram introduced by UK-based charity Keep Britain Tidy
