= William Scrogie =

Bishop

William Scrogie (1609–1675) was a Scottish clergyman in the Church of Scotland who served as Bishop of Argyll.

== Life ==
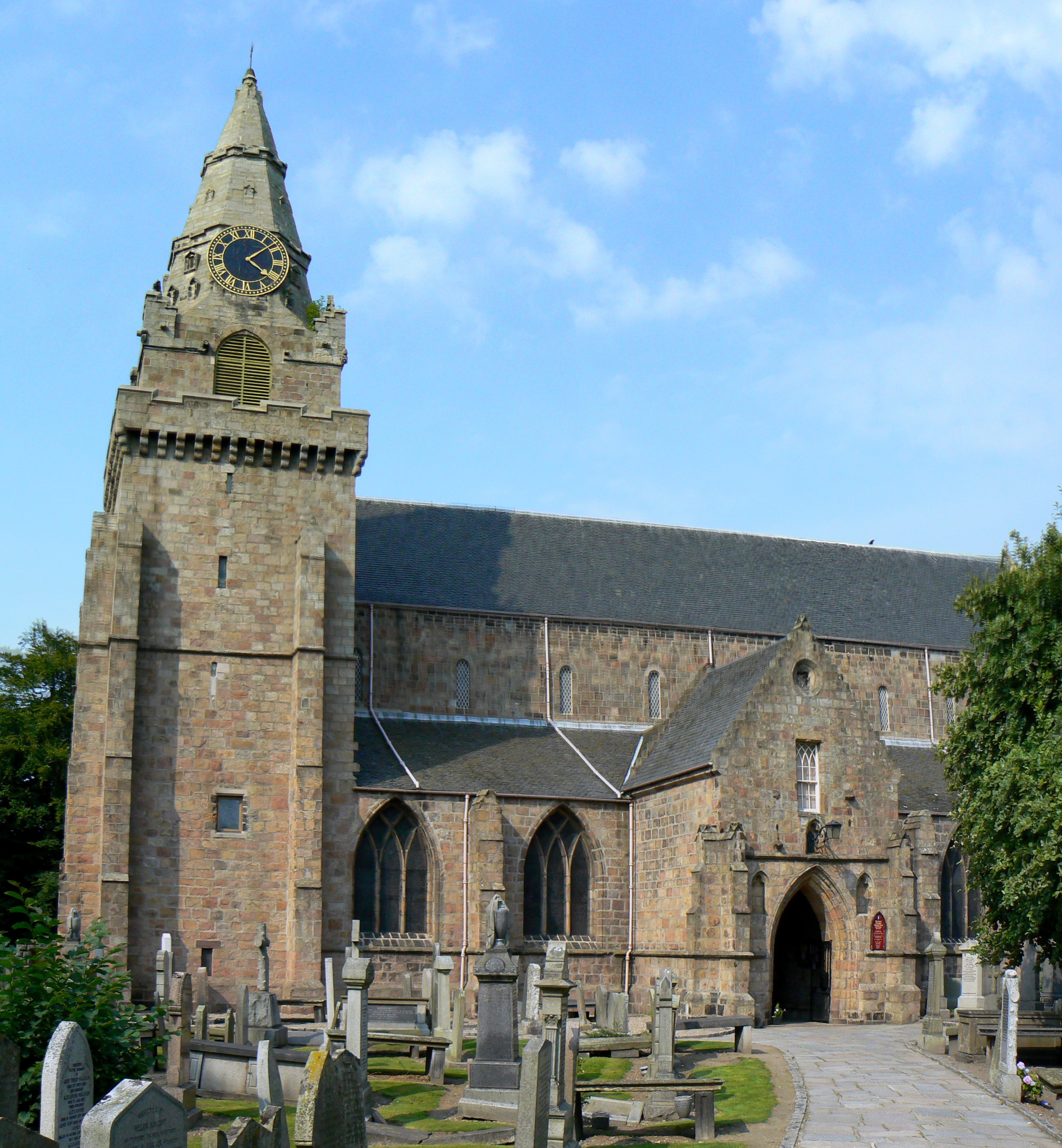
St Machar's Cathedral

He was born in Old Aberdeen the son of Rev Alexander Scrogie minister of St Machar's Cathedral and Rector of King's College, Aberdeen. His mother was Jean Ross. He was educated by his father at King's College, graduating MA in 1638.

He was ordained as minister of Rathven in April 1649 in place of Rev Patrick Glas under patronage of George Hay of Rannas House (sometimes spelled Rannes). His father came to live with him in 1655 and died in Rathven manse in 1659.

In 1666 he was appointed Bishop of Argyll in place of Rev John Young who died before he was consecrated in replacement of Bishop David Fletcher. On his death in 1675 he was succeeded by Arthur Rose.

== Family ==
In November 1665, somewhat late in life, aged 56 he married the 20 year old Katherine Scougal in St Machar's Cathedral in Aberdeen. Katherine was daughter of the Bishop of Aberdeen, Patrick Scougal. They had two daughters one of whom married Rev James Chalmers of Paisley Abbey. On his death Katherine married Bishop Patrick Forbes.

== Publications ==
- Mirabilis Dei
