= David Rait =

Scottish clergyman for the Church of Scotland

David Rait (c. 1560–1632) was a Scottish clergyman in the Church of Scotland, serving as minister of St Machar's Cathedral in Aberdeen and as Moderator of the General Assembly in Aberdeen in 1605.

== Life ==
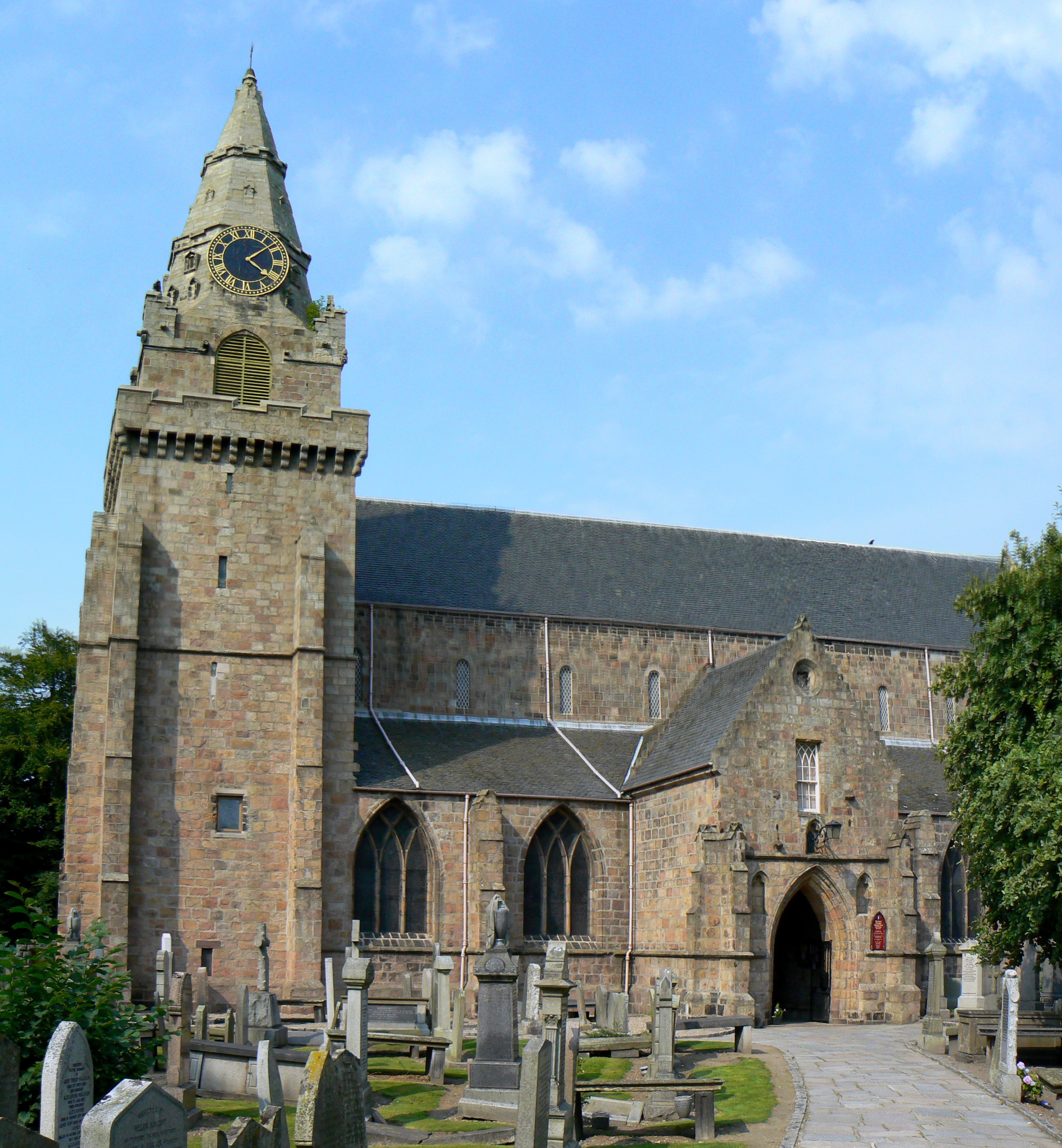
St Machar's Cathedral

He belonged to the Rait family of Hallgreen in The Mearns. In 1598, he succeeded Alexander Arbuthnot as minister of St Machar's Cathedral in Old Aberdeen and concurrently served as Principal of the nearby King's College, Aberdeen. He chaired the General Assembly in Aberdeen in 1605 in his capacity as Moderator of the Synod. Rait received a Doctor of Divinity degree in 1620. He retired from St Machar's Cathedral in 1621, with Alexander Scrogie succeeding him, but continued as Principal of King's College until his death in 1632.

== Family ==
In December 1592, he married Elizabeth Allardice, the daughter of John Allardice of Allardice Castle. The couple had one son, James Rait.
