= Robert Brough =

Scottish painter (1872–1905)

Robert Brough ARSA
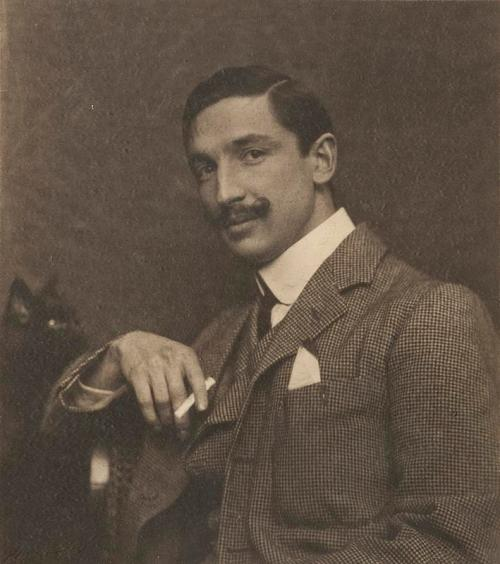
- Photograph of Robert Brough from Aberdeen Archives, Gallery and Museums collection
- Born: 20 March 1872
- Died: 21 January 1905 (aged 32)
- Resting place: St Machar's Cathedral
- Education: Gray's School of Art

Robert John Cameron Brough ARSA (20 March 1872 – 21 January 1905) was a Scottish painter born near Invergordon, Ross and Cromarty.

== Life ==
He was born on 20 March 1872. at Garty Cottage, Kilmuir Easter, near Invergordon. His mother was Helen Brough, formerly lady's maid to the duchess of Hamilton; his father John Cameron, coachman to the Hamiltons.

Brough was raised by maternal relatives on a farm on the outskirts of Aberdeen. He was a pupil at Ruthrieston School in Aberdeen until 1884, leaving to become an apprentice engraver with Andrew Gibb & Co., Aberdeen until 1890/1891. Despite working long hours, Brough attended evening classes at Gray's School of Art, Aberdeen, from 1885.

He then entered the Royal Scottish Academy, and in the first year took the Stuart prize for figure painting, the Chalmers painting bursary, and the Maclame-Walters medal for composition.

After two years in Paris under J. P. Laurens and Benjamin-Constant at Julian's atelier, he settled in Aberdeen in 1894 as a portrait painter and political cartoonist. During this time he contributed the illustration Roses to The Evergreen: A Northern Seasonal: The Book of Summer published by Patrick Geddes and Colleagues in Edinburgh in 1896.

A portrait of Mr. W.D. Ross first drew attention to his talent in 1896, and in the following year he scored a marked success at the Royal Academy with his Fantaisie en Folie, which he bequeathed to the National Gallery of British Art (now the Tate gallery). Two of his paintings, Twixt Sun and Moon and Childhood of St. Anne of Brittany, were at the Venice municipal gallery. Brough's art was influenced by Henry Raeburn and by modern French training, but it strikes a very personal note.

Brough established a studio in the early years of the 20th century in Tite Street, Chelsea near to that of his friend and mentor John Singer Sargent.

On 19 January 1905 Brough was travelling back to London following a session painting in Peeblesshire. He caught the overnight express from St Enoch Station Glasgow. Tragically the train was involved in a three vehicle railway accident at Cudworth station in Yorkshire. The train on which he was travelling caught fire. Seven people were killed and twenty injured, some critically including Brough who was badly burned. Singer Sargent heard of the accident and headed north to Sheffield to be at Brough's bedside shortly before he died on 21 January 1905.

He was returned to Scotland and buried in the churchyard of St Machar's Cathedral. The grave is in the narrow section on the north side of the church.

Images associated with Robert Brough

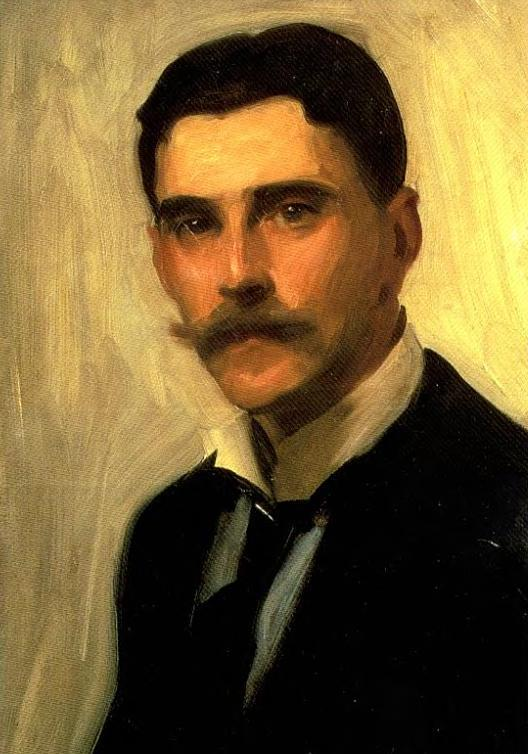
Portrait of Robert Brough by his friend, John Singer Sargent

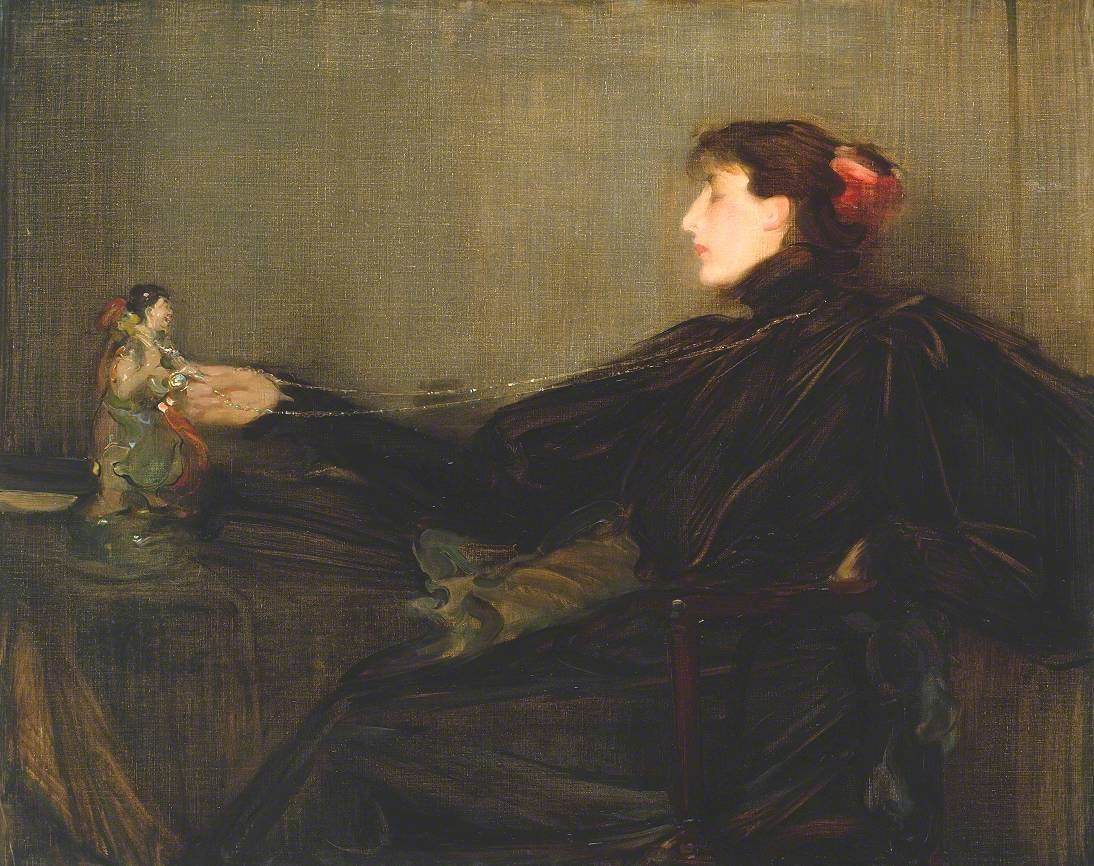
Fantaisie en Folie 1897, Tate Gallery

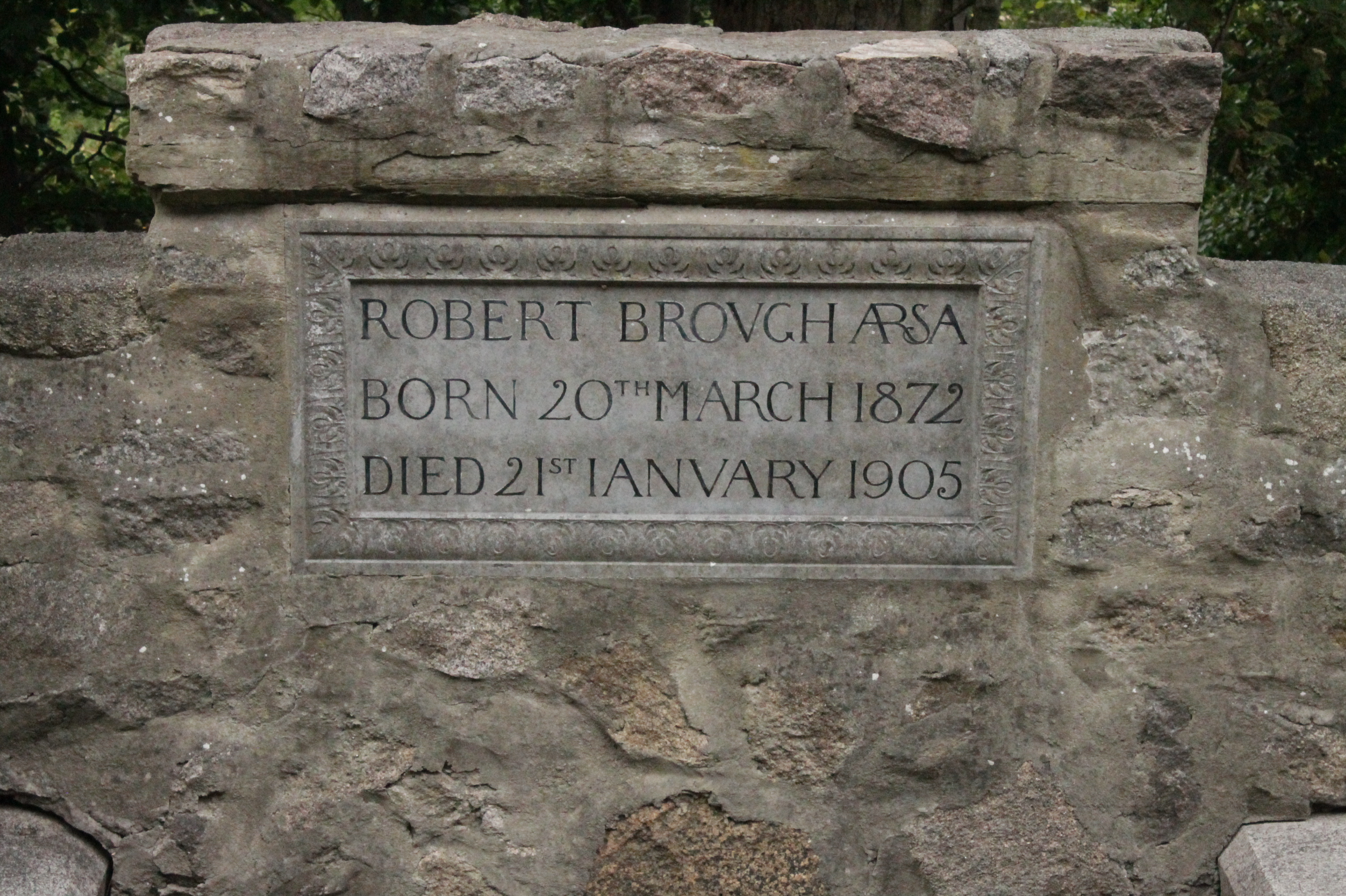
Brough's Grave in the ground of St Machar's Cathedral

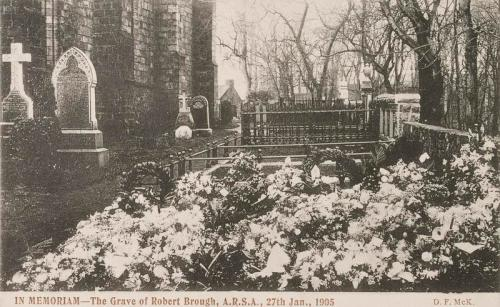
Brough's grave covered in flowers

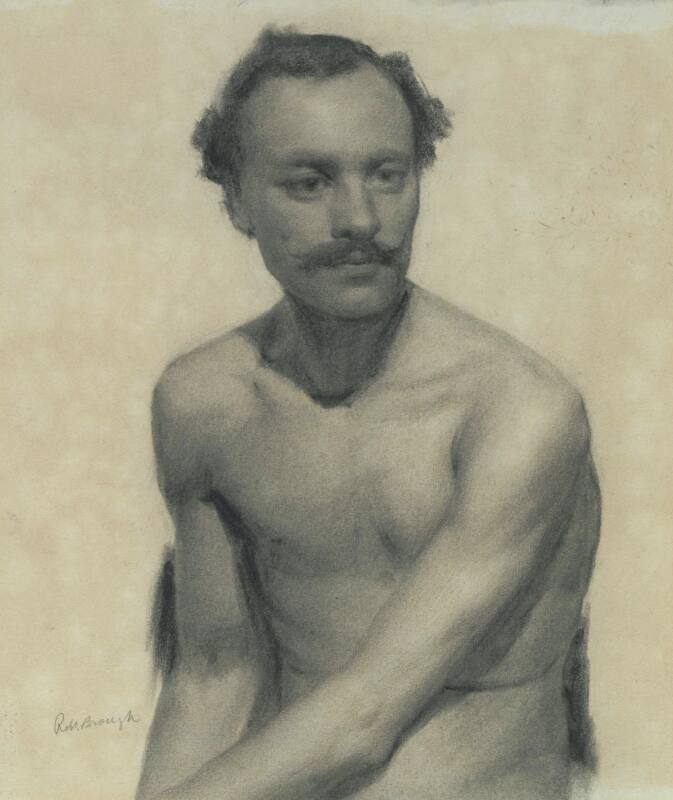
A Life Study, Aberdeen Archives, Gallery and Museums

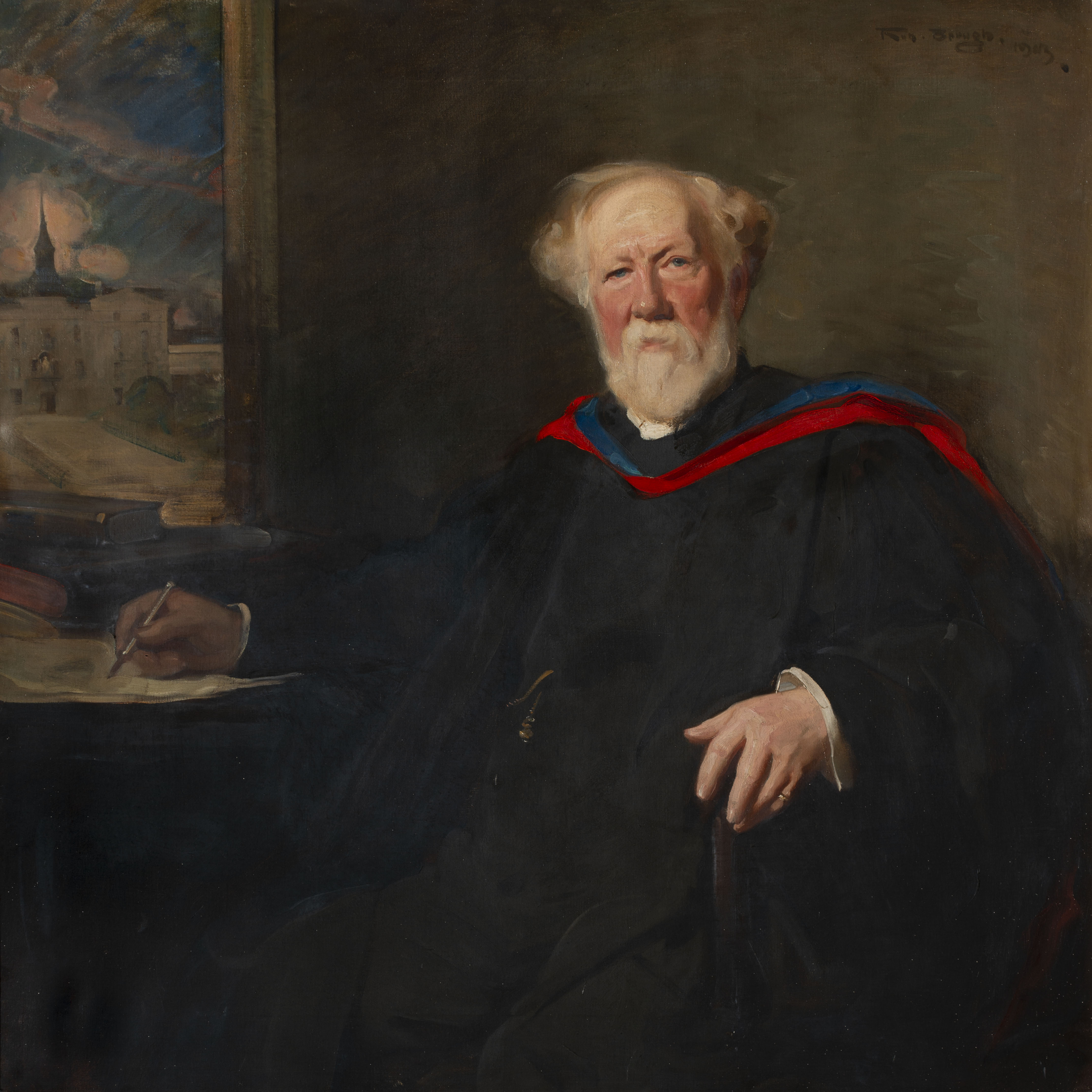
Rev. Alexander Ogilvie, MA LLD (1903), Aberdeen Archives, Gallery and Museums
