= Alexander Scrogie =

Church of Scotland clergyman

Alexander Scrogie (1565–1659) was a Scottish clergyman in the Church of Scotland who was minister of St Machar's Cathedral in Aberdeen and was an anti-Covenanting figure in Scotland during the English Civil War. He served as Rector of Aberdeen University.

== Life ==
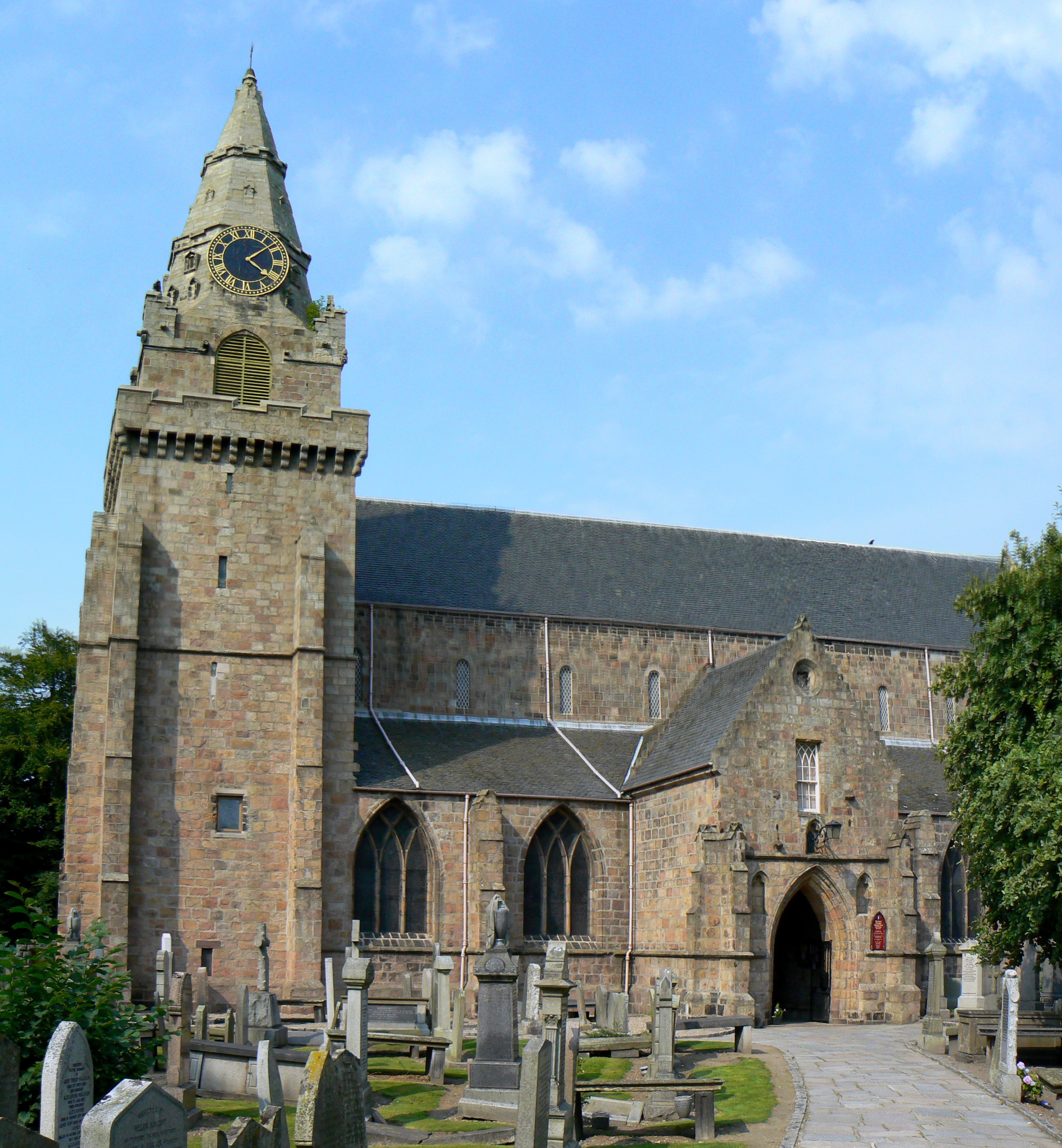
St Machar's Cathedral

He was born in northern Scotland in 1565. He was educated at King's College, Aberdeen graduating MA around 1580. He then became a "regent", lecturing at Marischal College, Aberdeen.

He became an assistant minister at Skene, Aberdeenshire in 1603 and was formally ordained there in 1605. In that year he attended the unlawful General Assembly in Aberdeen, chaired by Rev David Rait.

In January 1606 he translated to Drumoak parish south-west of Aberdeen. In March 1608, the General Assembly ordered him to reside in the parish (as he was not) and in March 1609, they charged him with non-residence. He answered that his family lived there every day but he only lived there at weekends due to his commitments at Marischal College (which continued). He was ordered to quit his college role at Lammastide. In 1621, he translated to St Machar's Cathedral in place of David Rait.

In 1627, King's College awarded him a Doctor of Divinity. He joined with others of equal status to oppose the National Covenant in the early 1630s. He was elected Rector of King's College in 1636. In 1638, he was officially rebuked for celebrating communion on Christmas Day (as the General Assembly had banned this). On 15 July 1639, his house was seized by soldiers of William Keith, Earl Marischal's Regiment, in his capture of Aberdeen.

In August 1640, he was deposed as minister due to his continuing opposition to the Covenant, but in July 1641, made apology and made full recantation to his presbytery in May 1642, and was reinstated in full. He stepped down from St Machar's in 1640 but did not fully retire until 1655 and died in Rathven manse (the home of his son William) on the north coast in 1659.

== Family ==
He married Jean Ross daughter of Rev. James Ross, second charge at Aberdeen. They had several children:

- William Scrogie, Bishop of Argyll from 1666 to 1675
- Alexander Scrogie (1615–1661), minister of St Machar's
- James Scrogie
- Patrick (F), married William Douglas of Forgue
- Marjorie, married Alexander Innes of Mortlach
