= St Machar Academy =

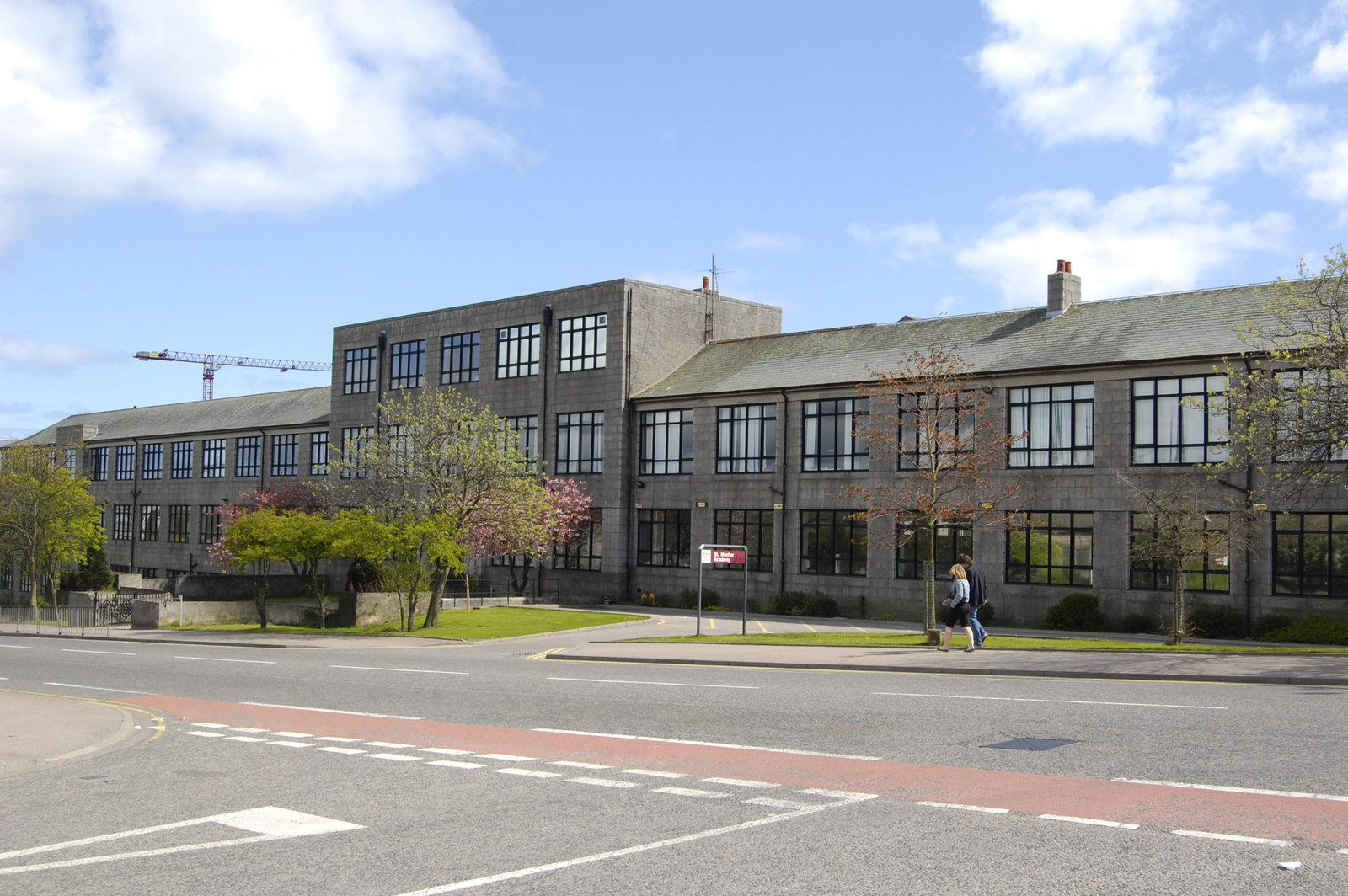
- The exterior of the school building from St Machar Drive.

Location
- St Machar Drive; Aberdeen, AB24 3YZ; Scotland; 57.1660°N 2.1113°W

Information
- Type: Secondary school
- Established: 24 August 1988
- Local authority: Aberdeen City Council
- Head teacher: Lois Benvie (Acting)
- Gender: Co-educational
- Age: 11 to 18
- Enrolment: 817 (approx)
- Houses: Crombie, Don, Dunbar, Meston, Skene
- School years: S1-S6
- Website: St Machar Academy

St Machar Academy is an Aberdeen City Council secondary school on St Machar Drive. It is near King's College and St Machar's Cathedral.

St Machar Academy was opened on 24 August 1988 from the merger of Hilton Academy and Powis Academy. Other names considered for the school included Aberdeen Academy, Old Aberdeen Academy and Bon Accord Academy. On 28 June 2002, Linksfield Academy was closed and it merged with St Machar Academy on 22 August after the summer holidays.

== School Background and History ==
- Founded 24 August 1988 through the merging of Hilton Academy and Powis Academy
- A further merger occurred in 2002, when Linksfield Academy closed and its pupils joined St Machar Academy.
- The building originally opened in 1939 and features a weak art deco granite design.
- Historically included a notable Compton Illuminated Organ installed in 1968, later destroyed in a 1982 fire.
