= William Stewart (bishop of Aberdeen) =

Scottish clergyman and diplomat

- Bishop of Aberdeen
- Church: Roman Catholic Church
- See: Diocese of Aberdeen
- In office: 1532–1545
- Predecessor: Gavin Dunbar
- Successor: William Gordon
- Previous posts: Dean of Glasgow; Provost of Lincluden

Orders
- Consecration: 1533, at St Machar's Cathedral

Personal details
- Born: c. 1490 Glasgow, Scotland
- Died: 10 April 1545 Aberdeen

William Stewart (c. 1490–1545) was a late medieval Scottish prelate. Born around 1490 in Glasgow, he was the son of Thomas Stewart of Minto. Details about his early life are obscure, but it is known that he attended the University of Glasgow before travelling to continental Europe to study theology and canon law. The first benefice he held was the parsonage of Lochmaben, which he was in possession of by July 1528. In the same year he became rector of Ayr, while he had received crown presentation as Provost of Lincluden Collegiate Church in July 1529, a post he would hold along with his new position as Lord High Treasurer of Scotland.

In 1530 he received a crown presentation to Pope Clement VII for the deanery of Glasgow, a position he held until on 22 March 1532, when he was nominated by King James V of Scotland to succeed Gavin Dunbar as Bishop of Aberdeen. Stewart was consecrated as Bishop of Aberdeen in either March or April 1533. Stewart was an active and important servant of the Scottish king. He led the diplomatic expedition to England which, on 11 May 1534, agreed a peace treaty between James V and King Henry VIII of England. He was sent to France in 1536, where he helped draw up the contract for his king's marriage to Mary of Guise. He went on a further mission to England in December 1541.

As Bishop of Aberdeen, he strongly resisted the emerging protestant heresies, attending condemnations in 1534 and 1540. Bishop Stewart laid down a new series of constitutions for his clergy, constitutions resembling and reinforcing similar such measures previously enacted by Bishop Elphinstone. He completed building work on King's College, Aberdeen, including a new library and sacristy, as well as two new schools for his diocese. Bishop Stewart died at Aberdeen on 10 April 1545, and was buried in the south transept of Aberdeen Cathedral.

== Notes ==
Religious titles
Preceded by Robert Stewart	Provost of Lincluden; 1529–1536	Succeeded by John Stewart
Preceded by Robert Forman	Dean of Glasgow; 1530–1533	Succeeded by James Lamb
Preceded by Gavin Dunbar	Bishop of Aberdeen; 1532–1545	Succeeded by William Gordon
