= William Gordon (bishop of Aberdeen) =

Scottish noble and prelate

- Bishop of Aberdeen
- Church: Roman Catholic Church/ Church of Scotland
- See: Diocese of Aberdeen
- In office: 1545–1577
- Predecessor: William Stewart
- Successor: David Cunningham
- Previous posts: Archdeacon of Caithness; Archdeacon of Dunblane; Chancellor of Moray

Orders
- Consecration: 23 December 1546 x 26 January 1547

Personal details
- Born: About 1499 Aberdeenshire
- Died: 06 August 1577 (aged about 78) Bishop's Palace, Old Aberdeen, Aberdeenshire, Scotland

William Gordon (c. 1499 – 6 August 1577) was a 16th-century Scottish noble and prelate, the last of the pre-Reformation bishops of Aberdeen owing allegiance to the Roman Catholic Church.

Born in Aberdeenshire, he was the son of Janet Stewart, the daughter of John Stewart, 1st Earl of Atholl, and her husband Alexander Gordon, 3rd Earl of Huntly. As a youth, Gordon studied at the University of Aberdeen, the University of Paris and the University of Angers, graduating in Civil law and Canon Law.

His high aristocratic birth and educational record brought him to the attention of King James V of Scotland, who in 1537 wrote to Pope Paul III, requesting that the latter reserve benefices for Gordon. He had in fact been Archdeacon of Caithness, briefly in 1529. William Gordon was Chancellor of the diocese of Moray between 1540 and 1546, and for a short time Archdeacon of Dunblane in 1545. In either March or April 1545, Mary of Guise, the mother of Mary, Queen of Scots, wrote to the Pope requesting that Gordon be made coadjutor (designated successor) to Bishop William Stewart of Aberdeen, as the latter was suffering from bad health. Stewart in fact died on 10 April, and with the support of Governor Châtellerault, Gordon was provided to the see on 17 May, receiving consecration in either late December 1545 or early January of the following year.

In the first few years of his episcopate, Gordon made a determined, unsuccessful effort to stamp out the growth of Presbyterianism. In 1549 the Scottish provincial council convened to reform the Scottish church. Bishop Gordon was, arguably, part of the problem, as he had fathered eight children by an unmarried woman named Janet Knowles whom he supported with episcopal revenues, and was inclined as many other priests and prelates toward reforms to allow marriage by the clergy. In 1560 the Scottish Church broke its ties to Rome, banned Mass and established an independent Scottish Church. Gordon was not an enthusiastic supporter of the latter and after the return of Mary, Queen of Scots - a Roman Catholic - to Scotland and her takeover of the kingdom, he assumed a low profile and the Queen issued a decree of protection to the University of Aberdeen, of which Gordon was chancellor; Gordon's nephew, moreover, was the staunchly Catholic George Gordon, 4th Earl of Huntly.

After the downfall of Mary, Queen of Scots, in 1567, Bishop Gordon appears to have accepted the authority of the Church of Scotland since he retained his see until his death on 6 August 1577. He died at Old Aberdeen, in the Bishop's Palace, and was buried in St Machar's Cathedral.

== Notes ==
Religious titles
Preceded by William Stewart	Bishop of Aberdeen; 1545–1577	Succeeded by David Cunningham
