= Patrick Forbes (bishop of Caithness) =

Patrick Forbes (c.1610–1679) was a Scottish Protestant Bishop of Caithness.

== Life ==
Forbes was the third son of John Forbes, minister of Alford, Aberdeenshire, and afterwards of Delft. Patrick studied at King's College, Aberdeen of which his namesake uncle, Bishop Patrick Forbes, was both Bishop of Aberdeen and Chancellor of the College, and graduated in 1631. Returning to Holland he became an army chaplain. He was in Scotland in 1638, and signed the national covenant in presence of the General Assembly held at Glasgow in that year.

In 1641 he became minister of the British church at Delft, in which his father had previously officiated. He was an acquaintance and correspondent of Principal Baillie, who makes favourable mention of him in his letters of 1644, 1645, and 1646. He commends a manuscript which Forbes had written and sent him, and wishes to see it in print. He asks Spang, minister of the Scots church at Campvere, to 'keep correspondence with that young man,’ and to urge him to 'use diligence' against the British sectaries in Holland, and to 'write against the anabaptists.' After a short ministry at Delft he again became a military chaplain (apparently to the Scots brigade), and continued to officiate in that capacity till the Restoration.

The king Charles II, having restored episcopacy in Scotland, appointed Forbes, then chaplain to Andrew Rutherford, 1st Earl of Teviot, governor of Dunkirk, to the bishopric of Caithness, and with five others he was consecrated at the abbey church of Holyrood 7 May 1662 by the archbishops of St. Andrews and Glasgow and the bishop of Galloway. He had probably received presbyterian ordination in Holland, but none of the presbyterian clergy who were raised to the episcopate in Scotland were reordained. James Kirkton, referring to his appointment to the bishopric, calls him 'the degenerate son of ane excellent father.'

Forbes died in 1679, and was buried in Kirkwall Cathedral.

== Family ==
He married twice: firstly in Holland to a daughter of Colonel Erskine, an officer of the Scots brigade, and had a family. His son John, who was commissary of Caithness, died at Craigievar, Aberdeenshire, in October 1668, and was buried at Leochel in the Craigievar aisle.

He secondly married Katherine Scougal, daughter of Bishop Patrick Scougal and widow of William Scrogie.
