= Philip Tidyman =

American explorer

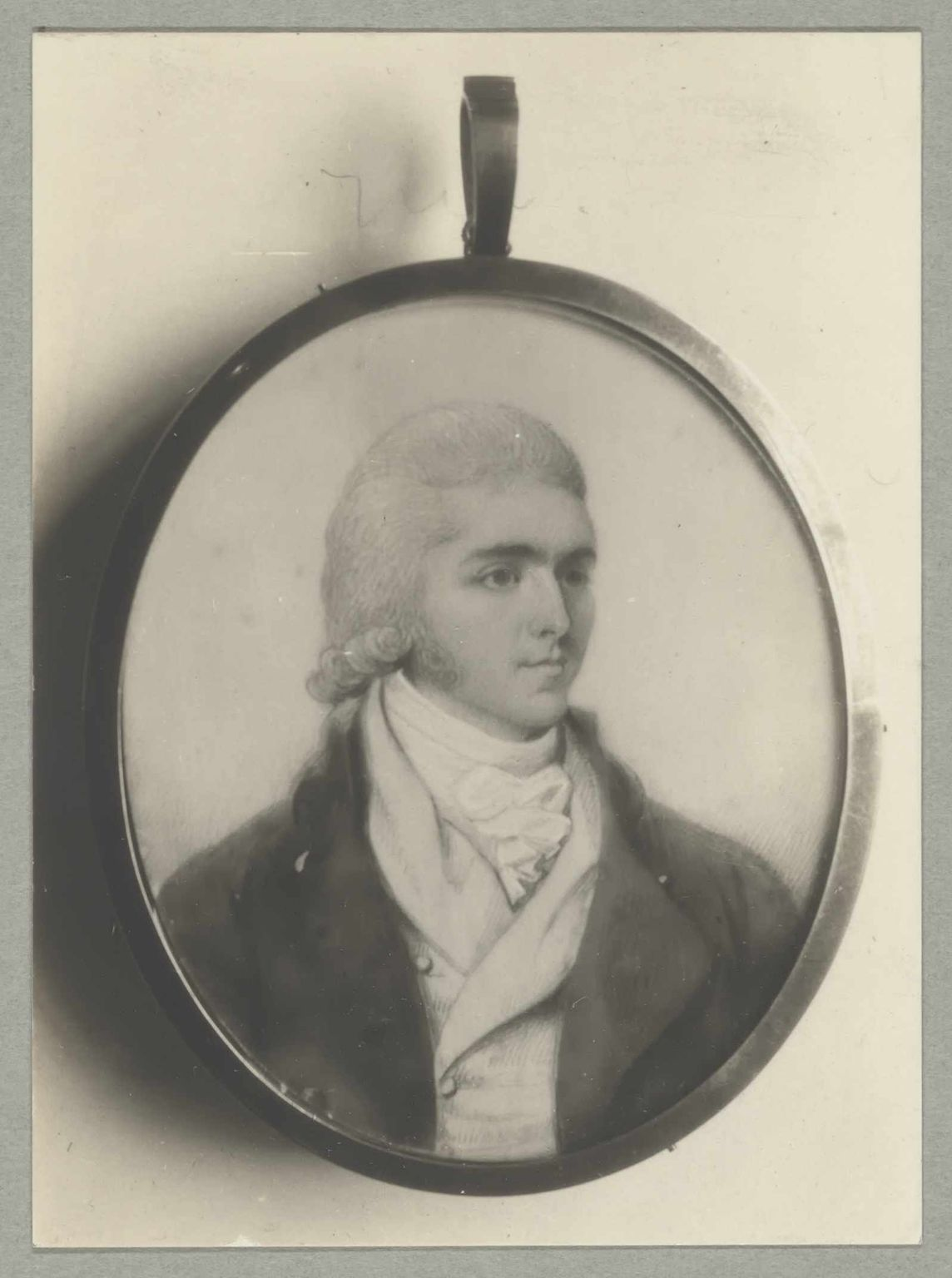
- Born: 1776; Charleston
- Died: 11 June 1850; Aberdeen
- Education: University of Edinburgh, University of Göttingen
- Occupations: Medical doctor, planter, politician, surgeon
- Mother: Hester Rose Tidyman

Philip Tidyman (1776–1850) was an American medical doctor, traveller and philanthropist.

== Life ==
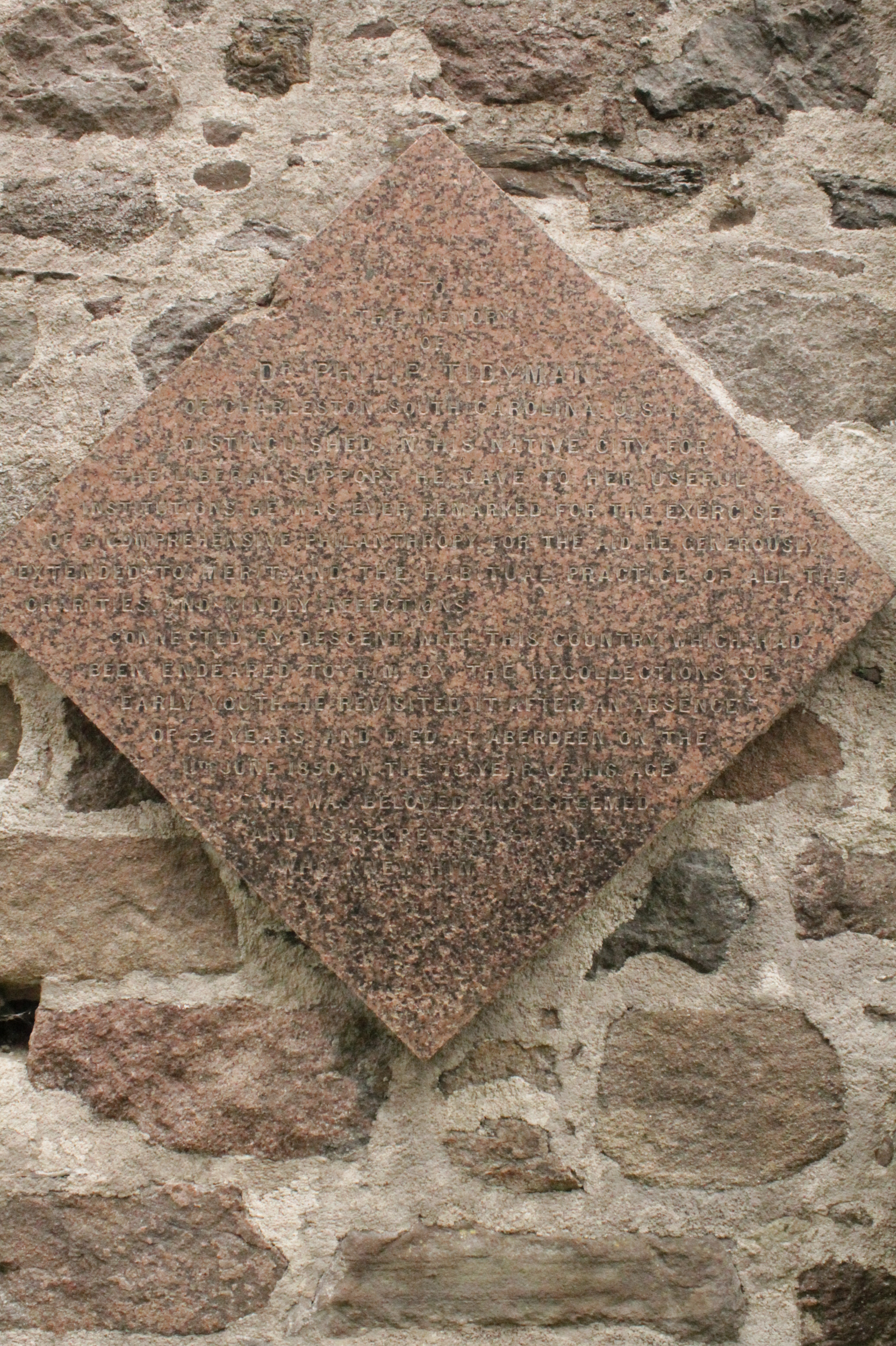
The grave of Philip Tidyman, St Machar's Chathedral

He was born in Charleston, South Carolina in America the son of Philip Tidyman and his wife, Hester Rose. His father owned a plantation two miles from Wambaw Bridge. He had previously been a silversmith in Charleston but inherited a large plantation through the Rose family. The Rose family were one of 35 Scottish families in Charleston in 1776. In 1782 the father was charged with being a loyalist (to the British cause).

The loyalist charge holds water as around 1790 young Philip went to Europe to study Medicine and attended both Edinburgh University in Scotland and Gottingen University in Germany. He was allegedly the first American to gain a doctorate at a German University.

In Edinburgh he was possibly living with his Scots relatives: James Rose, a solicitor living at Scots Close on the Royal Mile.

He returned to Charleston in 1801 as a physician and planter. He was a member of the House and served on the 15th, 16th and 18th Assemblies.

He owned the Marshfield and Cedar Hill Plantations at Georgetown, South Carolina. He also had a large house on the Winyaw Barony estate. In 1826 he observed that "the blacks (slaves) suffered little from yellow fever (malaria)" which was probably due to an ancestral exposure to this disease. His plantation and slave ownership appears to have been in the form of an "absentee owner" and rather than live on the plantation, he worked as a physician in town, attaching himself to the urban life.

In 1825, Tidyman was elected as a member of the American Philosophical Society.

He died in Aberdeen on 11 June 1850. He is buried in the churchyard of St Machar's Cathedral. The grave lies on the east side of the church, within the former transept.

Although frequently referenced as a "philanthropist" there is little evidence of this other than some campaigning against harsh prison treatment.

At the time of his death he owned 138 slaves on his Georgetown estate. The 1850 US Federal Census records Tidyman as having enslaved 130 people at the Georgetown labour camp and an additional 11 people at his urban compound in Charleston

== Publications ==
- Letters on the Pennsylvania System of Solitary Imprisonment (1835)
