= St Machar's Cathedral =

Church in Aberdeen, Scotland

Coordinates: 57.1698°N 2.1021°W

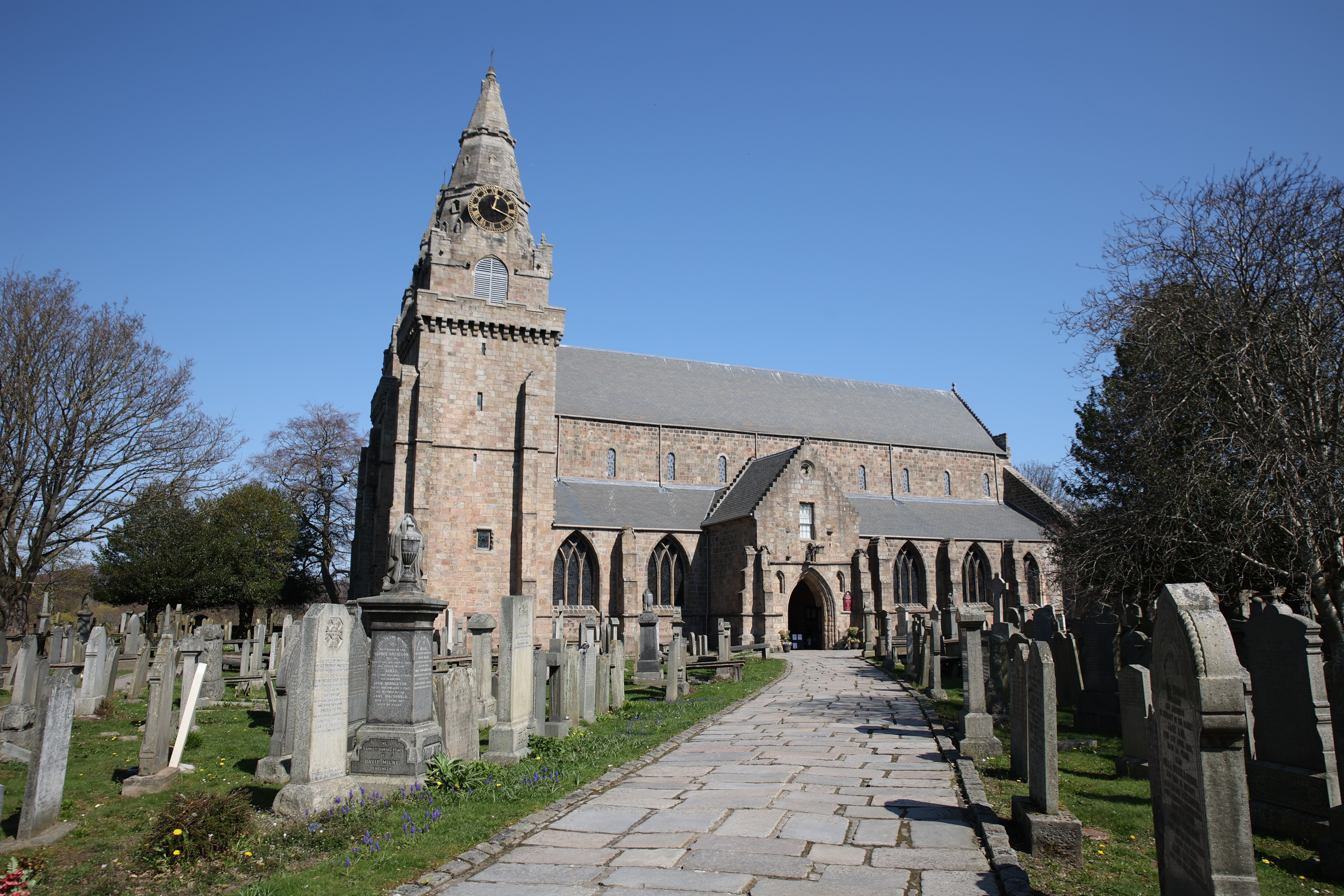
- St Machar's main entrance (south)
- St Machar's Cathedral
- Location: The Chanonry, Old Aberdeen, Aberdeen AB24 1RQ
- Country: Scotland
- Denomination: Church of Scotland
- Previous denomination: Roman Catholic
- Churchmanship: Presbyterian

History
- Dedication: St Machar

Listed Building – Category A
- Official name: St. Machar Cathedral, excluding SM90001
- Designated: 12 January 1967
- Reference no.: LB19957

Listed Building – Category B
- Official name: St. Machar's Cathedral, Gate Lodges
- Designated: 12 January 1967
- Reference no.: LB19959

Scheduled monument
- Official name: St Machar's Cathedral and graveyard
- Type: Ecclesiastical: cathedral
- Designated: 31 December 1921
- Reference no.: SM90001

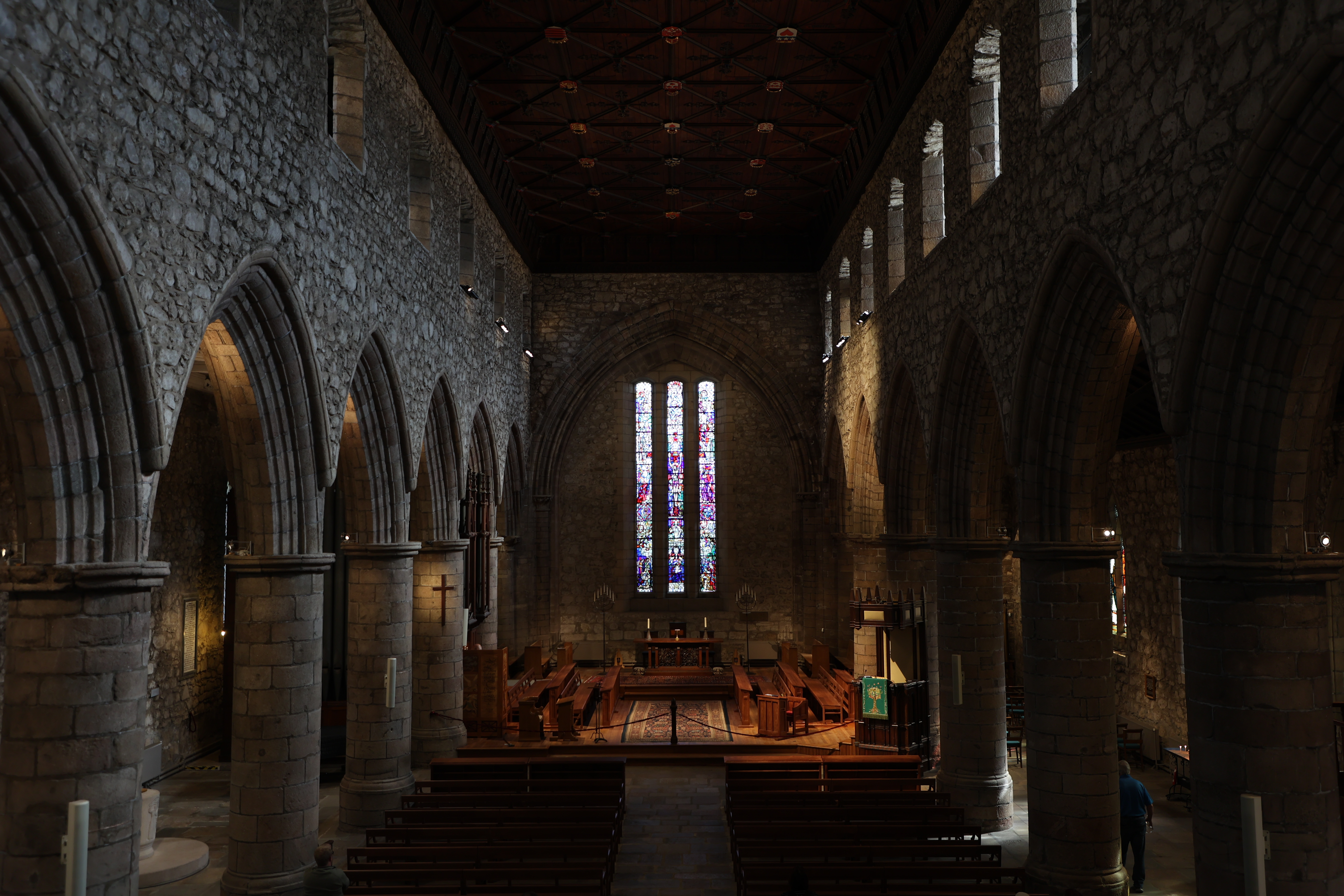
Interior of St Machar's

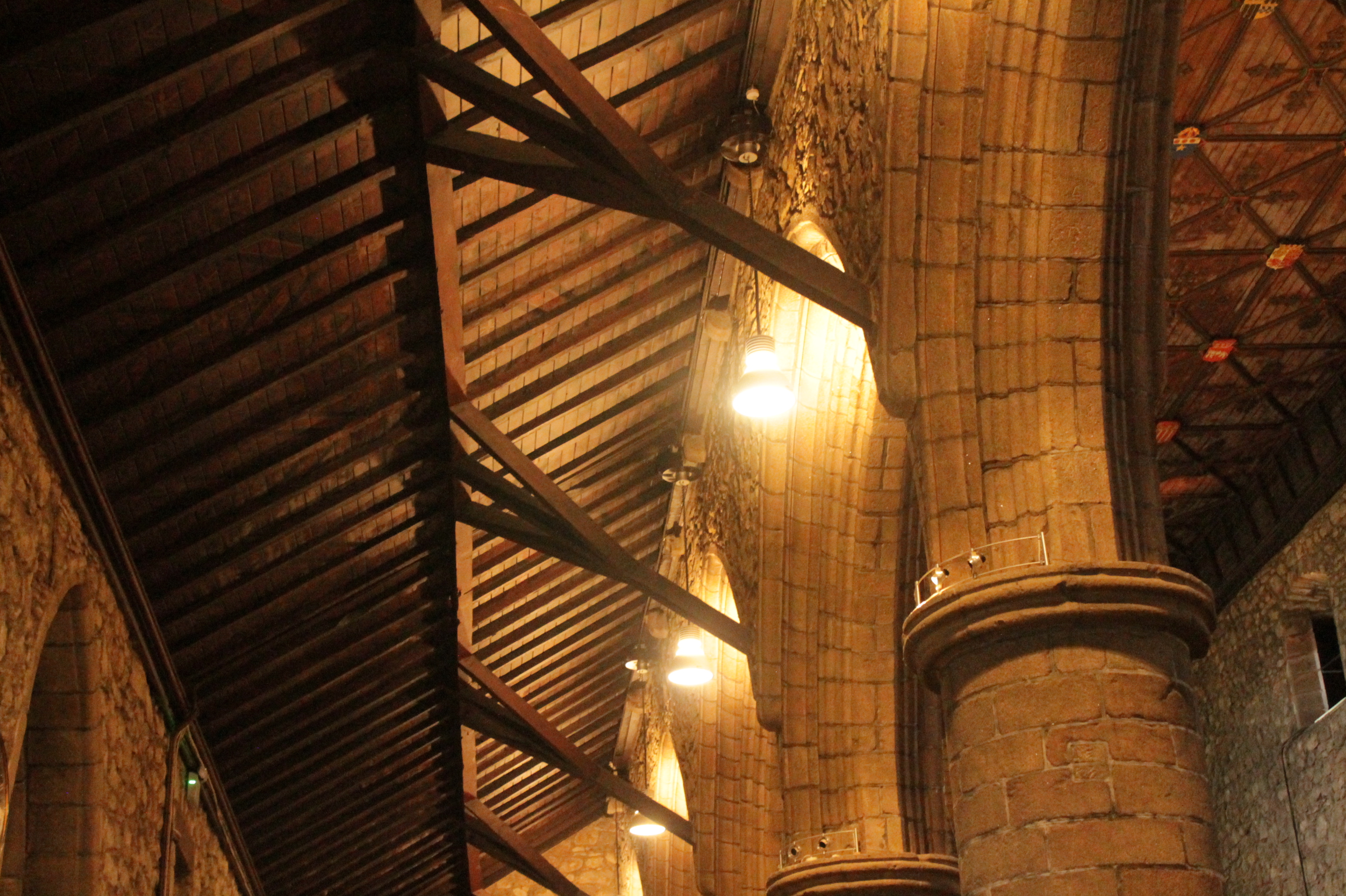
Roof structure over side aisles, St Machar's Cathedral

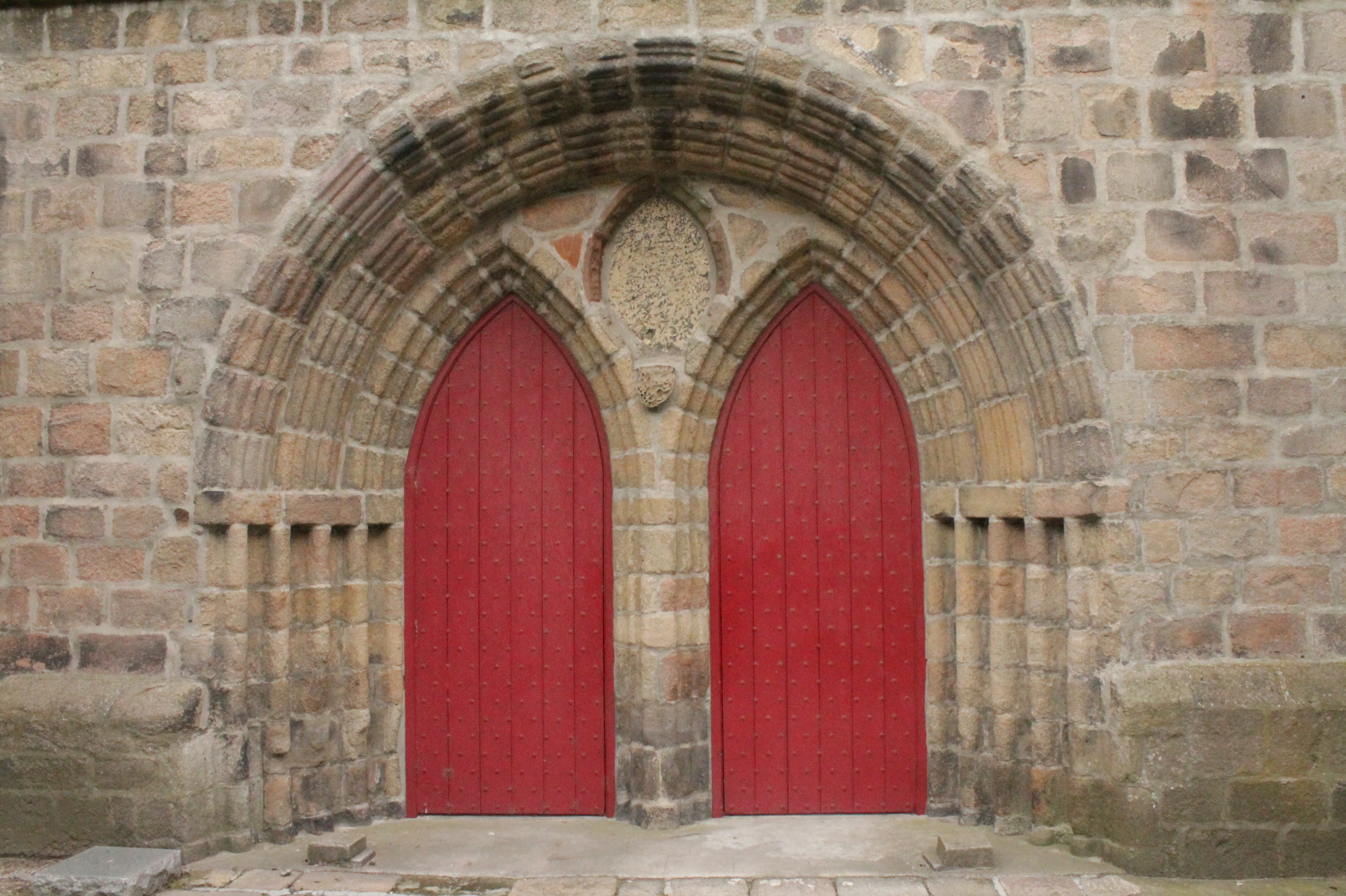
West door, St Machar's Cathedral

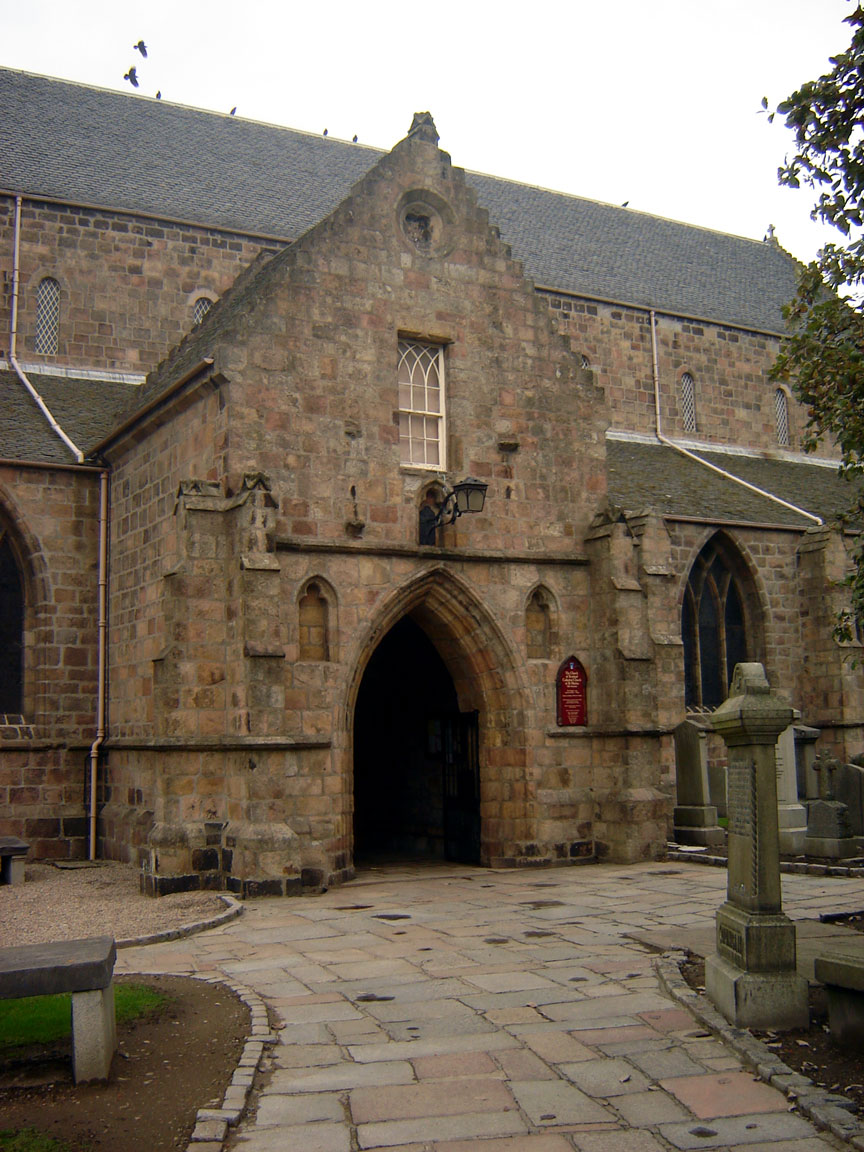
The cathedral entrance

St Machar's Cathedral is a Church of Scotland church in Aberdeen, Scotland, located to the north of the city centre, in the former burgh of Old Aberdeen. Technically, St Machar's is no longer a cathedral but rather a high kirk, as it has not been the seat of a bishop since 1690.

== History ==
St Machar is said to have been a companion of St Columba on his journey to Iona. A fourteenth-century legend tells how God (or St Columba) told Machar to establish a church where a river bends into the shape of a bishop's crosier before flowing into the sea. The River Don bends in this way just below where the cathedral now stands. According to legend, St Machar founded a site of worship in Old Aberdeen in about 580. Machar's church was superseded by a Norman cathedral in 1131, shortly after David I transferred the see from Mortlach to Aberdeen. Almost nothing of that original cathedral survives; a lozenge-decorated base for a capital supporting one of the architraves can be seen in the Charter Room in the present church.

After the execution of William Wallace in 1305, his body was cut up and sent to different corners of the country to warn other dissenters. His left quarter ended up in Aberdeen and is buried in the walls of the cathedral.

At the end of the thirteenth century Bishop Henry Cheyne decided to extend the church, but the work was interrupted by the Scottish Wars of Independence. Cheyne's progress included piers for an extended choir at the transept crossing. These pillars, with decorated capitals of red sandstone, are still visible at the east end of the present church. Though worn by exposure to the elements after the collapse of the cathedral's central tower, these capitals are among the finest stone carvings of their date to survive in Scotland. Bishop Alexander Kininmund II demolished the Norman cathedral in the late 14th century, and began the nave, including the granite columns and the towers at the western end. Bishop Henry Lichtoun completed the nave, the west front and the northern transept, and made a start on the central tower. Bishop Ingram Lindsay completed the roof and the paving stones in the later part of the fifteenth century. Further work was done over the next fifty years by Thomas Spens, William Elphinstone and Gavin Dunbar; Dunbar is responsible for the heraldic ceiling and the two western spires.

The chancel was demolished in 1560 during the Scottish Reformation. The bells and lead from the roof were sent to be sold in Holland, but the ship sank near Girdle Ness. The central tower and spire collapsed in 1688, in a storm, and this destroyed the choir and transepts. The west arch of the crossing was then filled in, and worship carried on in the nave only; the current church consists only of the nave and aisles of the earlier building.

The ruined transepts and crossing are under the care of Historic Environment Scotland, and contain an important group of late medieval bishops' tombs, protected from the weather by modern canopies. The cathedral is chiefly built of outlayer granite. On the unique flat panelled ceiling of the nave (first half of the 16th century) are the heraldic shields of the contemporary kings of Europe, and the chief earls and bishops of Scotland.

The cathedral is an example of a fortified kirk, with twin towers, believed to have been inspired by the central tower of Perth's St John's Kirk, built in the fashion of fourteenth-century tower houses. Their walls have the strength to hold spiral staircases to the upper floors and battlements. The spires which presently crown the towers were added in the 15th century. Bishops Gavin Dunbar and Alexander Galloway built the western towers and installed the heraldic ceiling.

Notable figures buried in the cathedral cemetery include the author J.J. Bell, Robert Brough, Gavin Dunbar, Robert Laws, a missionary to Malawi and William Ogilvie of Pittensear—the ‘rebel professor’.

St Machar's Cathedral has been featured in BBC TV's Songs of Praise.

== Ministry ==
The minister from 2004 to 2011 was the Reverend Dr Alan D. Falconer, who previously worked with the Secretariat of the World Council of Churches in Geneva. In 2011 the Reverend Jane Barron became the first female minister of St Machar's Cathedral. She was formerly minister at St Andrew's Church, Jerusalem and Stobswell Parish Church, Dundee. In 2015 Rev Barry Dunsmore became minister of St Machar's Cathedral. Since 2021, the minister has been Sarah Brown.

Notable past ministers include:

- James Lawson first Presbyterian minister 1569 to 1572 – translated to St Giles in Edinburgh to replace John Knox, Moderator in 1580
- Alexander Arbuthnot from 1574 to 1596 – also Principal of King's College, Aberdeen, Moderator in 1573 and 1577
- David Rait 1598 to 1632, Moderator of Synod and Moderator of the Aberdeen General Assembly of 1605
- Alexander Scrogie 1621 to 1640
- William Strachan 1640 to 1653
- John Seaton 1656 to 1662
- Alexander Scrogie (secundus) 1659 to 1661
- Alexander Middleton 1661 to 1665 became Principal of King's College, Aberdeen
- Robert Reynold 1665 to 1670 also Rector of King's College, Aberdeen
- George Strachan (son of William) 1672 to 1678
- George Chalmers 1729 to 1745 also Principal of King's College, Aberdeen
- Patrick Forbes second charge 1816 to 1847, Moderator in 1829

== Conservation and restoration ==
There has been considerable investment in recent years in restoration work and the improvement of the display of historic artefacts at the cathedral. The battlements of the western towers, incomplete for several centuries, have been renewed to their original height and design, greatly improving the appearance of the exterior. Meanwhile, within the building, a number of important stone monuments have been displayed to advantage. These include a possibly 7th–8th-century cross-slab from Seaton (the only surviving evidence from Aberdeen of Christianity at such an early date); a rare 12th century sanctuary cross-head; and several well-preserved late medieval effigies of cathedral clergy, valuable for their detailed representation of contemporary dress. A notable modern addition to the cathedral's artistic treasures is a carved wooden triptych commemorating John Barbour, archdeacon of Aberdeen (d. 1395), author of The Brus.

In 1987, bells from the deconsecrated St Stephen's Church, Ealing were restored by Eayre & Smith and installed in St Machar's. It is now one of the few churches in Scotland to have a set of bells designed for change ringing.

In 2020 the cathedral carried out a £1.85m project to re-slate the roof, clean the heraldic ceiling, and repair some of the stained glass windows.

== Stained glass ==
Scots law and religious convention did not allow the re-introduction of stained glass until 1866. There were no manufacturers or skills, so the earliest windows are of English creation.

The windows and their location inside the Cathedral are detailed below.

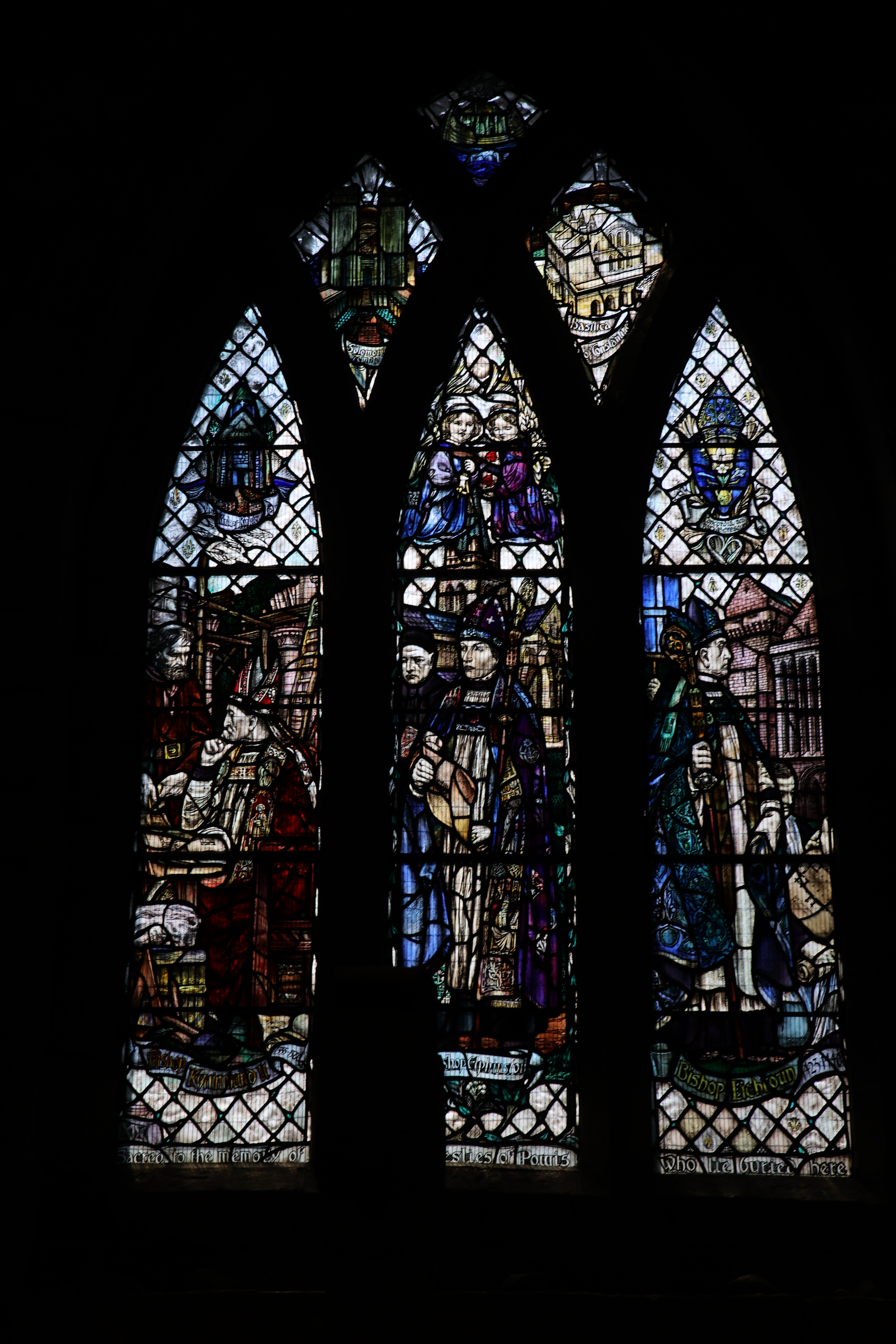
The Builder Bishops window by Douglas Strachan, St Machar's Cathedral

- Main west window, by Clayton and Bell 1870 – a set of seven narrow linear windows
- Main east window, by William Wilson 1953 – flanked by small windows by Daniel Cottier from 1870s
- North aisle, window 1 – by Marjorie Kemp 1920s – Parable of the Talents
- North aisle, window 2 – by Marjorie Kemp 1920s – Nativity as memorial to James W. H. Trail
- North aisle, window 3 – by Margaret Chilton 1920s – Dorcas window
- North aisle, window 4 – by Margaret Chilton 1920s – Serpent and the Crucifixion
- North aisle, window 5 – by Margaret Chilton 1920s – memorial to Marshall Gilchrist, organist
- North aisle, window 7 – by Daniel Cottier 1870s – Memorial to James Jameson and James Auldjo Jameson
- South aisle, window 1 – by Daniel Cottier 1870s
- South aisle, window 2 – by Daniel Cottier 1870s – Faith Hope and Charity: A memorial to George Jamesone, John Philip and William Dyce
- South aisle, window 3 – by Douglas Strachan 1913 – the Bishops Window
- South aisle, window 4 – by Clayton and Bell 1877 – as a memorial to Robert Smith DD
- South aisle, window 5 – by Douglas Strachan 1924 – as a war memorial, depicting St Michael and the dragon over Aberdeen Bay
- South aisle, window 6 – by Douglas Strachan 1908 – the Crombie window

== Ceiling ==
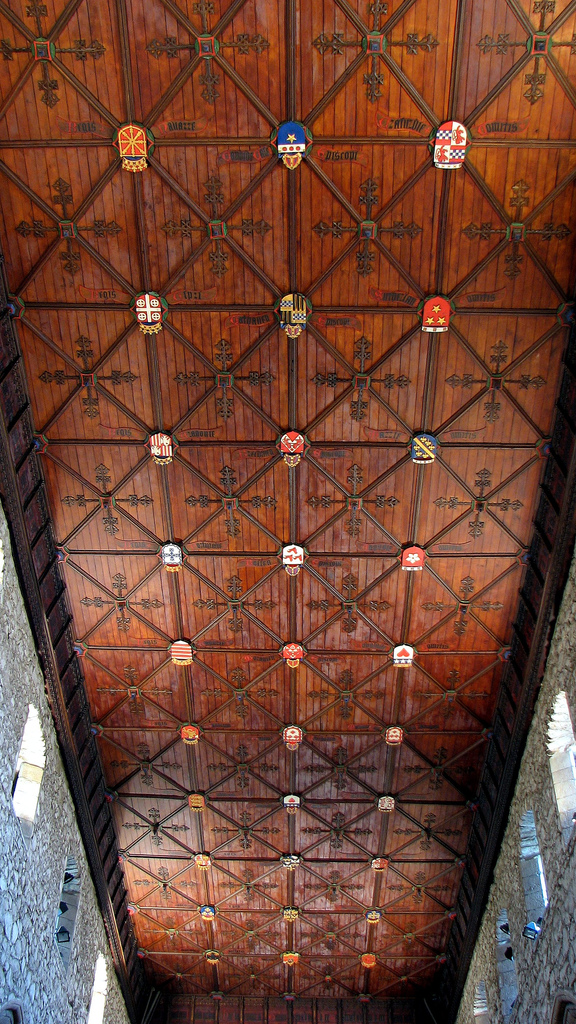
Heraldic ceiling of the cathedral

The heraldic ceiling features 48 coats of arms in three rows of sixteen. Among those shown are:

- Pope Leo X's coat of arms in the centre, followed in order of importance by those of the Scottish archbishops and bishops.
- the Prior of St Andrews, representing other Church orders.
- King's College, the westernmost shield.
- Henry VIII of England, James V of Scotland and multiple instances for the Holy Roman Emperor Charles V, who was also King of Spain, Aragon, Navarre and Sicily at the time the ceiling was created.
- St Margaret of Scotland, possibly as a stand-in for Margaret Tudor, James V's mother, whose own arms would have been the marshalled arms of England and Scotland.
- the arms of Aberdeen and of the families Gordon, Lindsay, Hay and Keith.

The ceiling is set off by a frieze which starts at the north-west corner of the nave and lists the bishops of the see from Nechtan in 1131 to William Gordon at the Reformation in 1560. This is followed by the Scottish monarchs from Malcolm II to Mary, Queen of Scots.

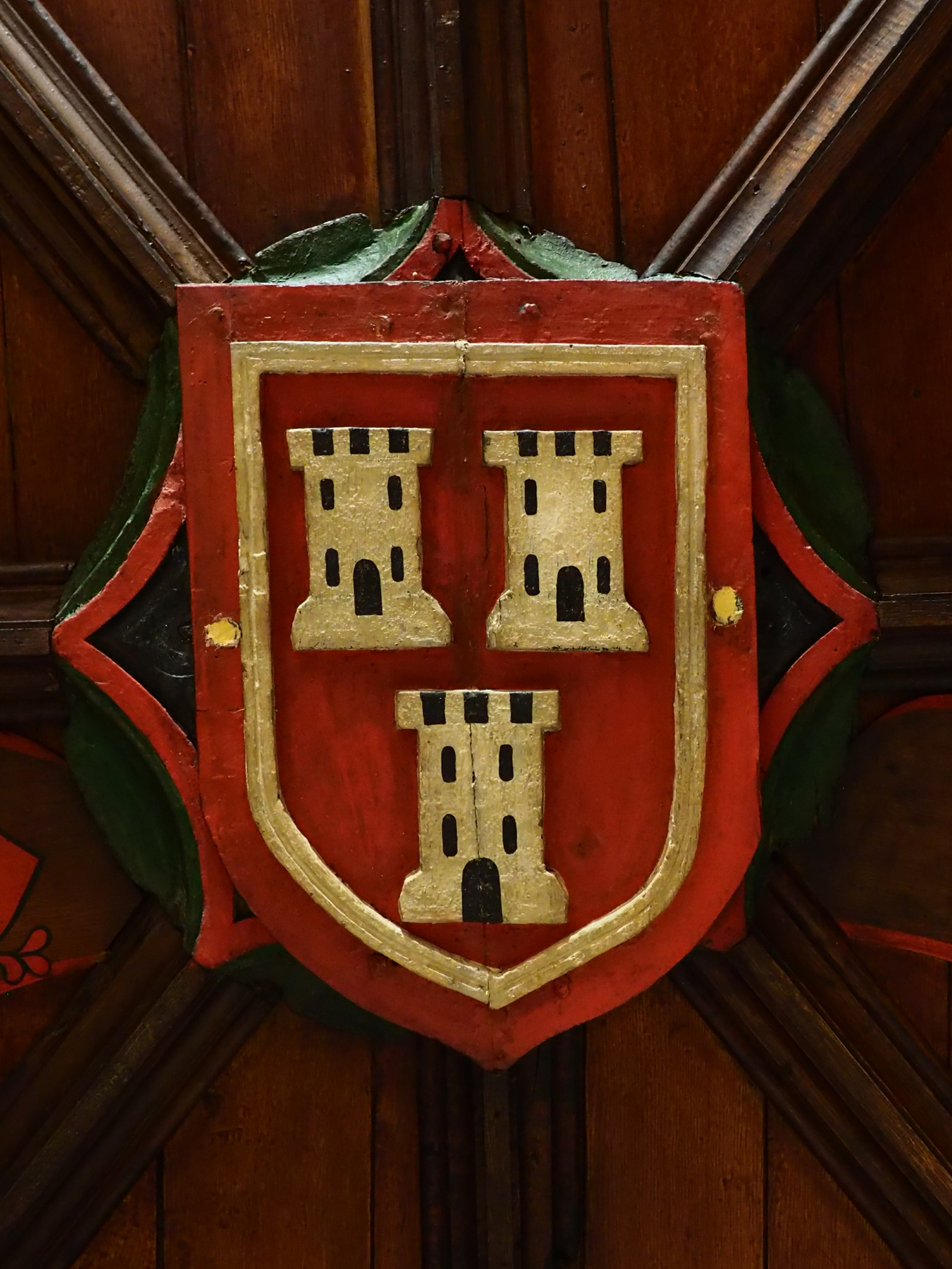
Royal Burgh of Aberdeen

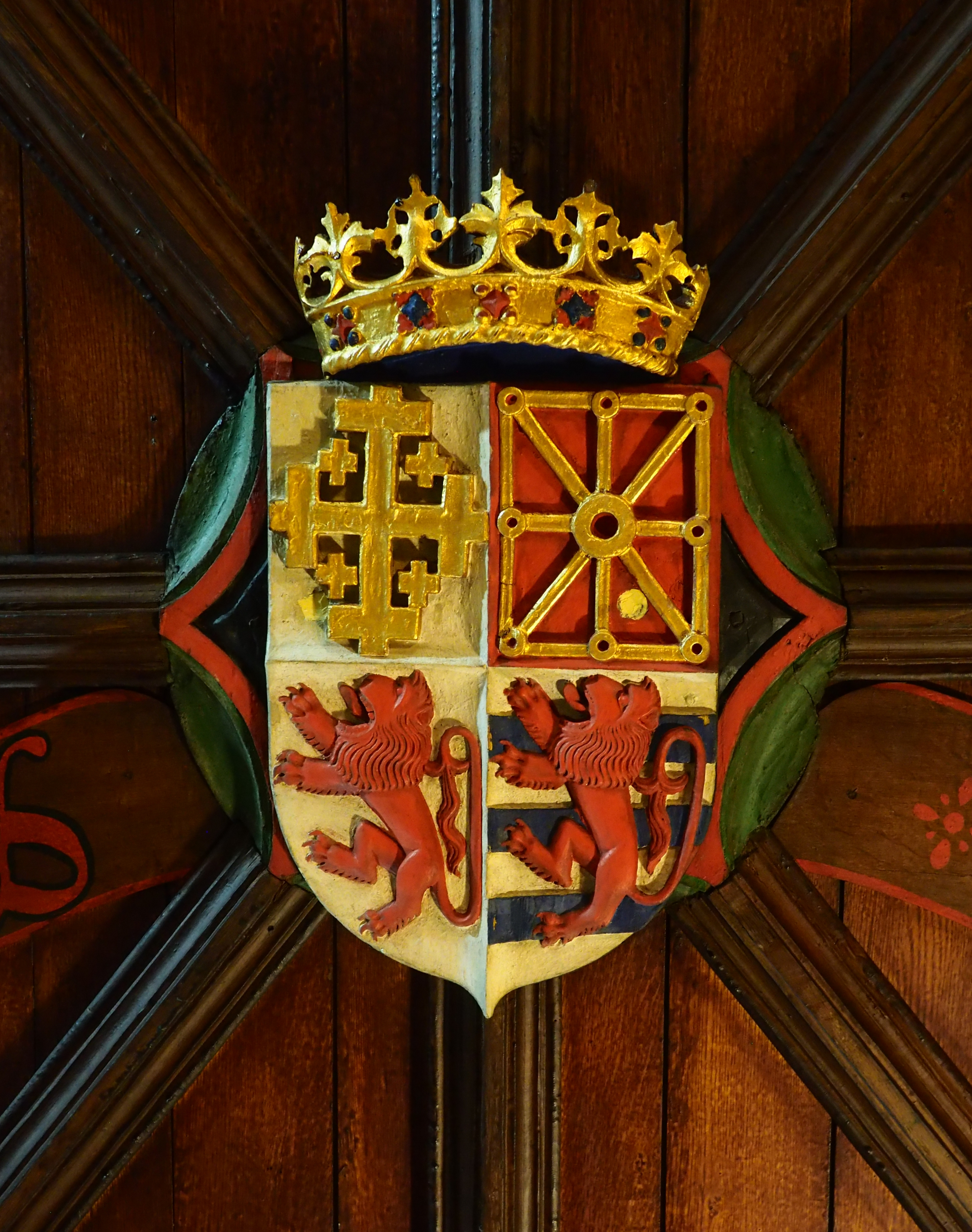
Charles V of Sicily

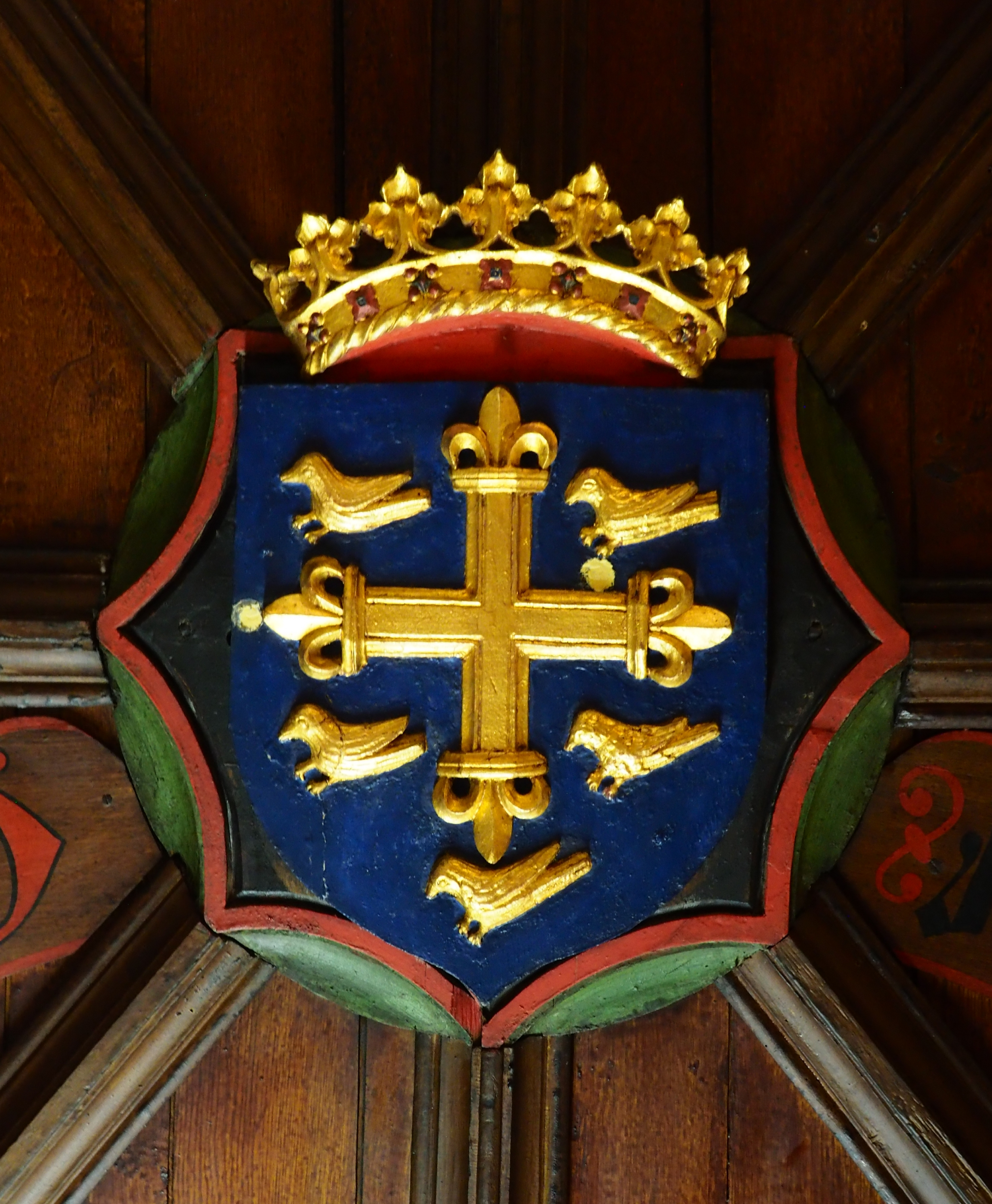
St Margaret of Scotland

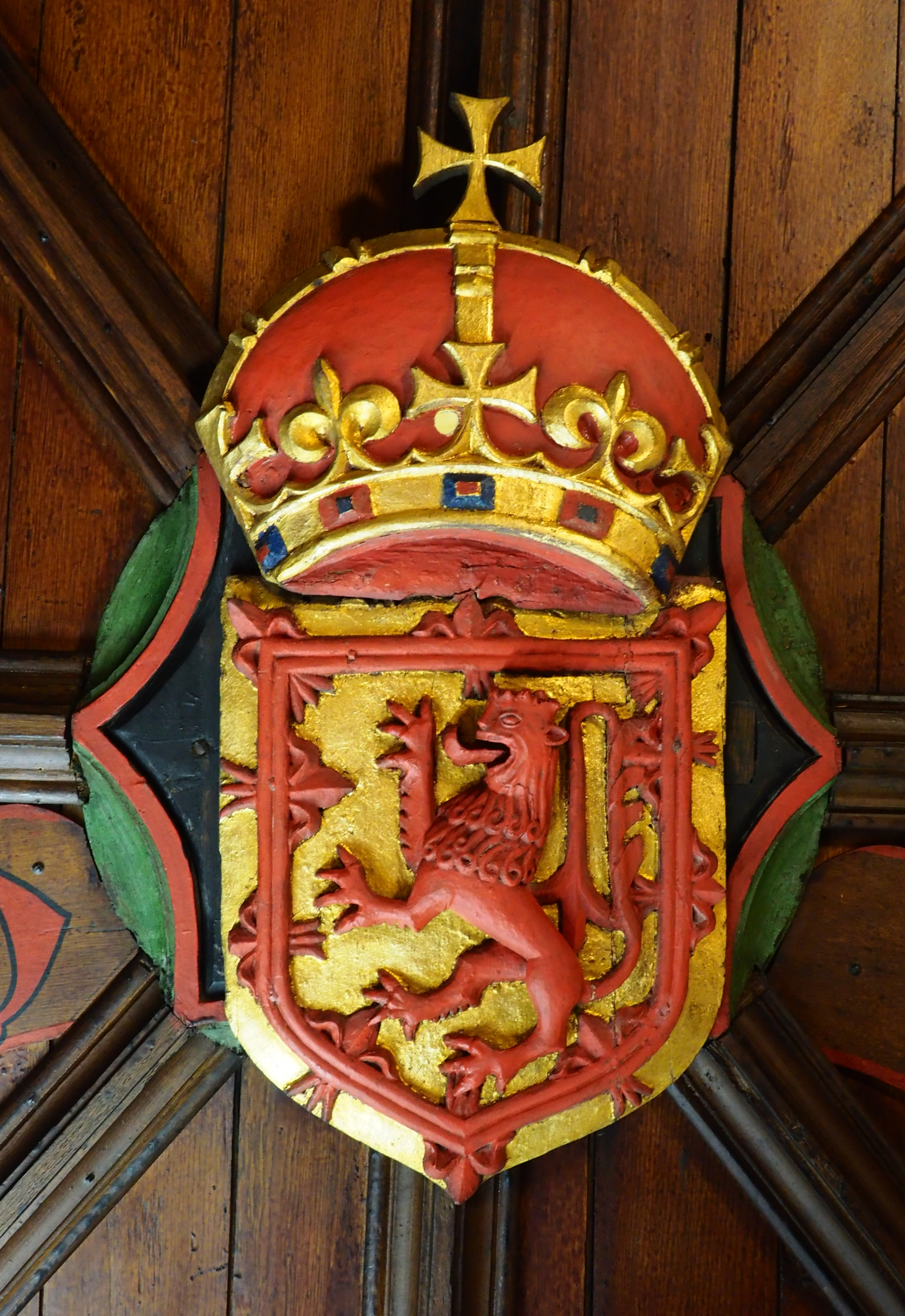
King James V of Scotland

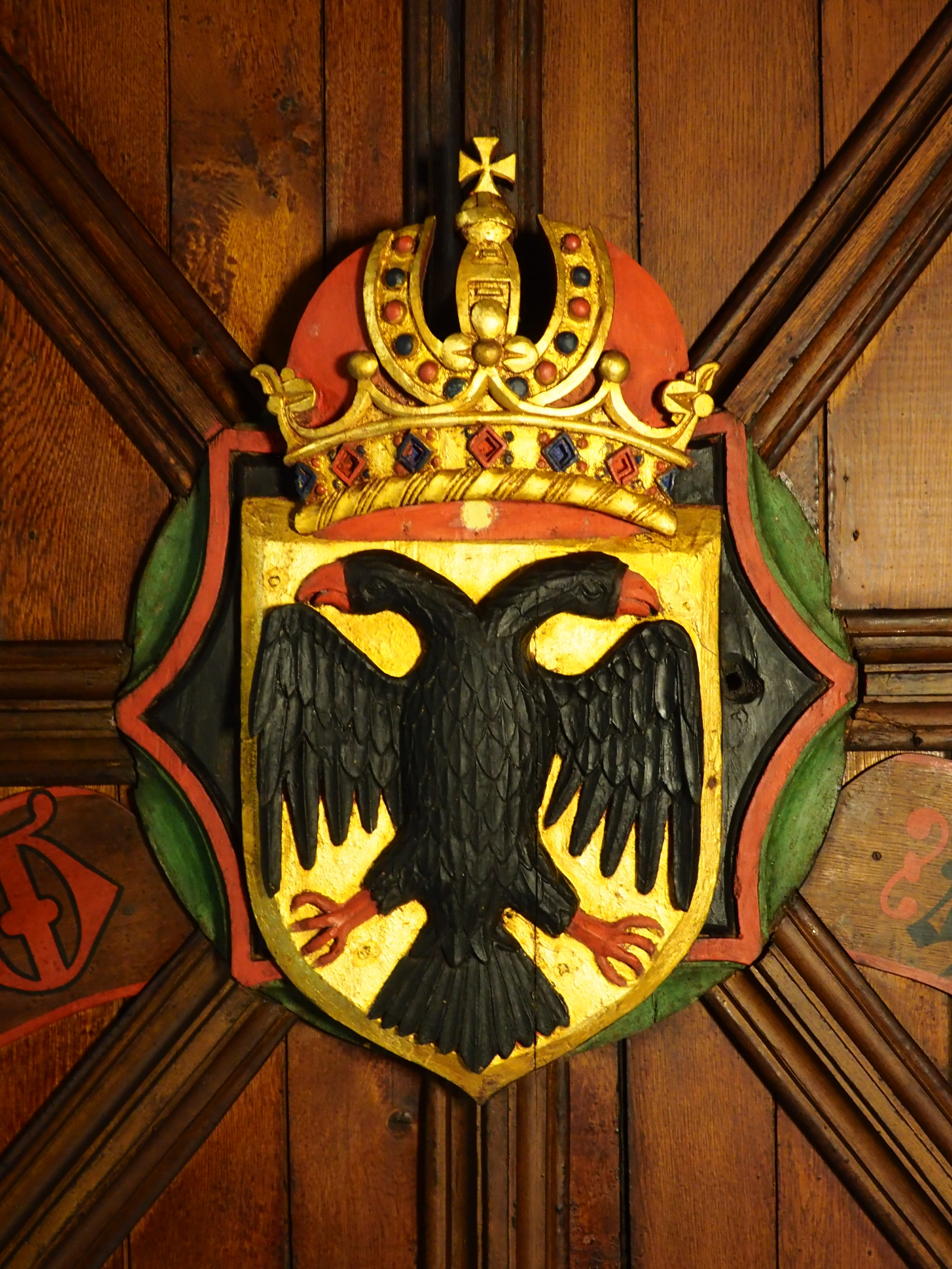
Charles V, Holy Roman Emperor

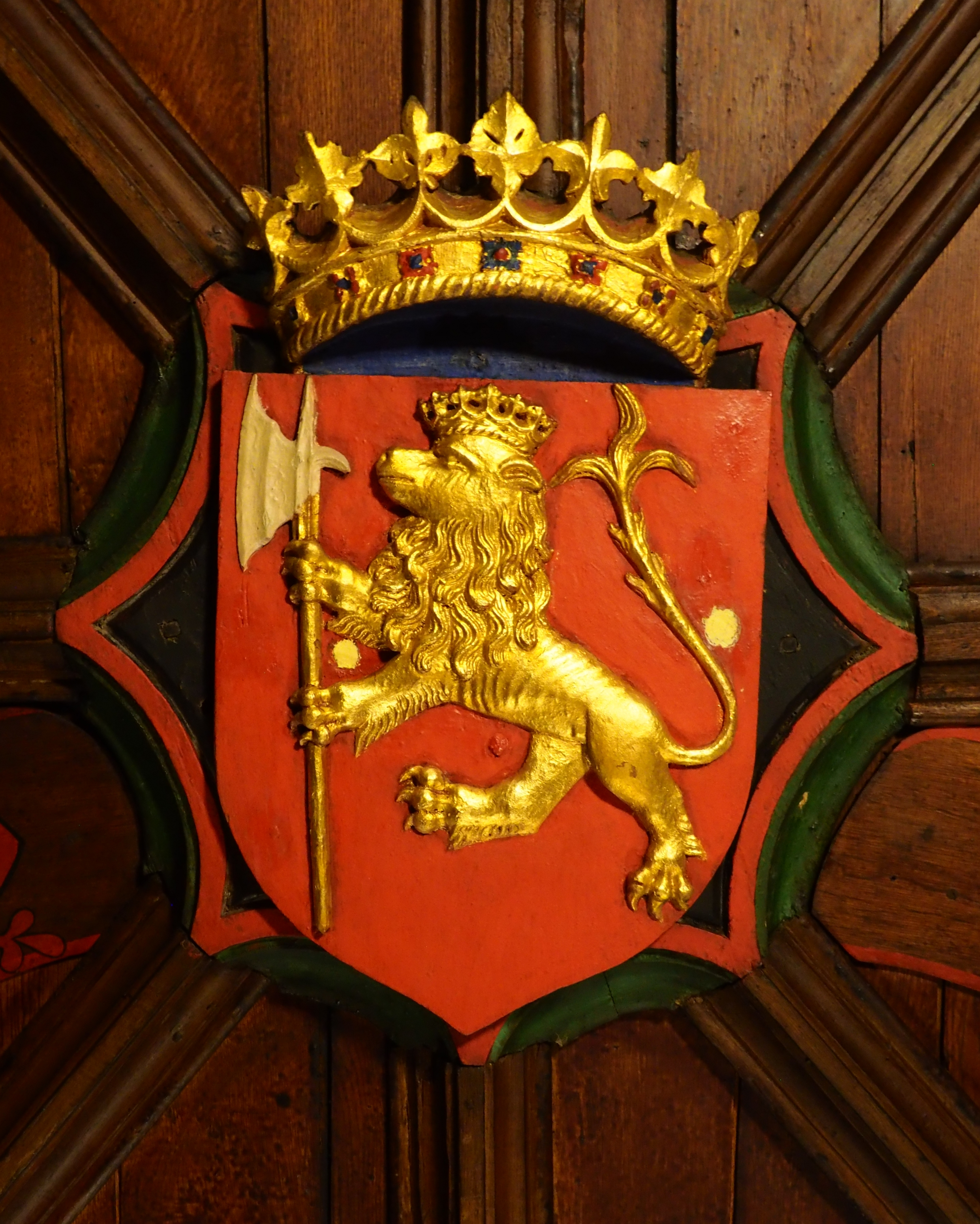
Christian II of Denmark

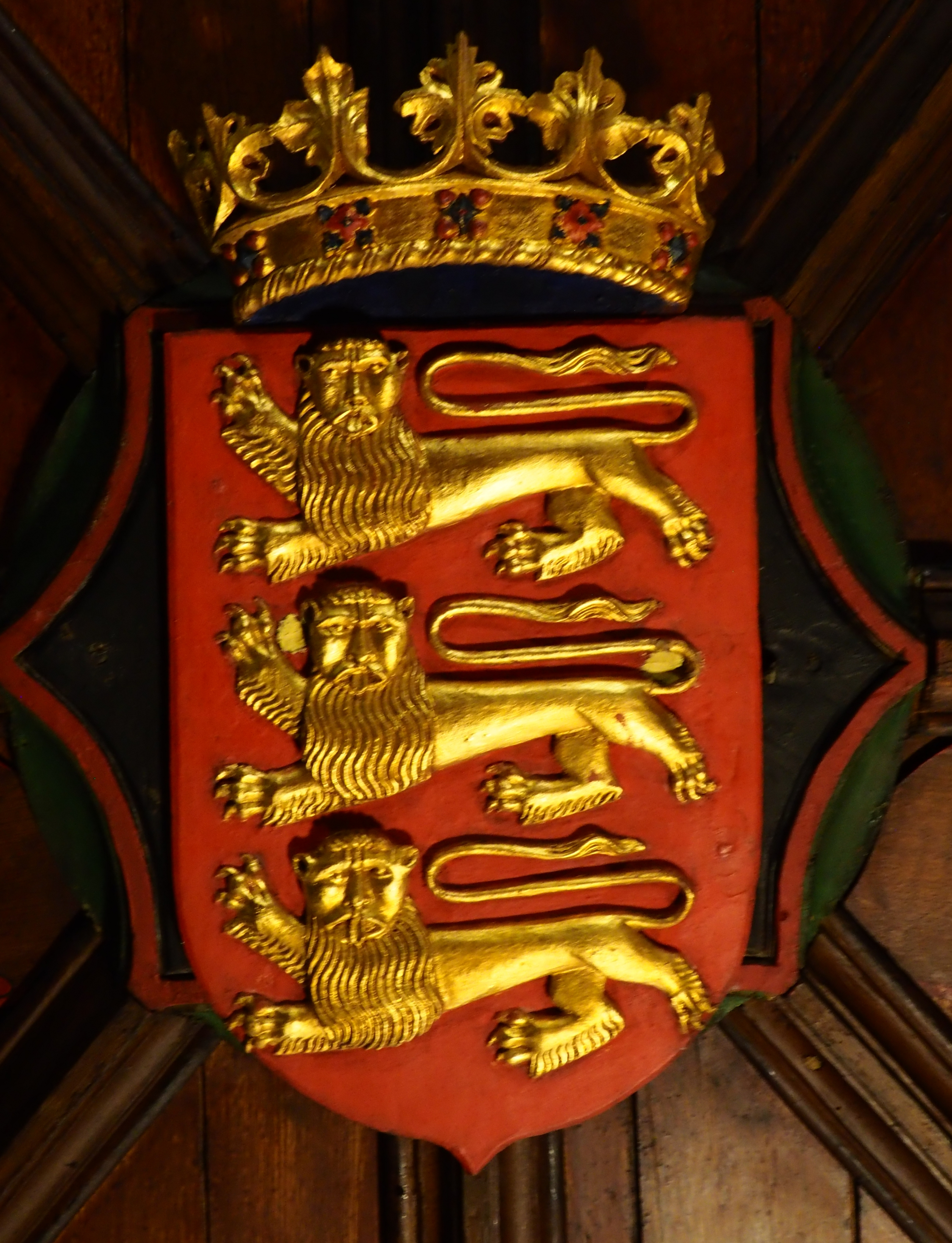
King Henry VIII of England

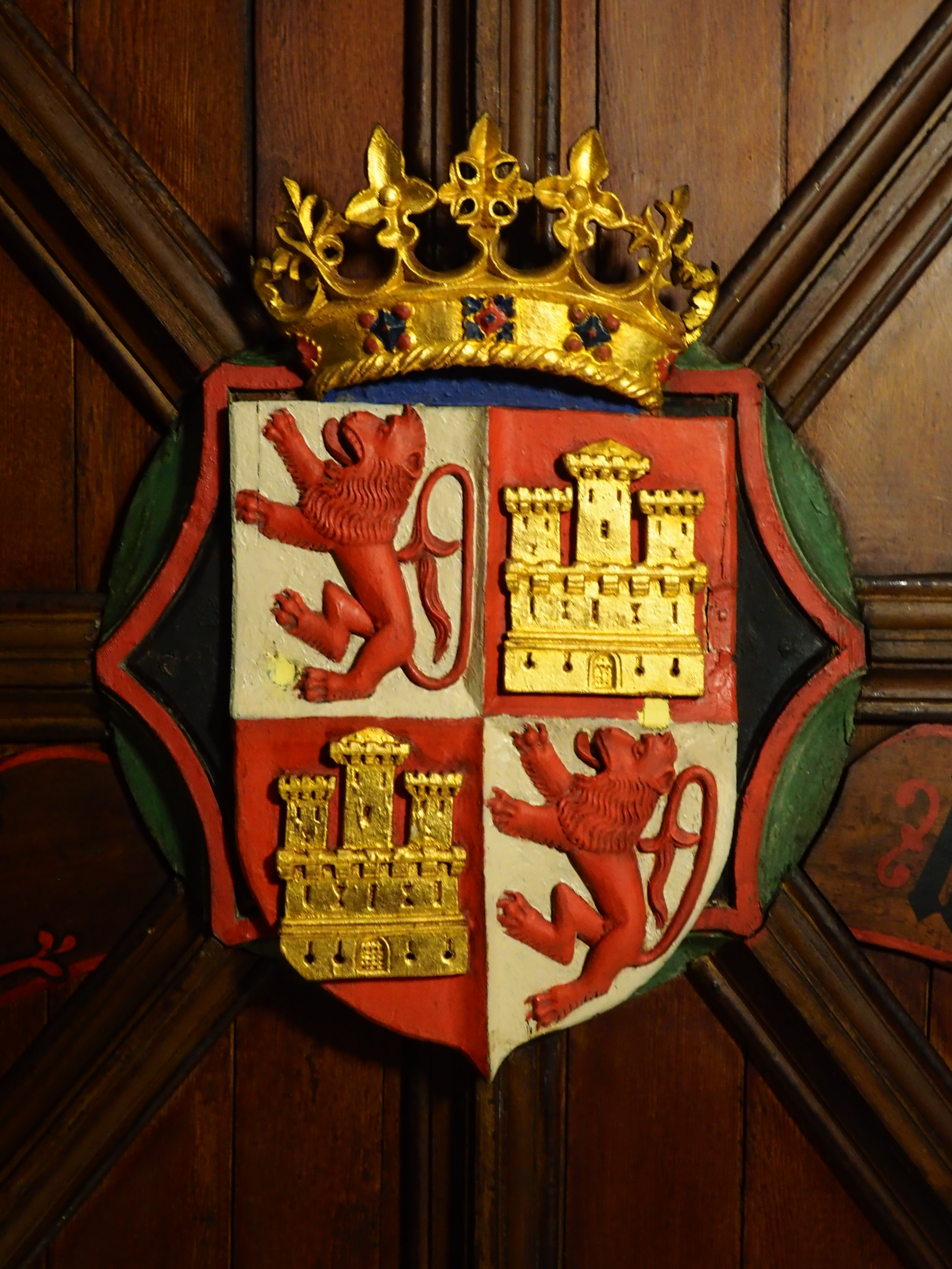
King Charles V of Spain

== Internal burials ==
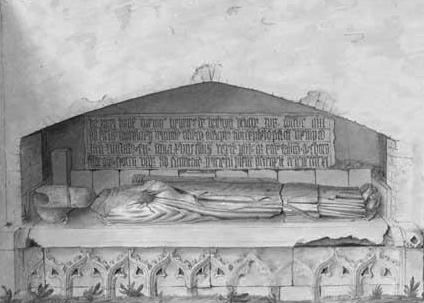
Tomb of Henry de Lichton prior to dismantling

- William Wallace, Bishop of Culter Railway (1422–1440)
- William de Deyn, Bishop of Aberdeen (1344–1350)
- John de Rait, Bishop of Aberdeen (1350–1355)
- Alexander de Kininmund, Bishop of Aberdeen (1355–1380)
- Henry de Lichton, Bishop of Aberdeen (1422–1440)
- Gavin Dunbar (Bishop of Aberdeen), 1518/9–32
- William Stewart (bishop of Aberdeen), 1532–1545
- William Gordon (bishop), Bishop of Aberdeen (1545–1577)
- Patrick Forbes, Bishop of Aberdeen (1618–1635)
- David Mitchel, Bishop of Aberdeen (1662–1663)
- Patrick Scougal, Bishop of Aberdeen (1664–1682)

== External burials ==
- Sir Harvey Adamson
- James Barron (harbour engineer)
- John Joy Bell author
- Robert Brough artist
- Very Rev Prof Peter Colin Campbell
- James Edward Crombie philanthropist
- John William Crombie MP
- George Dickie (botanist)
- Very Rev Patrick Forbes
- Sir William Hamilton Fyfe (memorial only)
- Rev George Garden
- William Duguid Geddes
- Very Rev Alexander Gerard
- James Giles RSA
- David Gill (astronomer)
- Prof John Harrower
- Jessie Seymour Irvine, hymn tune composer
- Rev Prof William Jack principal of King's College
- Very Rev John Marshall Lang
- James Leatham social reformer and author
- Bishop Henry Leighton
- William Leslie of Nethermuir (1802–1879) Lord Provost of Aberdeen
- John Lumsden
- Hector Munro MacDonald
- Very Rev Prof Roderick MacLeod (within the east enclosure)
- Rev Prof Duncan Mearns
- George Pirie (mathematician)
- Very Rev William Robinson Pirie
- Prof Hercules Scott
- James Augustus Sinclair, 16th Earl of Caithness
- Prof David Thomson (physicist)
- Lt General William Montgomerie Thomson (memorial only)
- Philip Tidyman
- Prof James W. H. Trail
- Very Rev Samuel Trail

== See also ==
- List of Church of Scotland parishes
- University of Aberdeen
- Bede House, Old Aberdeen
- Ray McAleese, Bishop Gavin Dunbar: Nobleman, Statesman, Catholic Bishop, Administrator and Philanthropist. ed. by Walter R. H. Duncan, Friends of St Machar, Occasional Publications, Series 2, No. 7 (Aberdeen: Friends of St Machar, 2013), p. 40.
