= William Jack (principal) =

- Born: 12 May 1768; Shetland
- Died: 9 February 1854 (aged 85); Aberdeen
- Burial place: St Machar's Cathedral
- Spouse: Grace Bolt
- Children: 10

Academic background
- Education: King's College, Aberdeen; University of Edinburgh

William Jack (1768–1854) was a Church of Scotland academic who served as Principal of King's College, Aberdeen and formed part of the committee that created the University of Aberdeen by merging Aberdeen's two colleges, King's College and Marischal College.

== Life ==
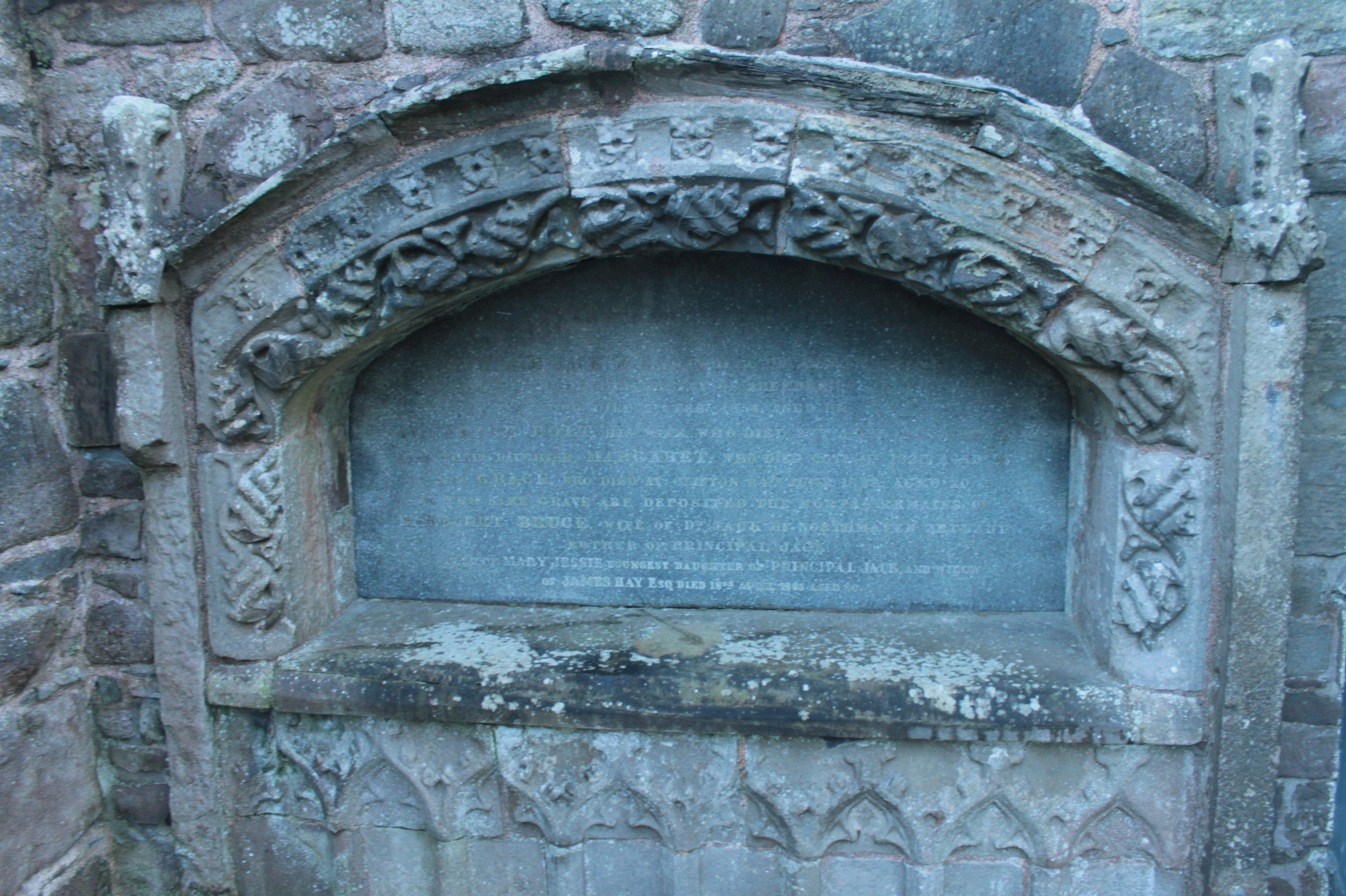
The grave of Rev Prof William Jack, St Machar's Cathedral, Aberdeen

Jack was born on 12 May 1768, the son of William Jack, minister of Northmavine on Shetland, by his wife Margaret Bruce. He was educated at King's College, Aberdeen, graduating MA in 1785. He then spent some years at the University of Edinburgh studying medicine, graduating with an MD. In 1788, he returned to King's College. He was appointed a "regent" (Fellow) in 1794. He became Sub-Principal in 1800 and Principal in 1815 in place of Roderick MacLeod.

He died on 9 February 1854 and is buried in a niche of the outer eastern enclosure at St Machar's Cathedral in north Aberdeen. Due to the impending merge his post as Principal was not filled. Although Jack did not live to see the merge, he was part of the committee set up to combine King's College with Marischal College to create the single entity of the University of Aberdeen in 1860.

== Family ==
In April 1794 he married Grace Bolt (1773–1850), daughter of the merchant Andrew Bolt of Lerwick. They had at least ten children, and several died in tragic circumstances:

- William Jack (1795–1822), botanist, died in Sumatra
- Charles Jack (1797–1867), Lieutenant at Battle of Waterloo, died in St. Louis, Missouri
- Eliza Jane (Jean) Jack (born 1799), married Sir Arthur Nicolson, 8th Baronet, of Lasswade
- Margaret (1801–1828)
- Robert Jack (1803–1874)
- Alexander Jack (1805–1857), killed in the Cawnpore Massacre
- Grace Jack (1808–1828), died at Clifton
- Margaret Janet (1810–1895), married James Hay of London
- Mary Jesse (1809–1895)
- Andrew Thomas William Jack (1822–1857), killed in the Cawnpore Massacre
