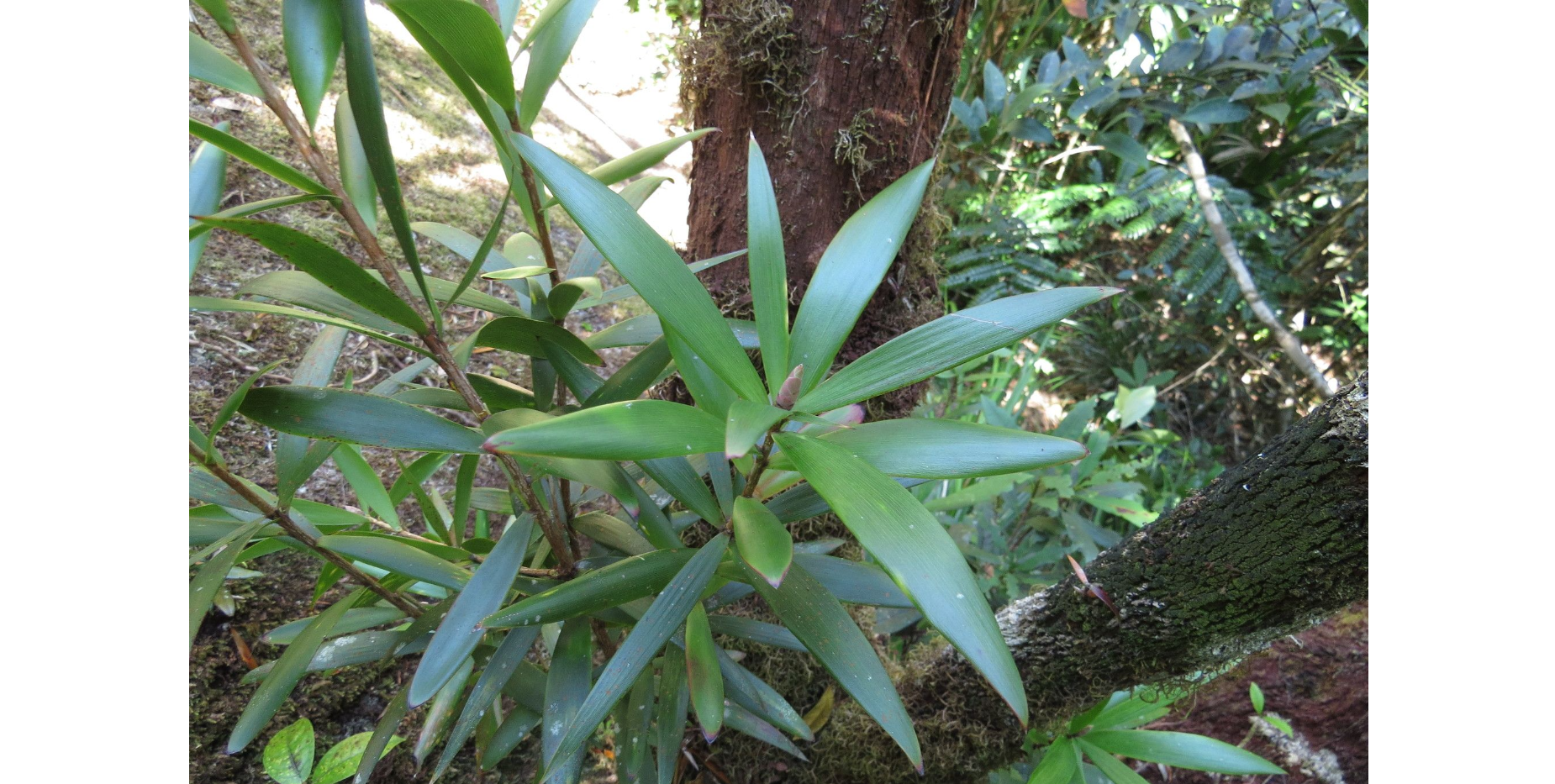

Conservation status
- Least Concern (IUCN 3.1)

Scientific classification
- Kingdom: Plantae
- Clade: Tracheophytes
- Clade: Angiosperms
- Clade: Eudicots
- Clade: Asterids
- Order: Ericales
- Family: Ericaceae
- Genus: Styphelia
- Species: S. malayana

Binomial name
- Styphelia malayana (Jack) J.J.Sm.
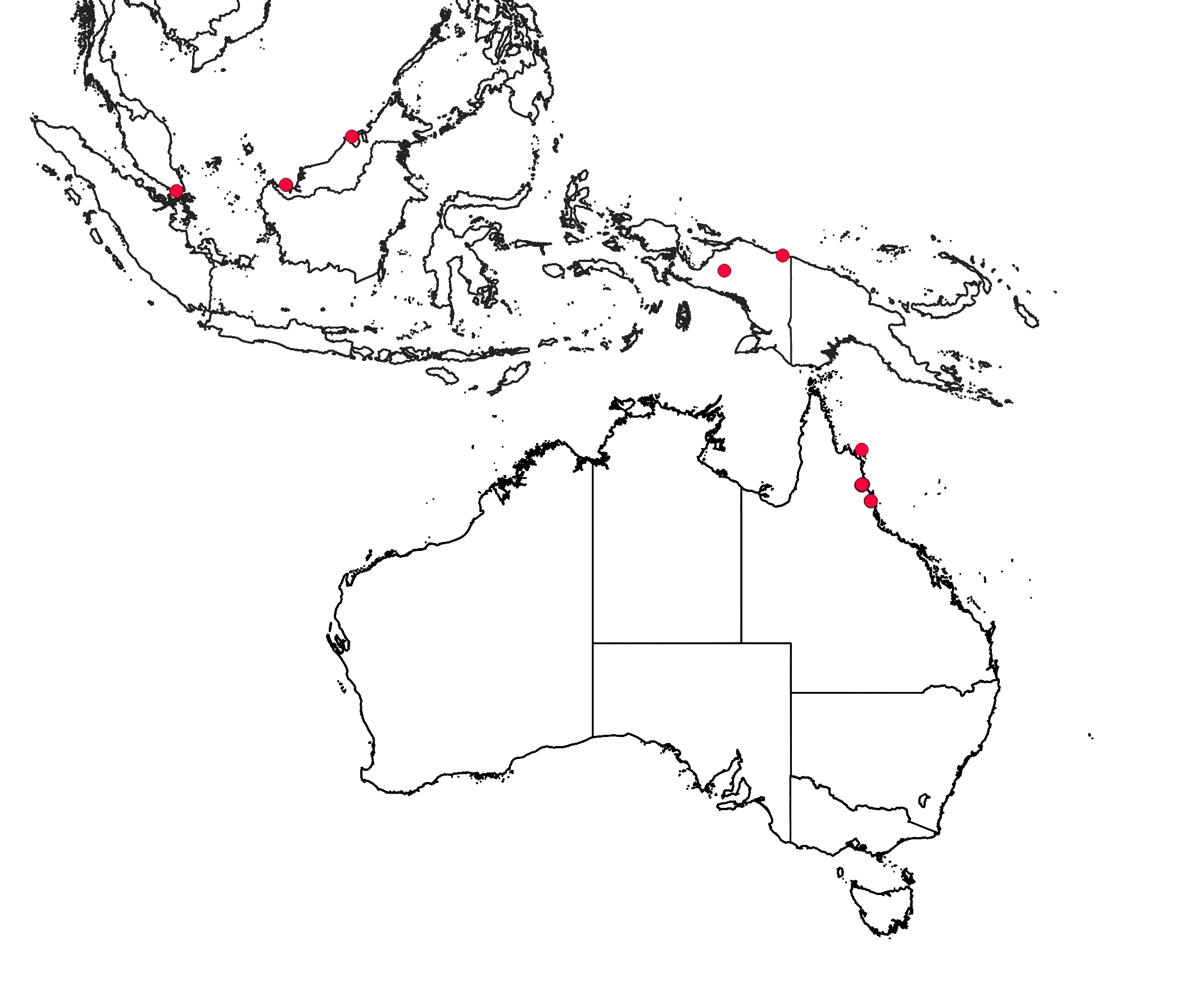
- Occurrence data from GBIF

Synonyms
- Leucopogon malayanus Jack; Styphelia malaica Spreng.

= Styphelia malayana =

Species of flowering plant

Styphelia malayana is an alpine plant in the family Ericaceae native to Myanmar, Thailand, Cambodia, Vietnam, the Malay Peninsula, Sumatra, Borneo and New Guinea. It was first formally described in 1820 as Leucopogon malayanum by William Jack in Malayan Miscellanies, who found abundant voucher material lodged at Singapore herbarium. In 1912, Johannes Jacobus Smith transferred the species to Styphelia as S. malayana.

The names of two subspecies are accepted by Plants of the World Online:

- Styphelia malayana subsp. novoguineensis Hislop, Crayn & Puente-Lel.
- Styphelia malayana (Jack) J.J.Sm.subsp. malayana

== Description ==
=== Styphelia malayana subsp. novoguineensis ===
This plant is usually found as a small multistemmed windswept tree but also occurs as a shrub. The leaves may be stalked or without stalks and vary considerably in size (40–120 mm by 8–20 mm). There are about 8-12 parallel leaf veins but no obvious midrib. The flowers occur in spikes and the calyx lobes are about 2 by 1.9 mm and have hairy margins. The stamen filaments are about 1.5 mm long with anthers about 0.6 by 0.2 mm. The ovary has 8-10 locules. The fruits are squashed globules (about 5-6 by 7–9 mm diameter), and the calyx persists at the base. This subspecies is found only in north-east Queensland and New Guinea.

=== Styphelia malayana subsp. malayana ===
This subspecies is called Styphelia malayana var. malayana by Hermann Sleumer. It differs from S. malayana subsp. novoguineensis in that it does not have the long hairs at the top of the ovary and at the base of the style of S. malayana subsp. novoguineensis. Additionally, the ranges of the two subspecies do not overlap.
