= Elphinstone Hall =

Aberdeen University building

Coordinates: 57°9′50″N 2°7′30″W

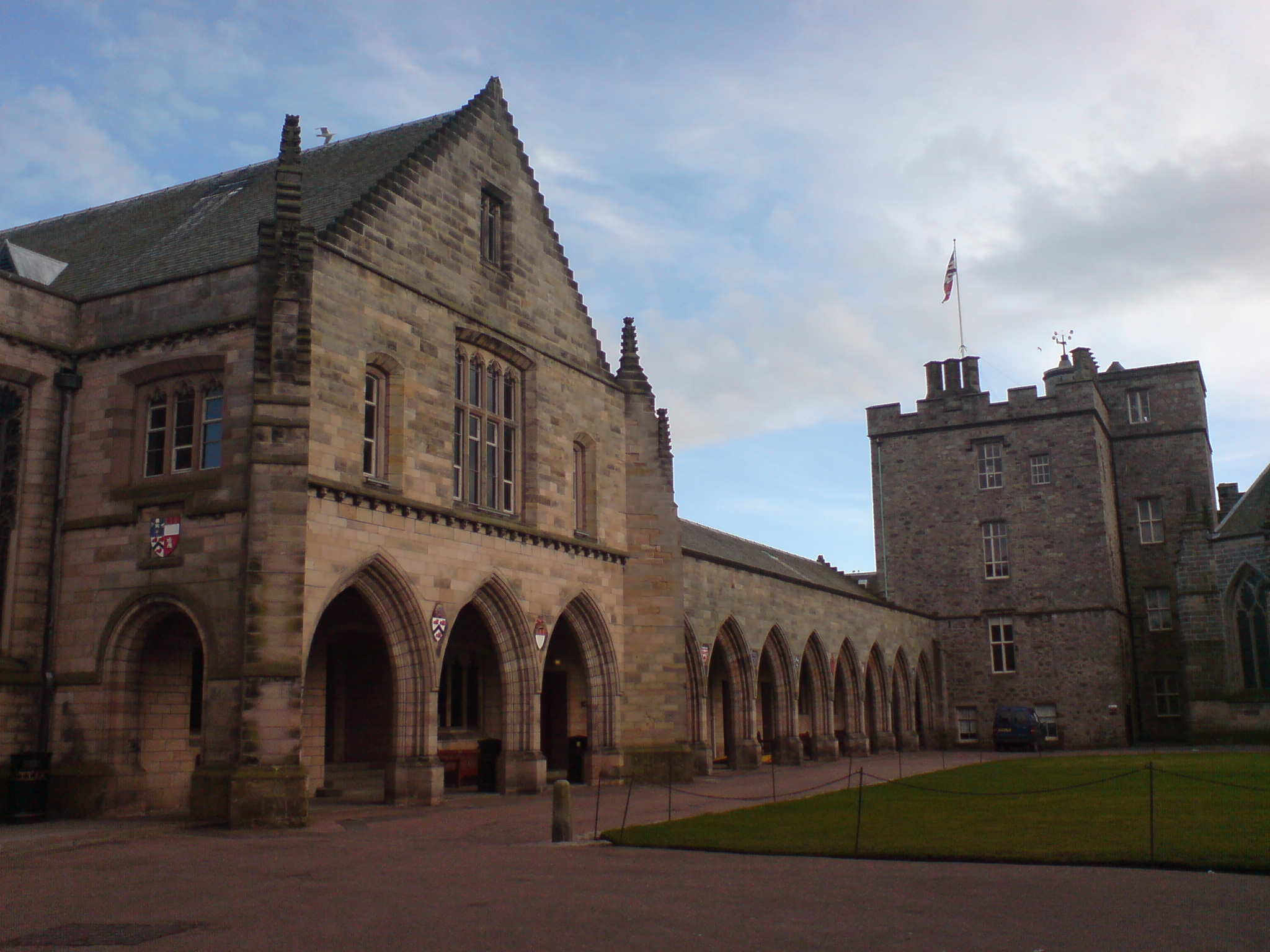
Elphinstone Hall, Aberdeen

Elphinstone Hall is a large hall belonging to the University of Aberdeen, located at their King's College campus in Old Aberdeen. It is a 20th-century building which replaced the "Common Hall" and is named after Bishop William Elphinstone, the founder of the university. An arcade dominates the front of the building, behind which lie a reception area and then the large, wood-panelled hall with hammerbeam roof. Portraits of founding fathers of the university and other key figures from its history line the walls. A related suite of luxurious rooms called the Linklater Rooms run along the arcade, named after writer Eric Linklater, a graduate of the university. The complex includes catering facilities as well as cloakroom facilities. In front of the hall is a large lawn, which is popular with students and staff of the university in summer. In winter, the university places a large Christmas tree on this lawn. The hall is currently the venue for all University of Aberdeen graduation ceremonies.

== History ==
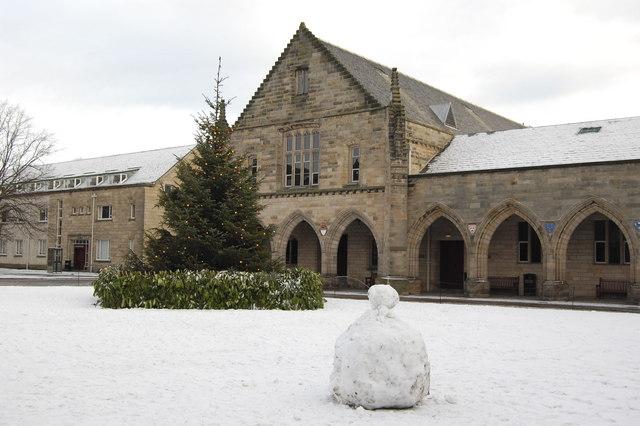
Christmas tree outside Elphinstone Hall

Built in 1931 and designed by architect Alexander Marshall Mackenzie (who designed many of Aberdeen's iconic granite buildings) in a style in keeping with the adjoining King's College buildings and chapel, some of which date back to the 16th century. It also blended with the New Kings lecture rooms on the other side of the quadrangle which were built in 1913 to the same style. Like all these, Elphinstone Hall was constructed of sandstone (rather than the granite that characterises most buildings in Aberdeen). Stones were used from Castle Newe in Strathdon which was built in 1831 and demolished in 1927. The coats of arms above the arcade belong to some of the benefactors and local bodies. Adjoining Elphinstone Hall are the Linklater Rooms which are home to the "Linklater Collection" of 20th-century paintings, kindly donated by the widow of writer Eric Linklater.

== Purpose Today ==
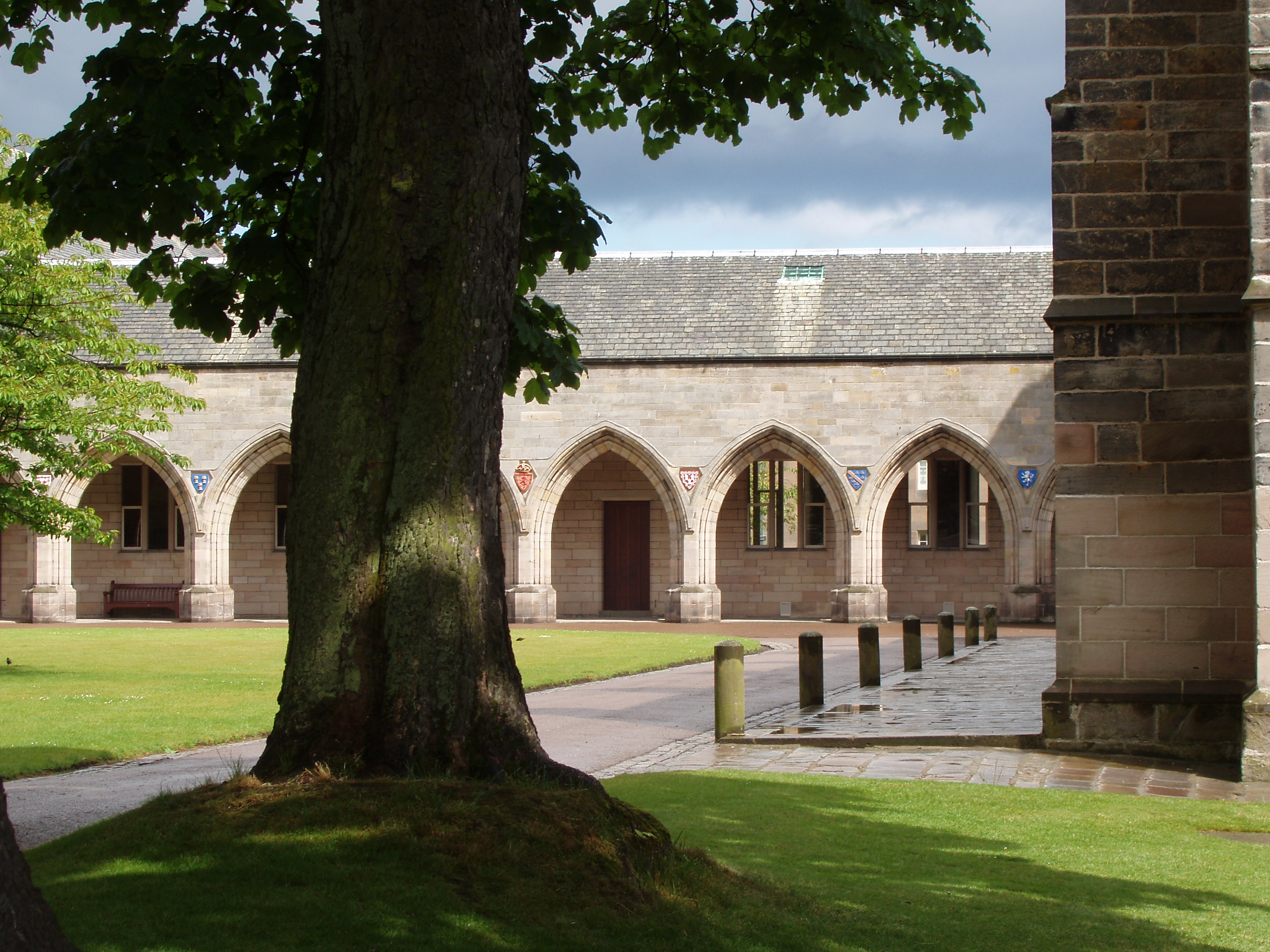
Elphinstone Hall and Linklater Rooms, seen from tree next to King's College Chapel

It was initially used as an academic and exam venue, and during the mid-20th century acted as a student dining/lunch hall. Today it is still used for exams, but also for large university events. These include conferences, fairs, ceilidhs, student events, and other functions. It can also be hired for wedding receptions and corporate events. Also, since renovation work began at Marischal College, Elphinstone Hall was the venue for all university graduation ceremonies until winter 2021 when graduations moved to the P&J Live.

The hall also provides a focal point for the annual May festival, a highly successful mixed-focus festival drawing famous guests such as the physicist Brian Cox, Pat Nevin and Sir Tony Robinson. It is the location of a number of student-run ceilidhs throughout the year, including those of the International and Celtic Societies, as well as other student events.
