= Alexander Jack =

Scottish army officer in the East India Company (1805–1857)

Alexander Jack CB
- Born: 19 October 1805; Aberdeen, Scotland
- Died: 27 June 1857 (aged 51); Cawnpore, India
- Military career
- Allegiance: United Kingdom; East India Company
- Branch: Bengal Army: Bengal Native Infantry
- Service years: 1824–1857
- Rank: Brigadier
- Conflicts: First Sikh War; Battle of Aliwal; Second Sikh War; Battle of Chillianwala; Battle of Goojerat; Indian Mutiny; Siege of Cawnpore †

Alexander Jack, CB (19 October 1805 – 27 June 1857) was a Scottish officer in the service of the East India Company in the Bengal Army. He was educated at King's College, Aberdeen. He was with the 30th Bengal Native Infantry at Aliwal, and acted as brigadier of the force sent against Kangra, in 1846, during the First Anglo-Sikh War. He commanded his battalion in the Second Sikh War; was promoted colonel in 1854, and brigadier in 1857. He was treacherously shot and killed during the Cawnpore massacre in June 1857.

== Origins ==
Alexander Jack was a grandson of William Jack, the minister of Northmavine, Shetland. His father, the Rev. William Jack (died 9 February 1854) (M.D., Edinburgh), was sub-principal of University and King's College, Aberdeen, from 1800 to 1815, and principal from 1815 to 1854. Principal Jack married in 1794 Grace, daughter of Andrew Bolt of Lerwick, Shetland, by whom he had six children.

Alexander, one of four sons, was born in Old Machar, Aberdeen, on 19 October 1805, was a student in mathematics and philosophy at King's College, Aberdeen, in 1820–1822, and was remembered by a class-fellow who survived him as a tall, handsome, soldierly young man.

== Career ==
Jack obtained a Bengal cadetship in 1823, was appointed ensign in the 30th Bengal Native Infantry on 23 May 1824, and became lieutenant in the regiment on 30 August 1825, captain on 2 December 1832, and major and brevet-lieutenant-colonel on 19 June 1846.

=== First Sikh War ===
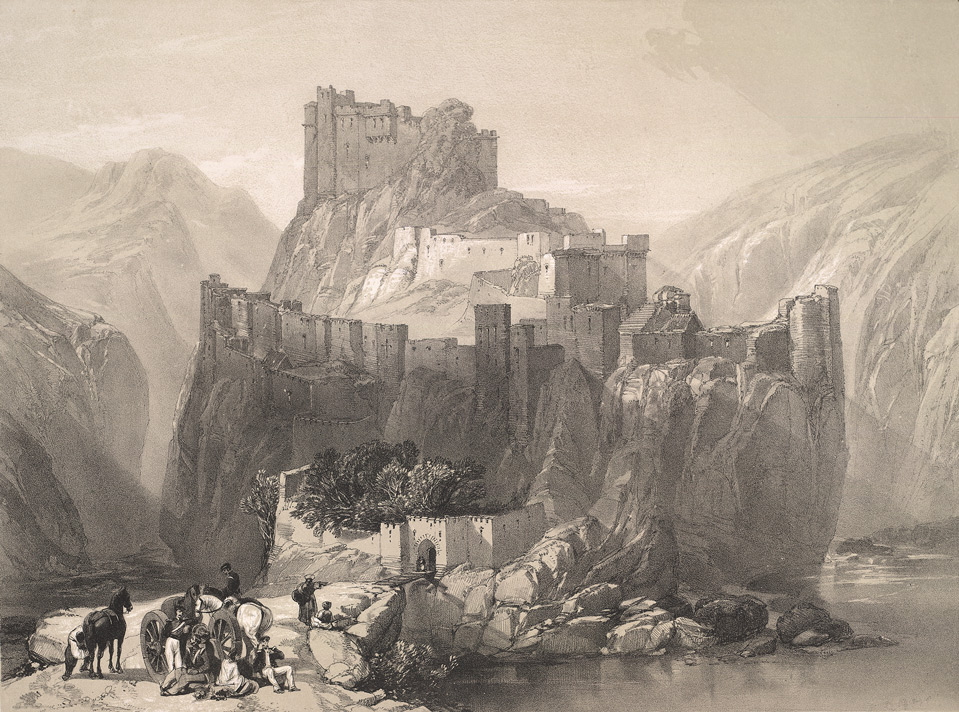
View of Kangra Fort, 1847

Jack was present with his battalion at the Battle of Aliwal (medal), and acted as brigadier of the force sent against the town and fort of Kangra in the Punjab, when he received great credit for his extraordinary exertions in bringing up his 18-pounder guns, which he had been recommended to leave behind. The march was said 'to reflect everlasting credit on the Bengal artillery'. Some views of the place taken by Jack were published under the title Six Sketches of Kot-Kangra, drawn on the spot (London, 1847, fol.).

=== Second Sikh War ===
Jack was in command of his regiment in the Second Sikh War, including the battles of Chillianwalla and Goojerat (medal and clasps and C.B.). He was promoted to lieutenant-colonel in the 34th Bengal Native infantry on 18 December 1851. He became colonel on 20 June 1854, and on 18 July 1856 was appointed brigadier at Cawnpore, the headquarters of Sir Hugh Wheeler's division of the Bengal Army.

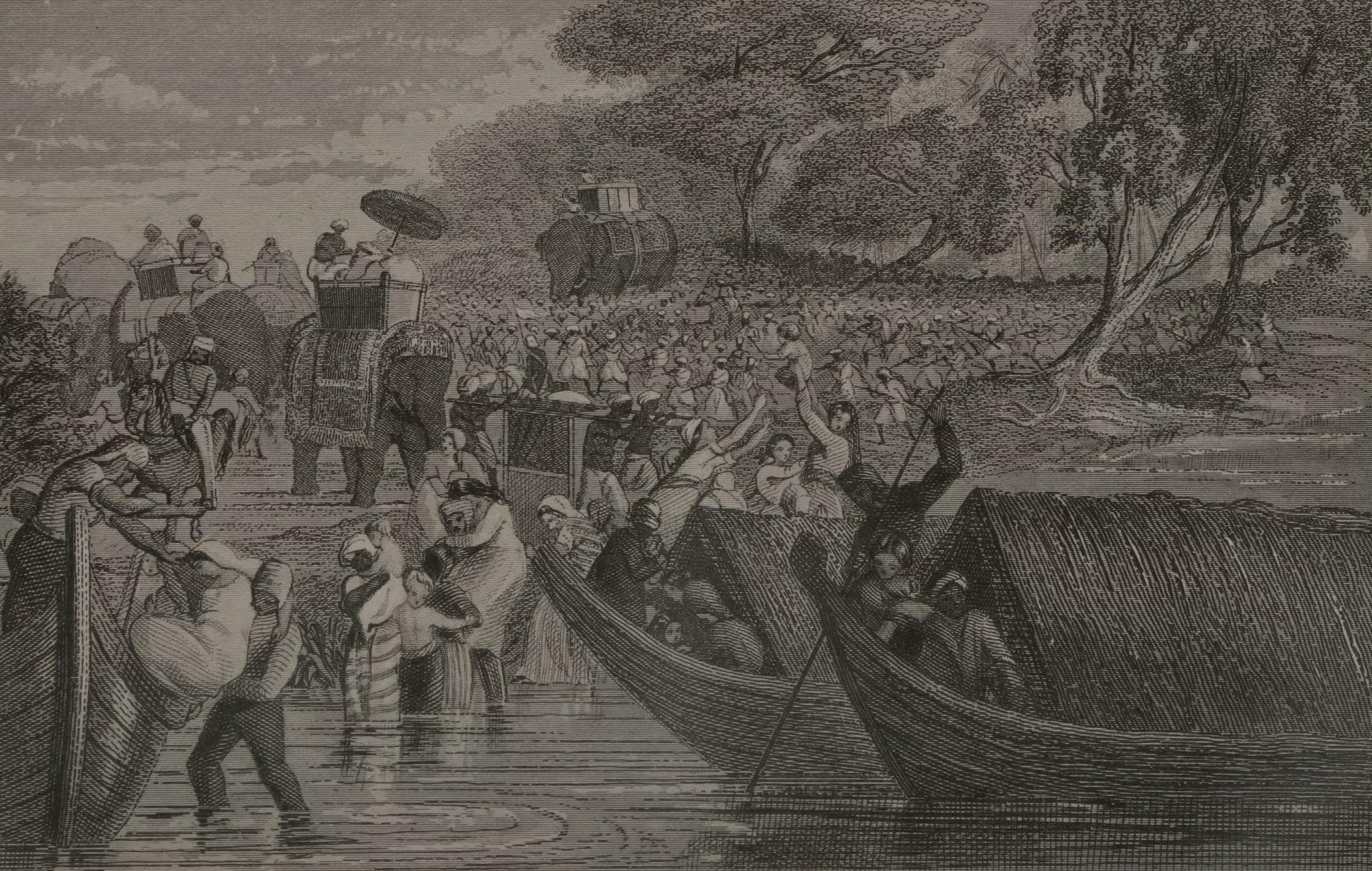
Going on board the boats at Cawnpore, 27 June 1857

=== Indian Mutiny ===
On 7 June 1857 the mutiny broke out at Cawnpore. Wheeler maintained his position in an entrenched camp until 27 June, when an attempted evacuation was made in accordance with an arrangement entered into with Nana Sahib. After the troops had embarked in boats for Allahabad, the mutineers treacherously shot down Jack and all the Englishmen except four. During the previous defence of the lines a brother, Andrew William Thomas Jack, who was on a visit from Australia, had his leg shattered, and succumbed under amputation.

== Honours ==
- Companion of the Order of the Bath
- Sutlej Medal, with clasp for Aliwal
- Punjab Medal, with clasps for Chillianwalla and Goojerat

== Six Views of Kot-Kangra ==
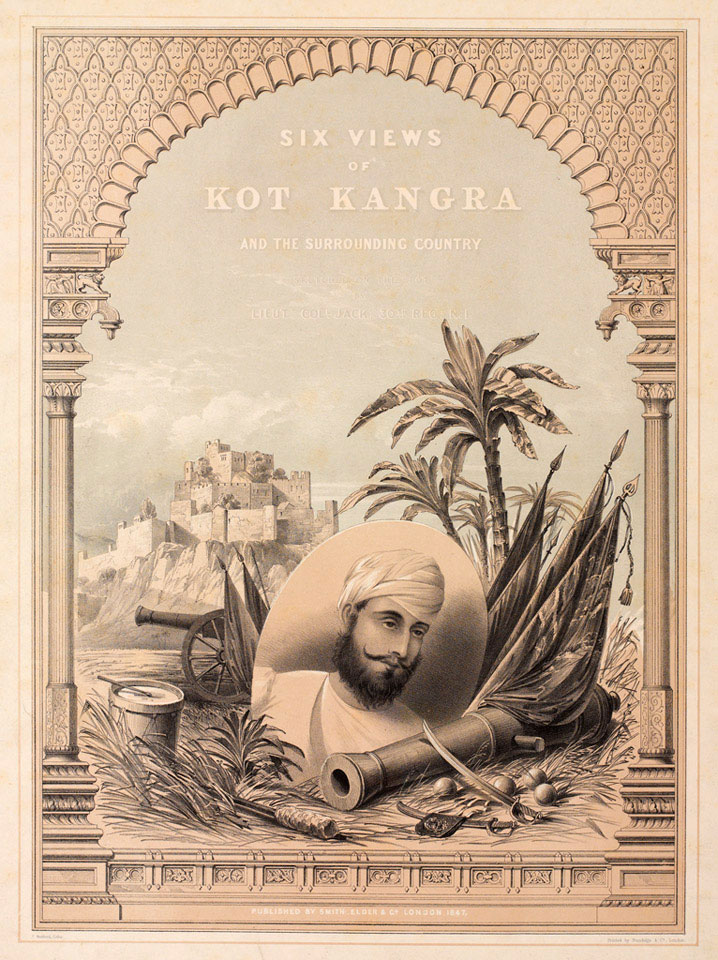
Title page

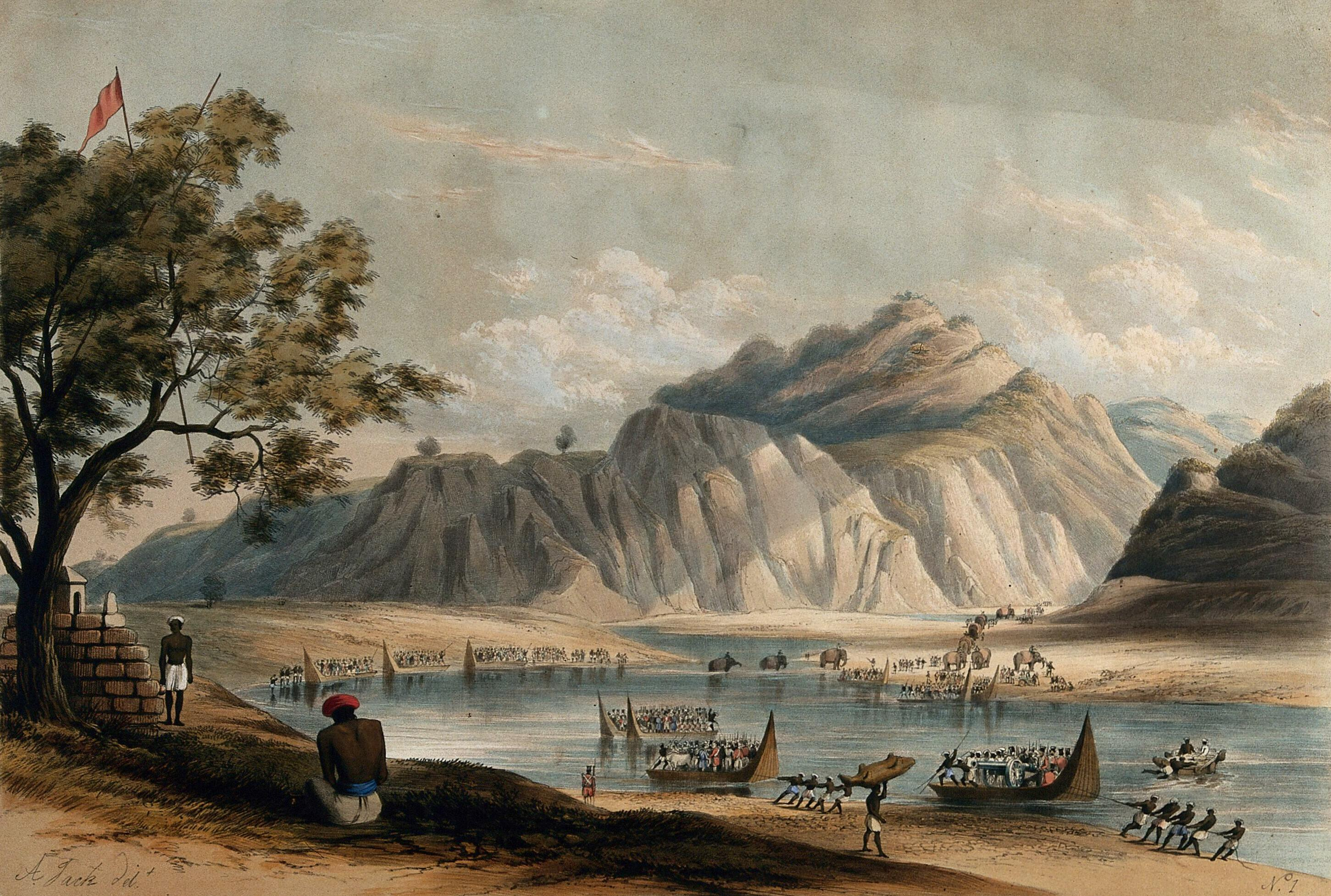
Crossing the River Beas

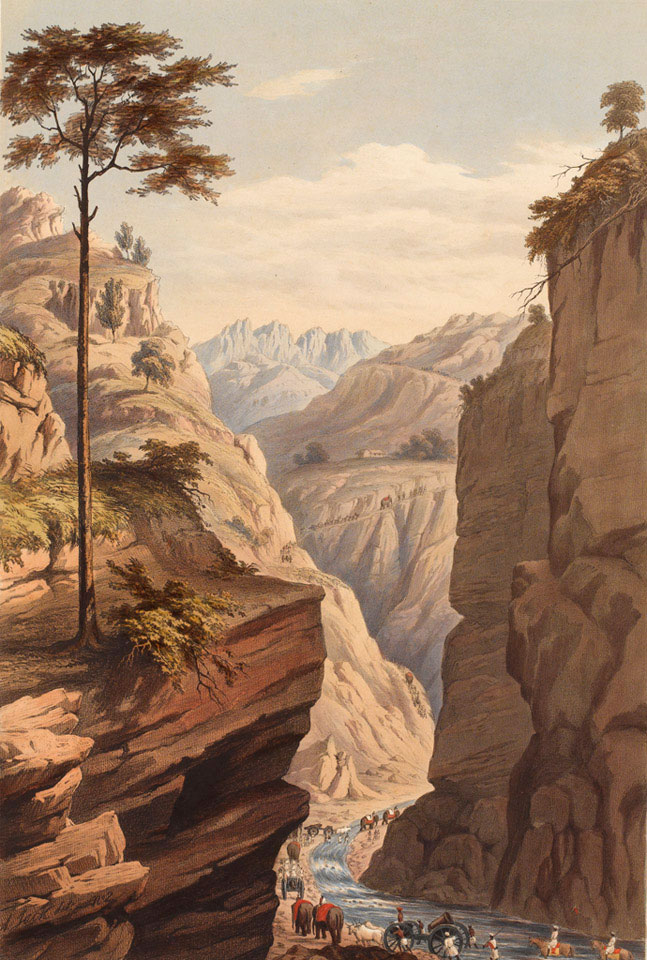
Crossing the River Guj

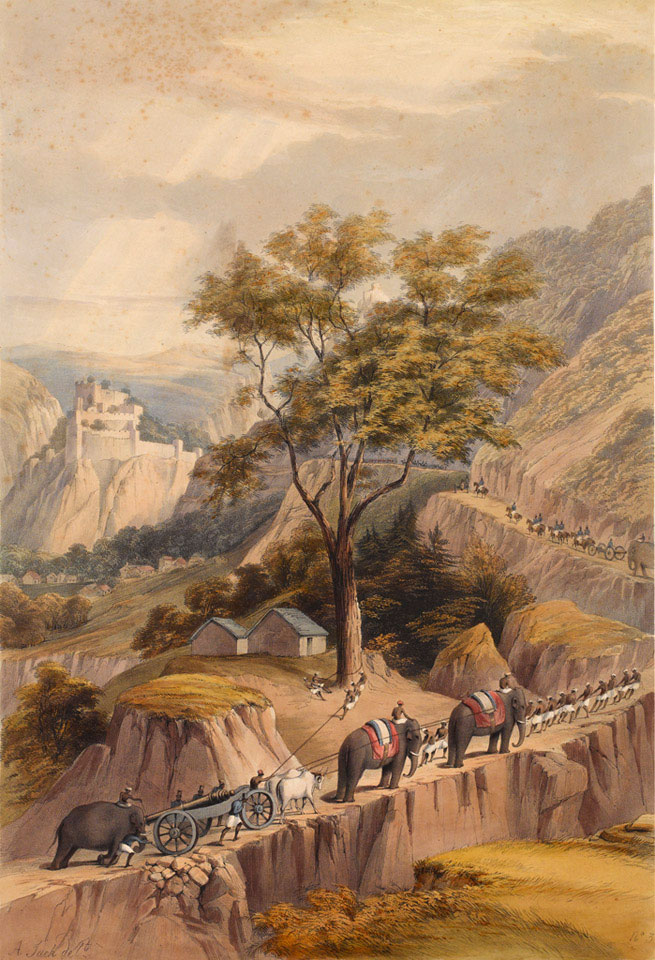
Part of the road by which guns were taken up above the town of Mulkera

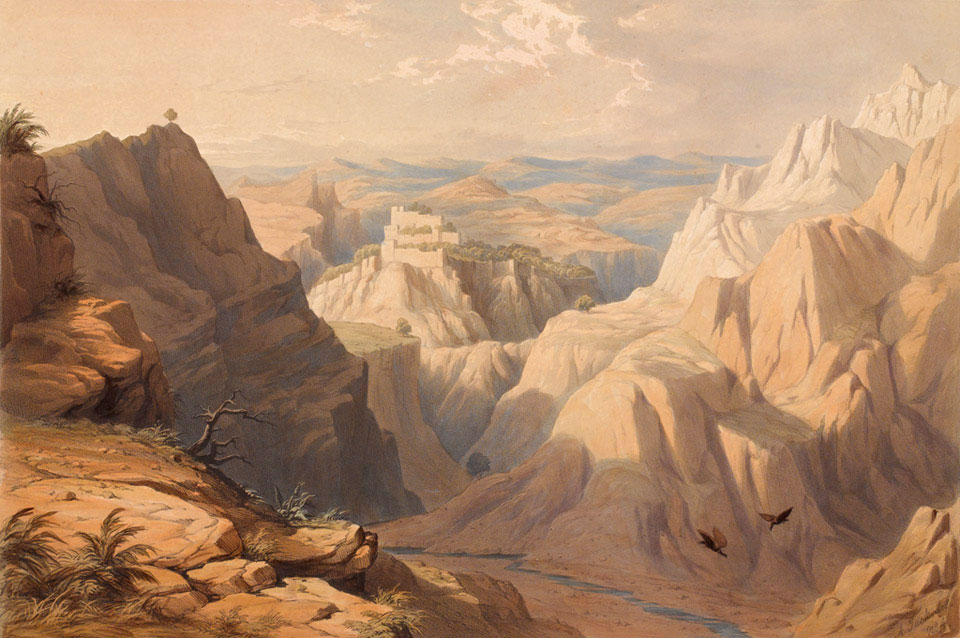
View of the mountains round Kot Kangra

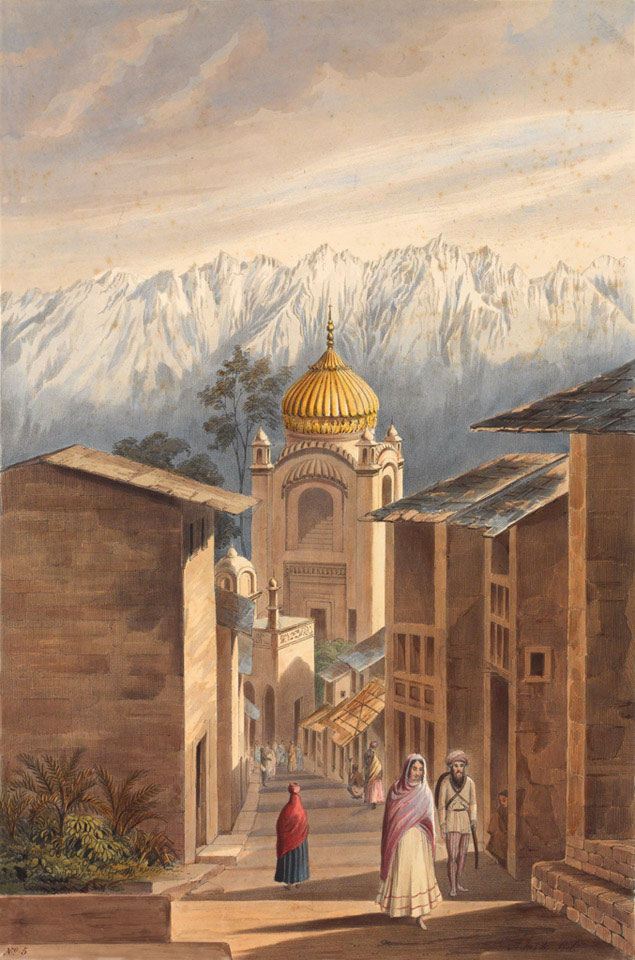
Gilt temple in the town of Mulkera

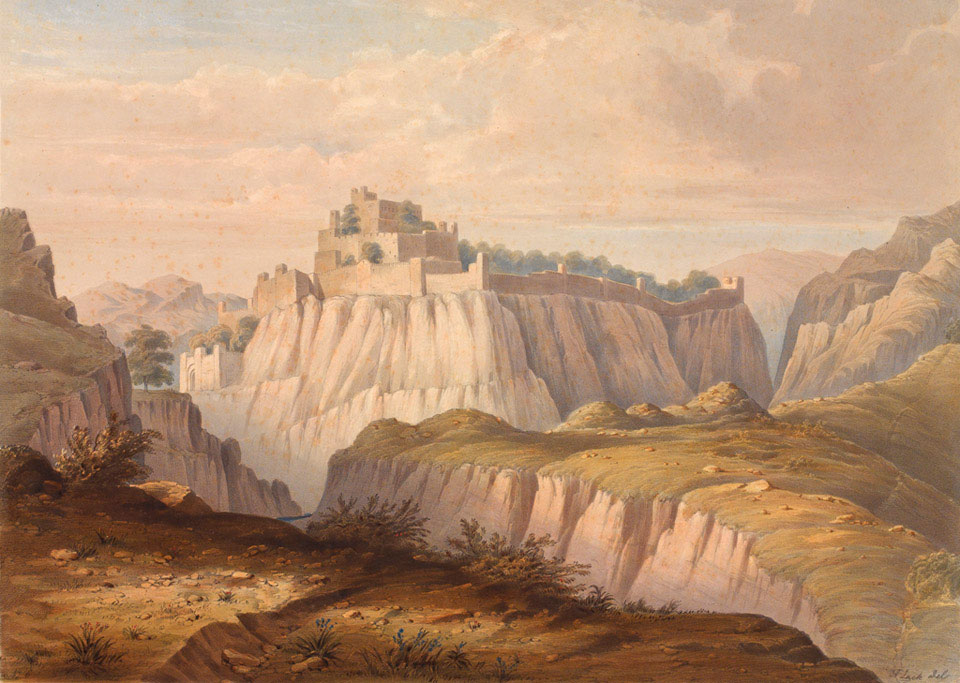
Fortress of Kot Kangra

== Sources ==
- Buckle, E. (1852). Memoir of the Services of the Bengal Artillery from the Formation of the Corps to the Present Time. Kaye, J. W. (ed.). London: Wm. H. Allen. p. 520.
- Chichester, H. M.; May, Alex (2010). "Jack, Alexander (1805–1857), army officer in the East India Company". Oxford Dictionary of National Biography (online ed.). Oxford University Press. doi:10.1093/ref:odnb/14511. (Subscription, Wikipedia Library access or UK public library membership required.)
- Jack, Alexander (1847). Six Views of Kot Kangra and the Surrounding Country. Sketches on the Spot. London: Smith, Elder & Co. [6 plates].

Attribution:

- This article incorporates text from a publication now in the public domain: Chichester, Henry Manners (1892). "Jack, Alexander". In Lee, Sidney (ed.). Dictionary of National Biography. Vol. 29. London: Smith, Elder & Co. p. 85.
