= King's College Chapel, Aberdeen =

Church in Scotland

King's College Chapel
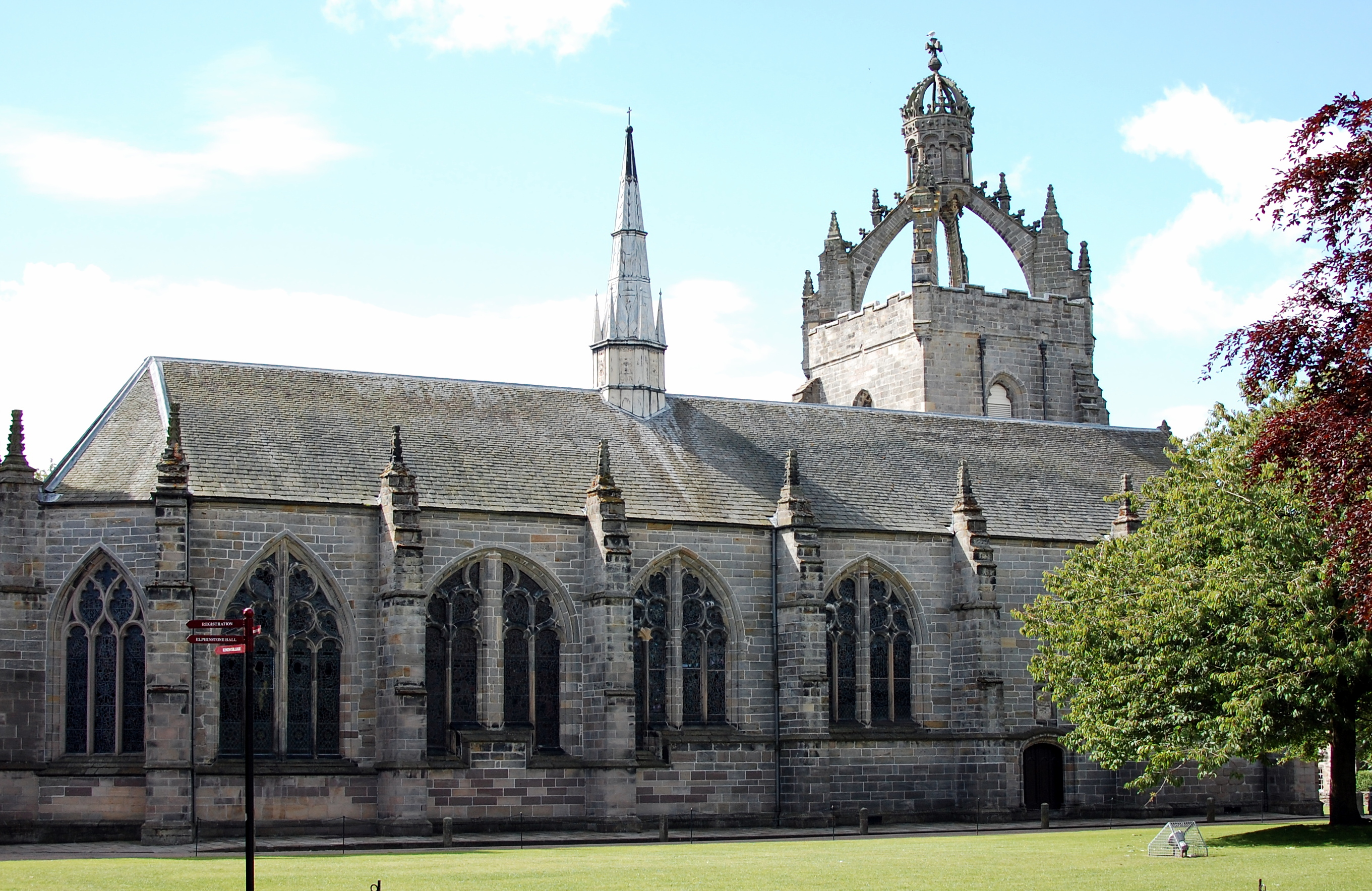
- King's College Chapel
- 57.16415°N 2.10126°W
- Location: Aberdeen
- Country: Scotland
- Denomination: Church of Scotland
- Previous denomination: Roman Catholic

History
- Status: Collegiate chapel
- Dedication: The Trinity and the Blessed Virgin Mary in her Nativity
- Consecrated: 1509

Architecture
- Functional status: Active
- Architectural type: Church
- Years built: 1495-1509

Listed Building – Category A
- Official name: Kings College Chapel, College Bounds
- Designated: 12 January 1967
- Reference no.: LB19943

King's College Chapel is the chapel of King's College in the University of Aberdeen. The chapel's Crown Tower is considered one of the most recognisable symbols of both the university and Aberdeen.

== History ==
=== Construction ===
According to an inscription on the west front, construction was started on the 2nd April, 1500, however the preparations for its construction began in 1498, slowed due to the land being marshy. The architect might have been Alexander Gray or John Grey. It was consecrated in 1509, and dedicated to the Trinity and the Blessed Virgin Mary in her Nativity. It was built from golden Moray sandstone, which was shipped to Aberdeen at great expense. The Hector Boece, principal of the university, wrote in 1522 that the steeple was of great height, and surrounded by stonework arched in form of an imperial crown (referring to the crown tower). Boece himself was buried at the foot of the chancel. Adjoined to the south side of the chapel, Bishop William Stewart (bishop from 1532 to 1545) built a two storey building, housing a library, jewel house, vestry, and classrooms.

=== Reformation ===
During the Reformation, the stained glass windows were destroyed, but they were later replaced. The Catholic teaching staff were purged in 1569, and the six choir boys were also dismissed. On 7 February 1633, a storm blew down the original crown from the tower, which was subsequently replaced the following year, the replacement was described as "little inferior to the last", although of a distinctly Renaissance style. The college library (which was housed in the nave of the chapel) burnt down around 1772, alongside Bishop Stewart's building, however the university's books were saved.

=== Twentieth Century ===
In 1921, following World War I, the Senatus Academicus decided to reconstruct the Antechapel to include a war memorial for the 342 that had died during the war, from all four nations of the university, without rank or title. On Remembrance Sunday 1952, it was unveiled again in an extended form and rededicated by Rev. Dr William Neil.

In the year 2000, to mark the chapel's 500 year anniversary, the university organised a traditional Latin Mass, only the second time since the Reformation that a Catholic mass had been held at the chapel.

== Features ==
The chapel features whitewashed walls, and a wooden canopy, stalls, and screen (which divides the chapel interior), which are considered some of the finest surviving examples of early 16th century woodwork in Scotland. The pulpit was originally constructed for St Machar's Cathedral in 1530. On the exterior, it features massive buttresses with numerous intakes, at each bay, and also on the crown tower. The east end of the chapel is three-sided.

The main organ currently in the chapel was built by Bernard Aubertin in 2004.

=== Crown Tower ===
The crown atop the Crown Tower is formed by an arrangement of four flying buttresses thrown inwards from each corner, with the tower at the pinnacle holding the crown itself. It has been considered one of the most recognisable symbols of both the university and Aberdeen. It is one of two surviving mediaeval crown steeples in Scotland, with the other being at St Giles Cathedral, Edinburgh.

== Gallery ==
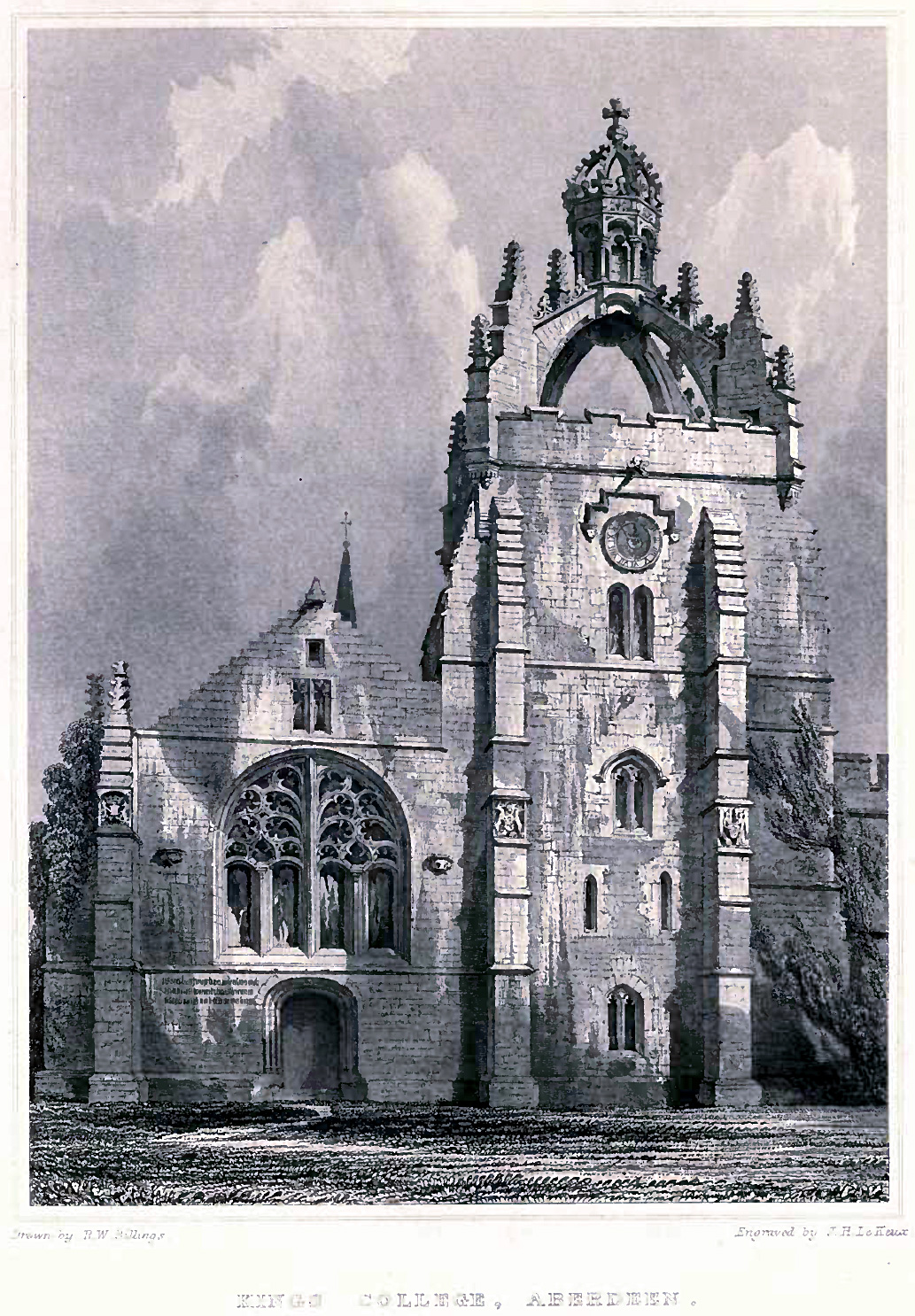

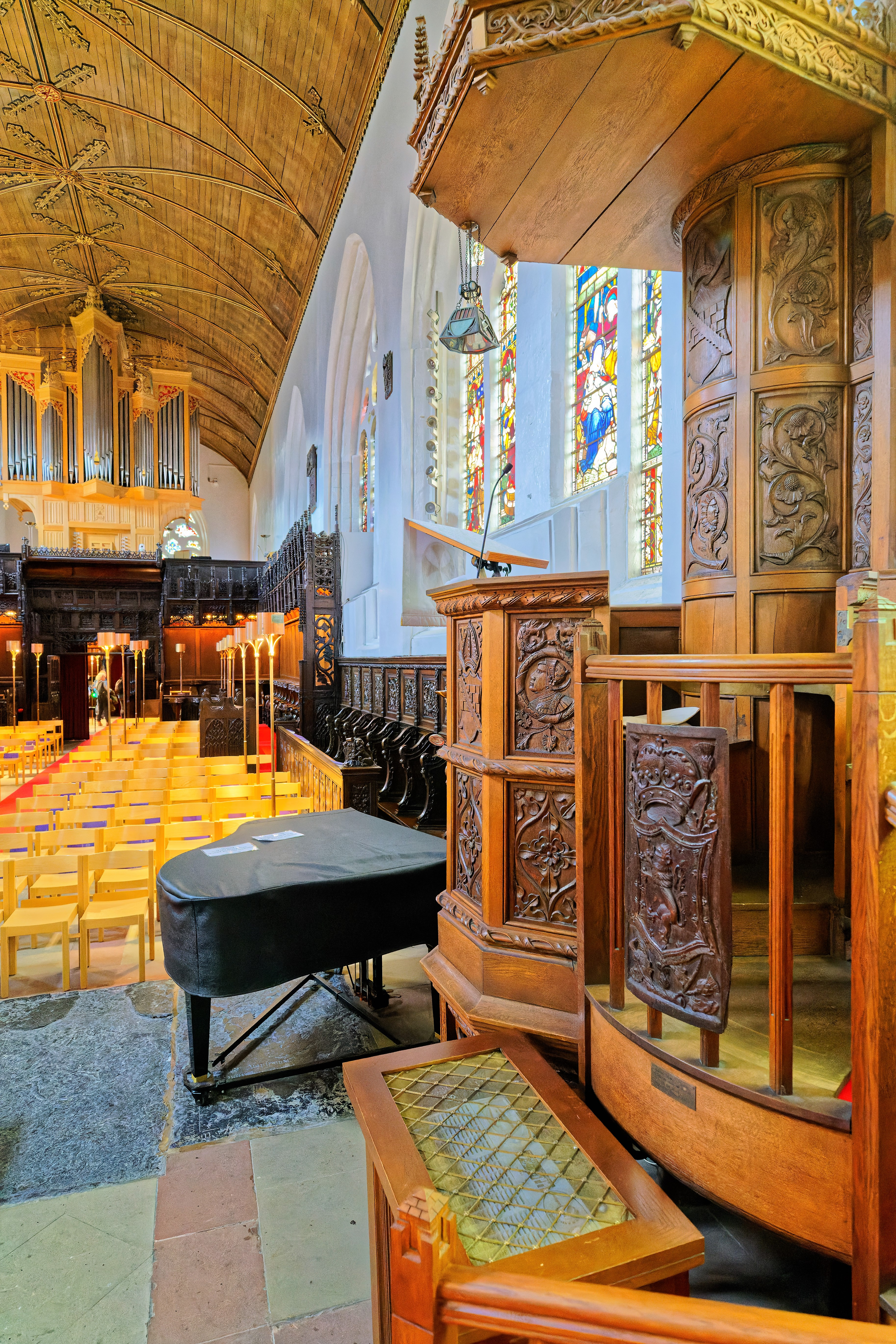

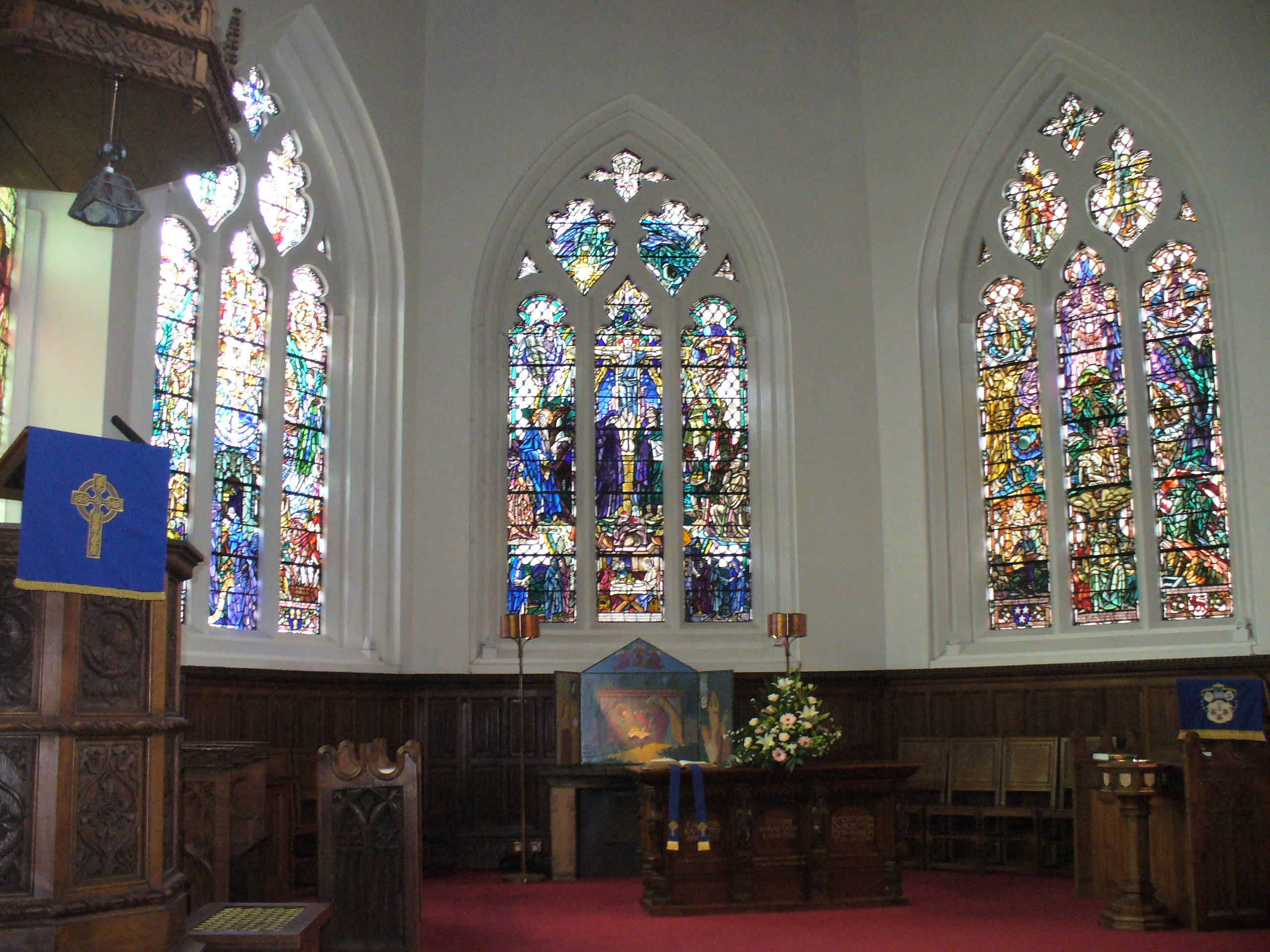

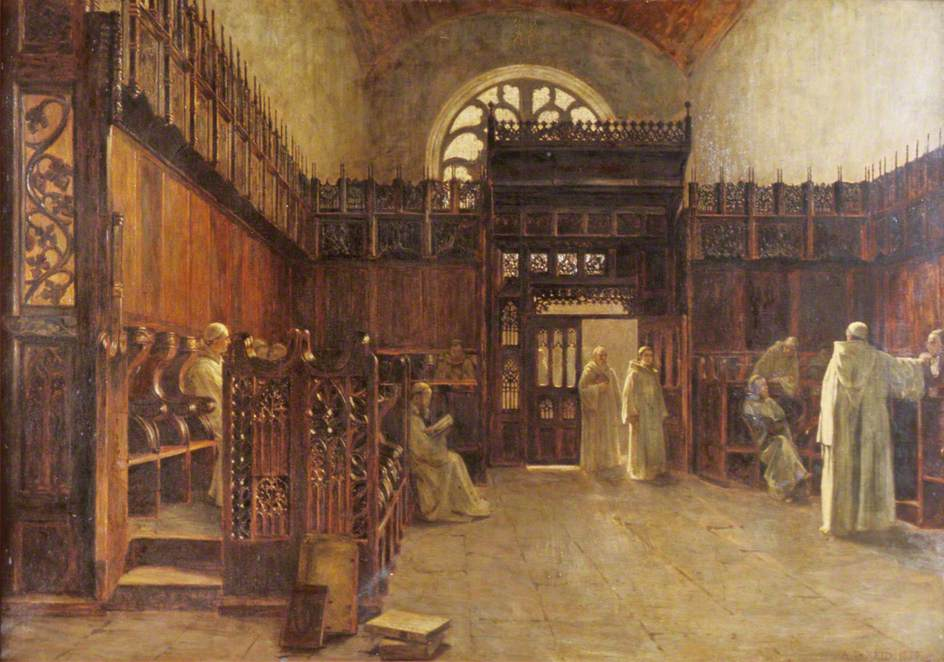

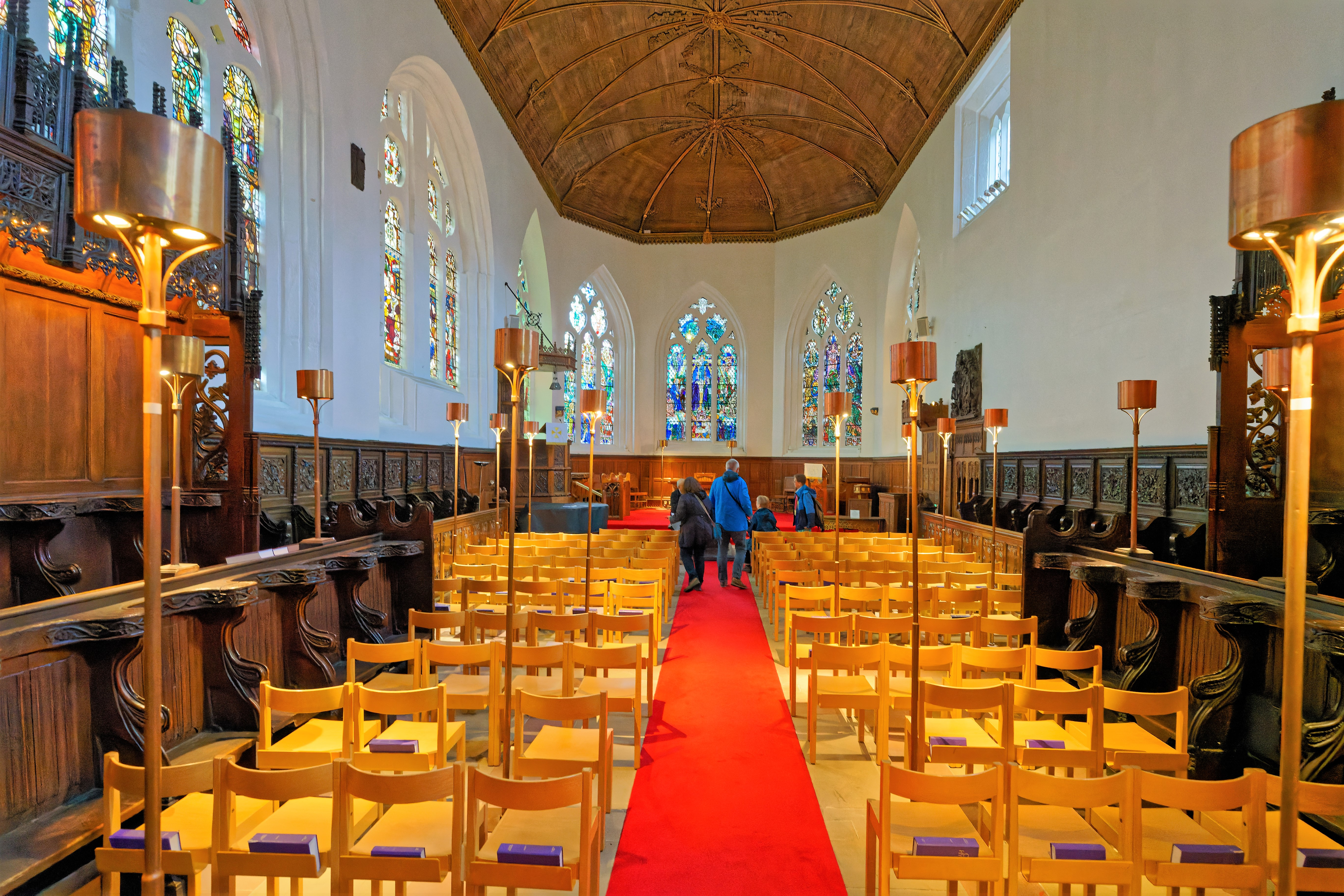

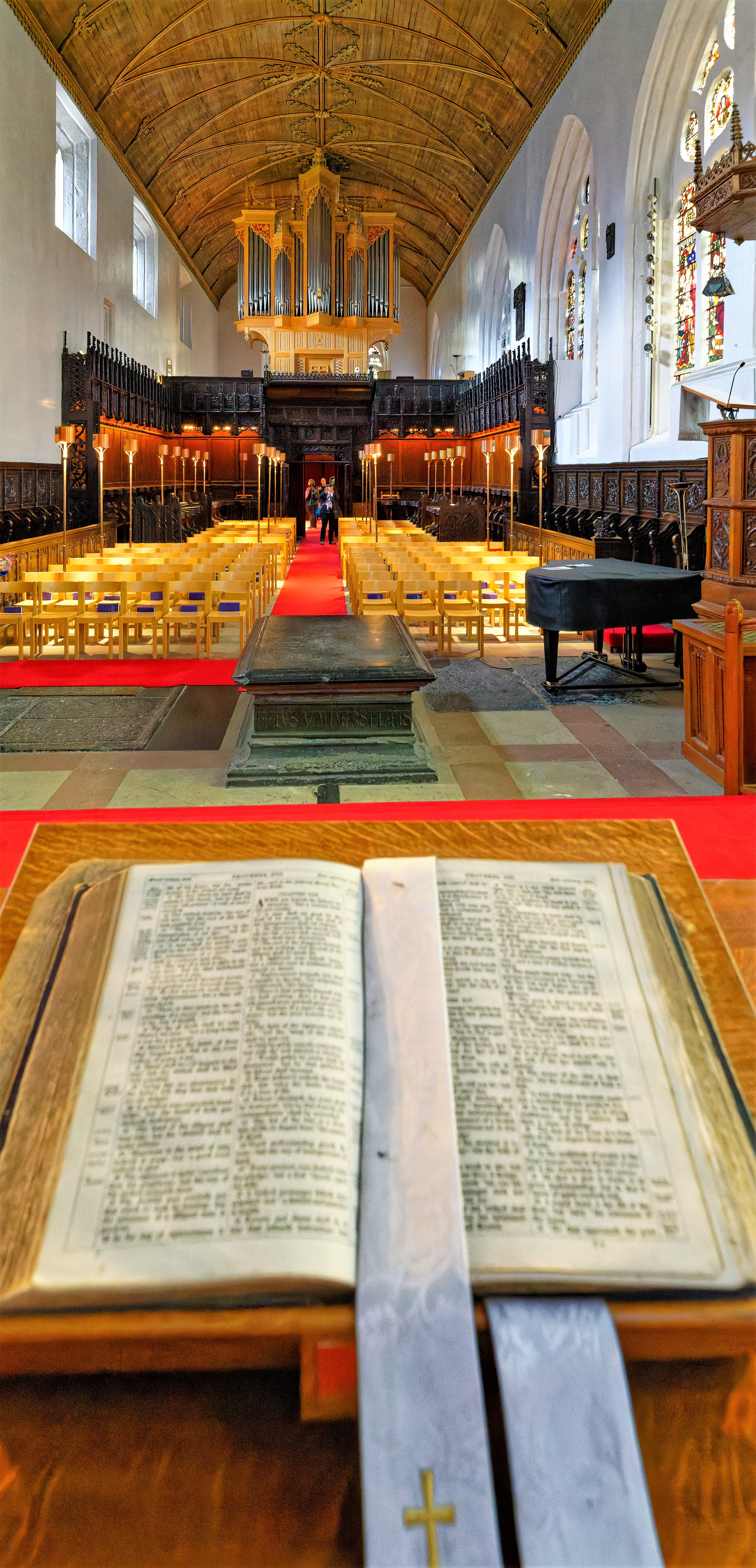

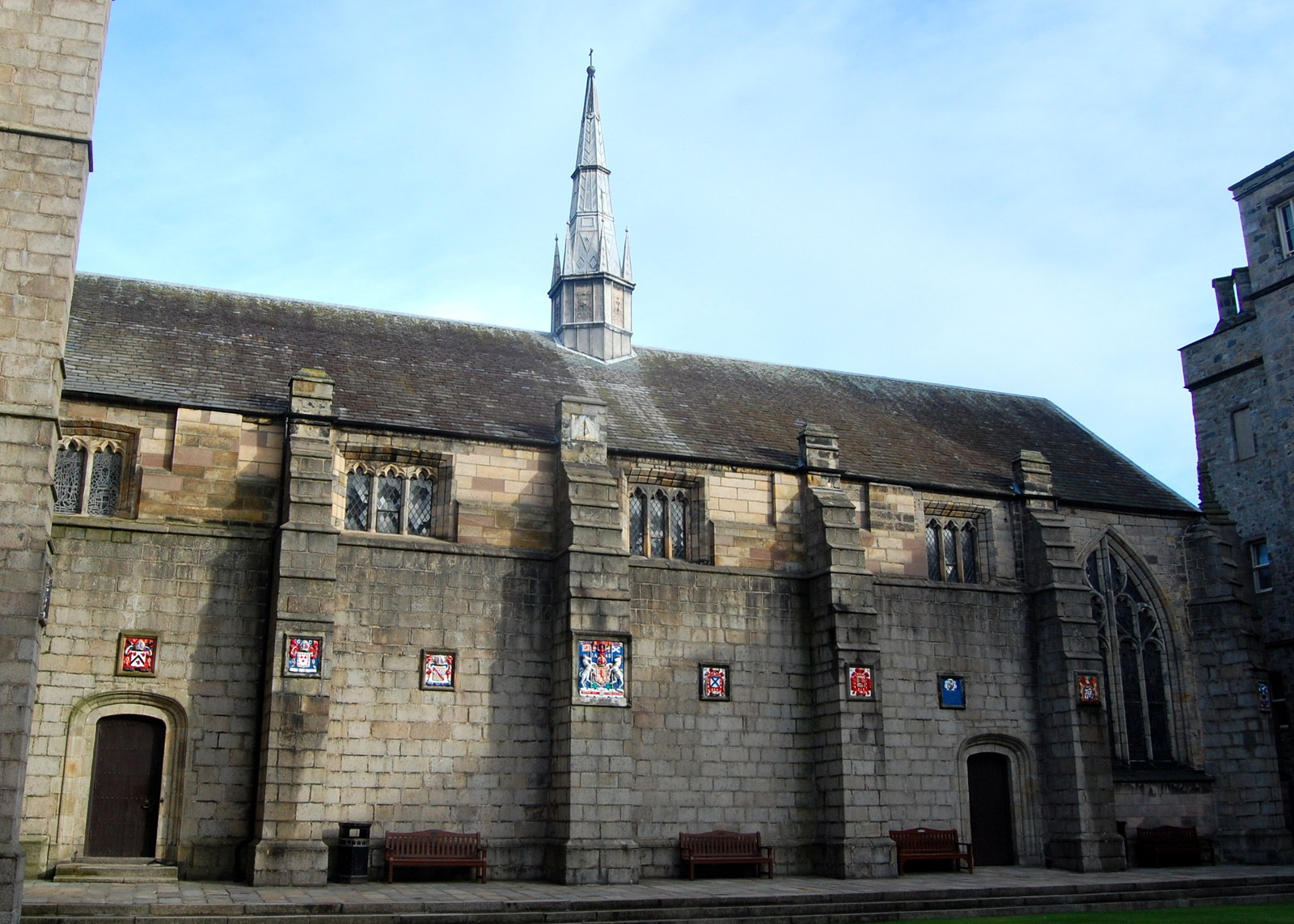
