= William Jack (botanist) =

Scottish botanist and medical practitioner

- Born: 1795; Aberdeen, Scotland
- Died: 15 September 1822 (aged 27-28); Bencoolen, Sumatra
- Scientific career
- Fields: medicine, botany

William Jack FRSE (1795 in Aberdeen – 1822 in Bencoolen, Sumatra) was a Scottish botanist and medical practitioner.

== Life ==
He was born in Aberdeen on 29 January 1795 the son of Rev Prof William Jack and his wife Grace Bolt (d.1850). His father was a regent (the equivalent of Fellow) at King's College, Aberdeen at the time of Jack's birth, and went on to be first Sub-Principal and then Principal of the College.

Jack studied at King's College, Aberdeen (which later became the University of Aberdeen) and received an M.A. degree at the age of 16, then continued studies in medicine in London, graduating as an M.D., and was admitted to the Royal College of Surgeons of England in 1812.

Jack was employed by the East India Company as a surgeon in India, where he corresponded extensively with botanist Nathaniel Wallich. In 1818 he accompanied Stamford Raffles to Sumatra where he extensively documented the rich flora of that region until his death in 1822. Much of his work, including manuscripts, drawings, and collections, was destroyed by fire in 1824.

He died at Bencoolen in Sumatra on 15 September 1822.

Two of his younger brothers (also in the East India Company) were killed in the Cawnpore Massacre in 1857.

== Botanical references ==
Three plant genera are named after him:

- Jakkia Blume, 1823, a synonym of Xanthophyllum, in family Polygalaceae
- Jackia Wall., 1824, a synonym of Jackiopsis Ridsdale, in family Rubiaceae
- Jackia Spreng., nom. illeg., 1826, a synonym of Eriolaena in family Malvaceae

== Published works ==
- Descriptions of Malayan Plants 1820–1822. Originally published in Malayan Miscellanies, and reprinted in various forms at later dates.
- William Jack, communicated by Robert Brown (1823) On the Malayan Species of Melastoma, Transactions of The Linnean Society of London 14(1): 1-22
- William Jack, communicated by Aylmer Bourke Lambert (1823) On Cyrtandraceae, a new Natural Order of Plants, Transactions of The Linnean Society of London 14(1): 23-45
- William Jack, communicated by Henry Thomas Colebrooke (1823) Account of the Lansium and some other Genera of Malayan Plants, Transactions of The Linnean Society of London 14(1): 114-130

=== Other published works ===
From Malayan Miscellanies : vol.I, 1820 (as credited by Dr N Wallich):-

- Notes on Bali.
- Annals of Achin translated from the original MS.
- Short account of the Battas.
- Annotations & remarks with a view to illustrate the probable origins of the Dayaks, the Malays &c.
- Short account of the islands of Timor, Rotti, Savu, Solor &c..
- Proceedings of the Native School Institution.
- Meteorological Table, extracted from the Register kept at Bencoolen during theyears 1818 & 1819.
- Poem in the Malay language descriptive of the journey of the Lieut. Governor to Menangcabow in 1818.

From Malayan Miscellanies : vol.II, 1822:-

- Memorandum of a Journey to the summit of Gunong Benko or the Sugar loaf mountain in the interior of Bencoolen.
- Short Notice concerning the island of Pulo Nias, with comparative Vocabularies in the languages of Nias, Batta, Bima & Lampung, and in 3 Dialects of the Dayaks in Borneo.
- Genealogical account of the family of the present Rajahs of Goa in Celebes.
- Abstract of the Genealogy of the Rajahs of Pulo Percha (Sumatra); from a MS in the possession of the Sultan of Indrapura.
- Translation of the Undang Undang of Moco Moco.
- The Undang Undang of Moco Moco in the native dialect & character.
