= Science Teaching Hub =

Building of the University of Aberdeen, Scotland

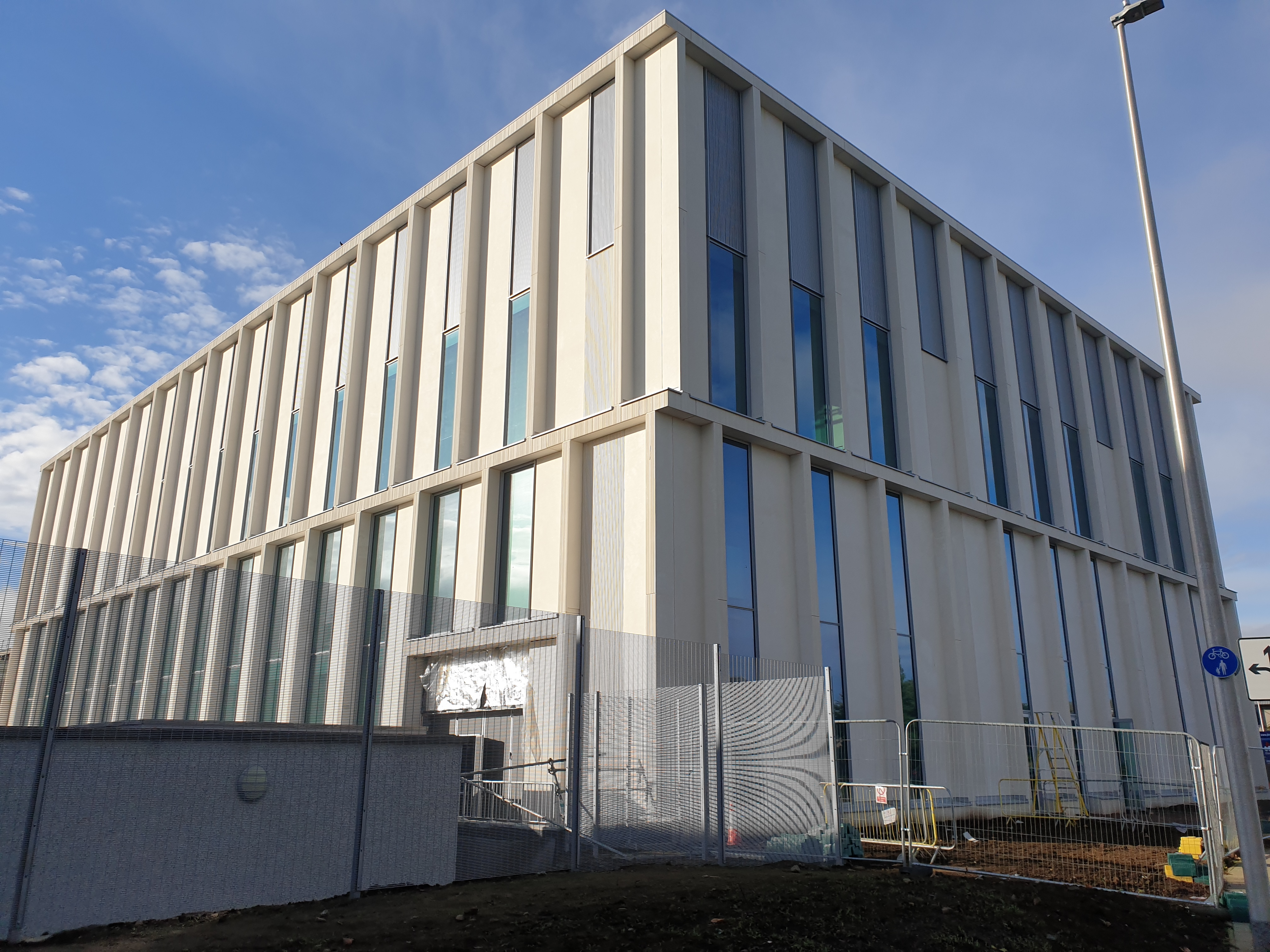
- Interactive map of the Science Teaching Hub area

General information
- Status: Open
- Location: Aberdeen, Scotland
- Coordinates: 57°9′59.74″N 2°6′18.88″W
- Construction started: May 2019
- Completed: 2021
- Opened: 2022
- Cost: £35 million
- Owner: University of Aberdeen

The Science Teaching Hub is a building at the University of Aberdeen.

== History ==
Plans for the building were revealed on 1 September 2017. Pending approval, teaching in the building was slated to begin in 2021 but the opening was delayed for a year due to the Covid pandemic.

Planning permission was granted in August 2018. Construction began in May 2019, two months later than expected. The building was completed in late 2021.

== Location ==
The building is situated within the university's Old Aberdeen campus on a site adjacent to the Sir Duncan Rice Library and the Fraser Noble Building.

== Design ==
The building was designed by Reiach and Hall Architects and is being built at a cost of £35 million. The building will contain laboratories for students studying various subjects.
