= Roderick MacLeod (minister) =

Scottish minister (1754–1801)

Roderick MacLeod FRSE
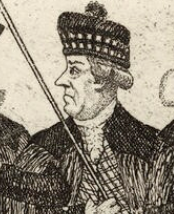
- Caricature from 'The Sapient Septemviri'
- Born: 1727
- Died: 11 September 1815 (aged 87–88)
- Spouse: Isabella Christie (m. 1780)
- Children: 10 (6 survived to adulthood)

Academic work
- Discipline: Philosophy
- Institutions: King's College, Aberdeen

Roderick MacLeod FRSE (1727–11 September 1815) was Principal of Kings College, Aberdeen 1800 to 1815.

== Life ==
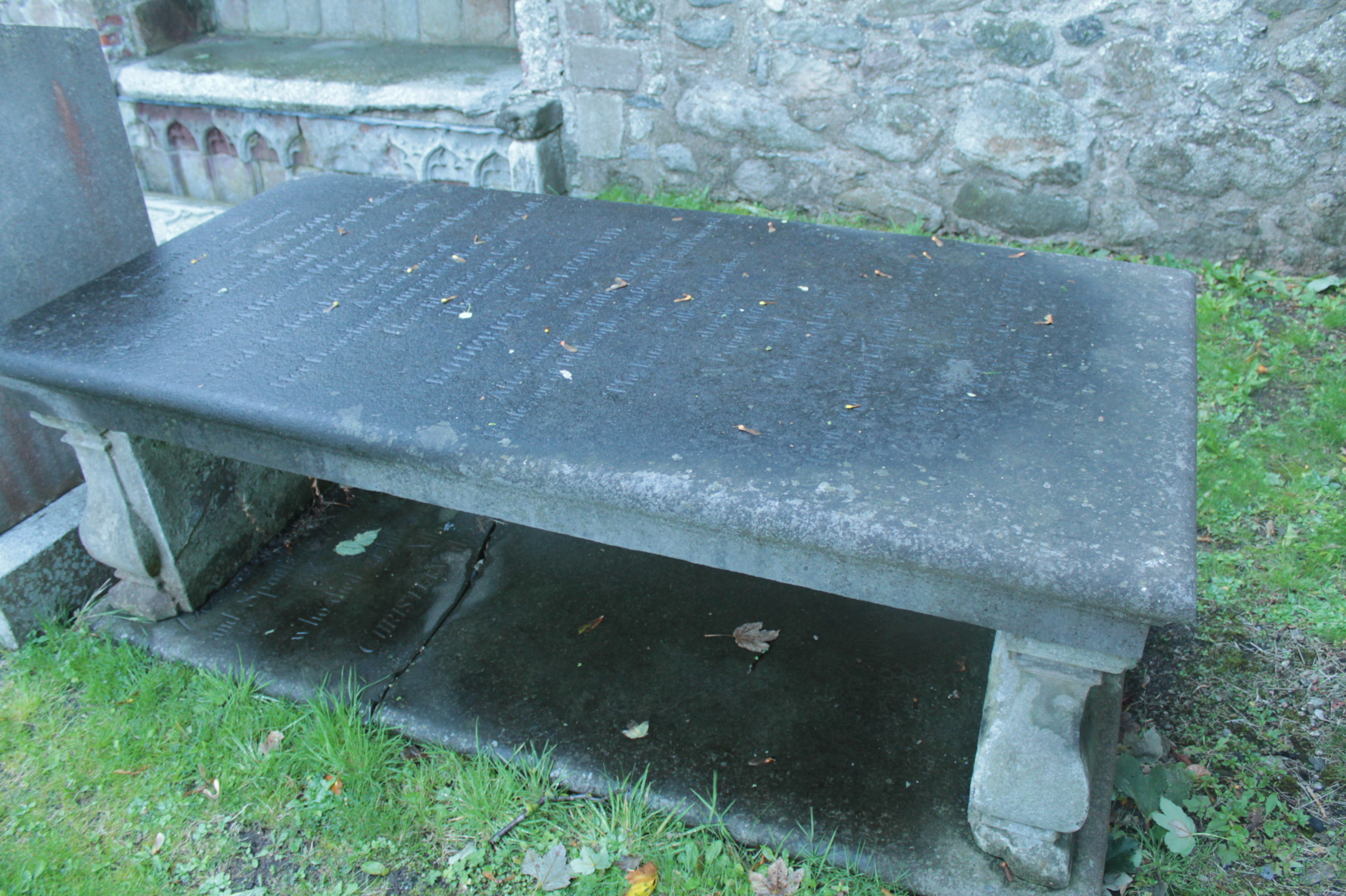
The grave of Rev Prof Roderick MacLeod, St Machar's Cathedral, Aberdeen

MacLeod was born in 1727, the third son of Christina and Donald MacLeod, Laird of Talisker, Skye. Roderick had three siblings. He studied at Aberdeen University, graduating MA in 1746.

From 1749 he was Professor of Philosophy of King's College, Aberdeen. In 1764 he was elected Sub Principal, and, after 36 years in this role, in 1800 was elected Principal in place of John Chalmers, holding this role until death.

In 1783 he was elected a Fellow of the Royal Society of Edinburgh the day it was founded. Aberdeen University gave him an honorary doctorate (DD) in 1793.

He died on 11 September 1815. He is buried in the enclosed area to the east of St Machar's Cathedral in Old Aberdeen.

== Family ==
In June 1780 he married Isobel or Isabella Christie (1760–1832), daughter of Dr. Christie of Baberton.

They had ten children, six of whom survived to adulthood. Most notable were Christian MacLeod, who married Hugh Macpherson, Professor of Greek at King's College, Aberdeen, and Isabelle MacLeod, who married Arthur Forbes, son of Sir Arthur Forbes of Craigievar. Dr. Roderick MacLeod (1785–1852) died in London.

Roderick's wife remarried after his death.

== Artistic recognition ==
His portrait is owned by the Scottish National Portrait Gallery, held in storage for preservation, rarely on display.
