= King's College, Aberdeen =

College of University of Aberdeen

Coordinates: 57.1639°N 2.1012°W

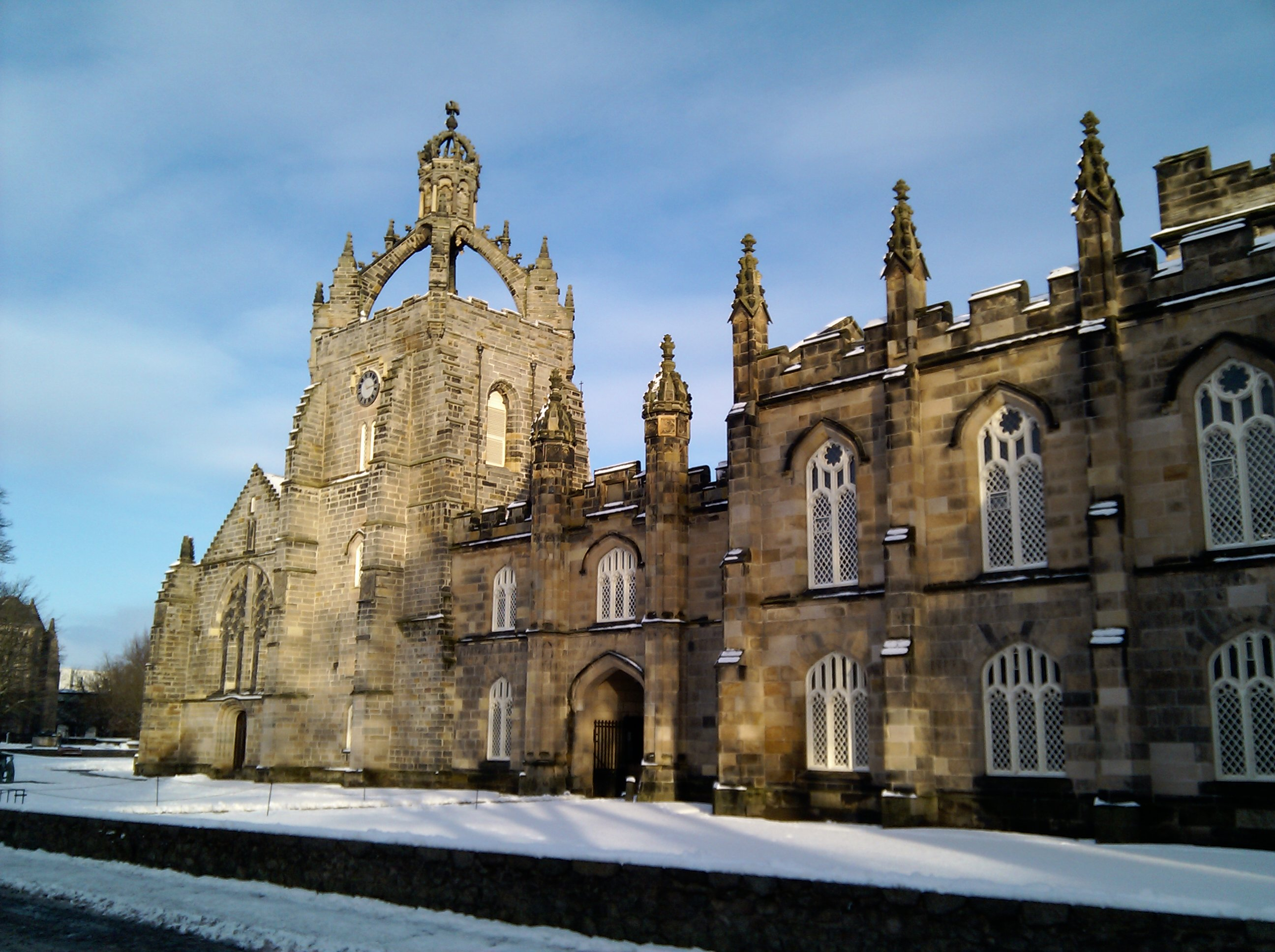
King's College

King's College in Old Aberdeen, Scotland, the full title of which is The University and King's College of Aberdeen (Collegium Regium Aberdonense), is a formerly independent university founded in 1495 and now an integral part of the University of Aberdeen. Its historic buildings are the centrepiece of the University of Aberdeen's Old Aberdeen campus, often known as the King's or King's College campus.

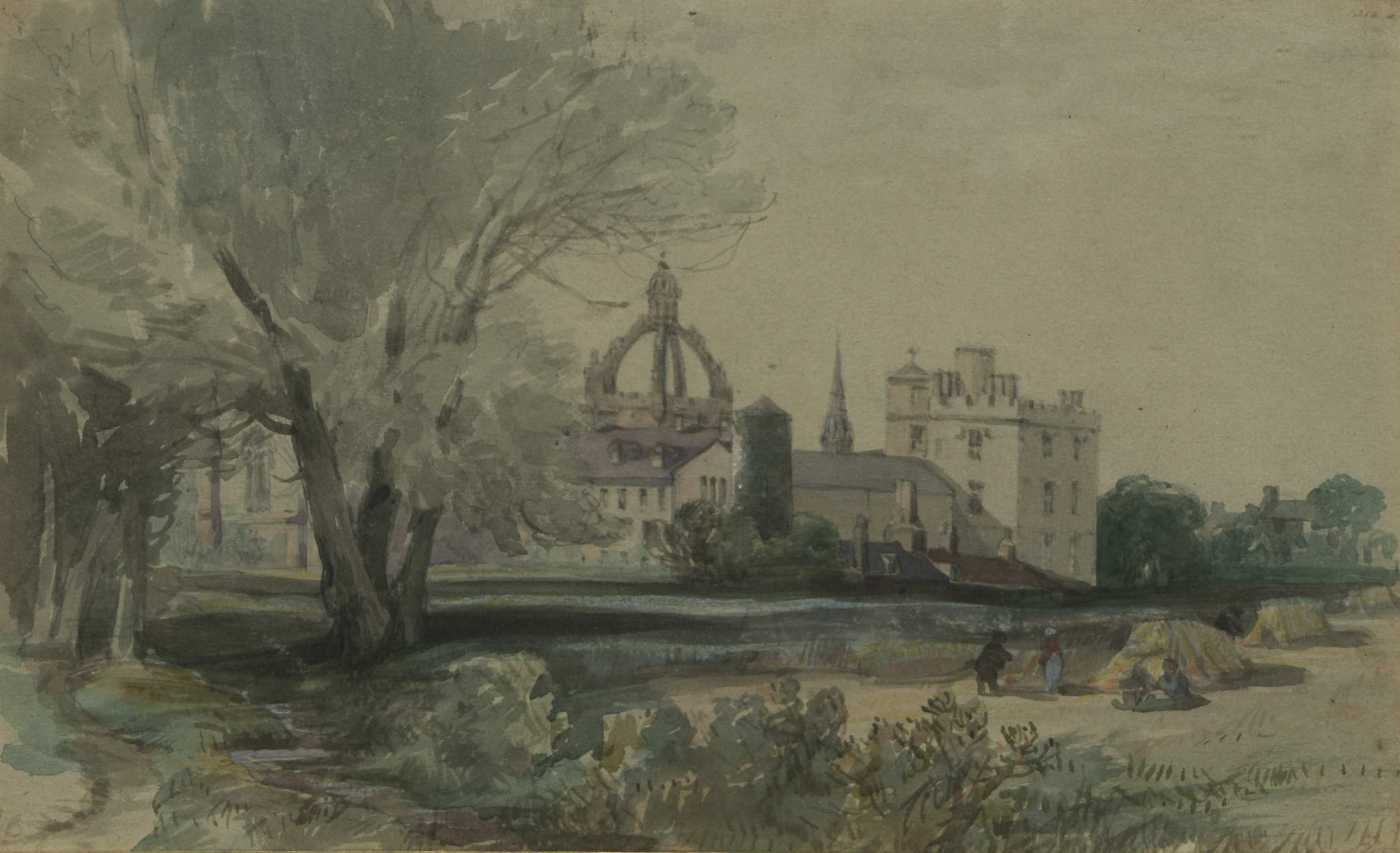
King's College, Old Aberdeen - ABDAG002677

The focal point of the college, as well as its oldest building, is the late 15th century King's College Chapel. A number of other historic buildings remain, with others being subject to renovation and rebuilding in the 18th and 19th centuries. In the early 20th century, a great deal of expansion saw the university buildings increase around the historic college buildings. In the later 20th century, the university expanded dramatically in size, dominating Old Aberdeen and expanding out from the High Street with a number of modern buildings.

== History ==
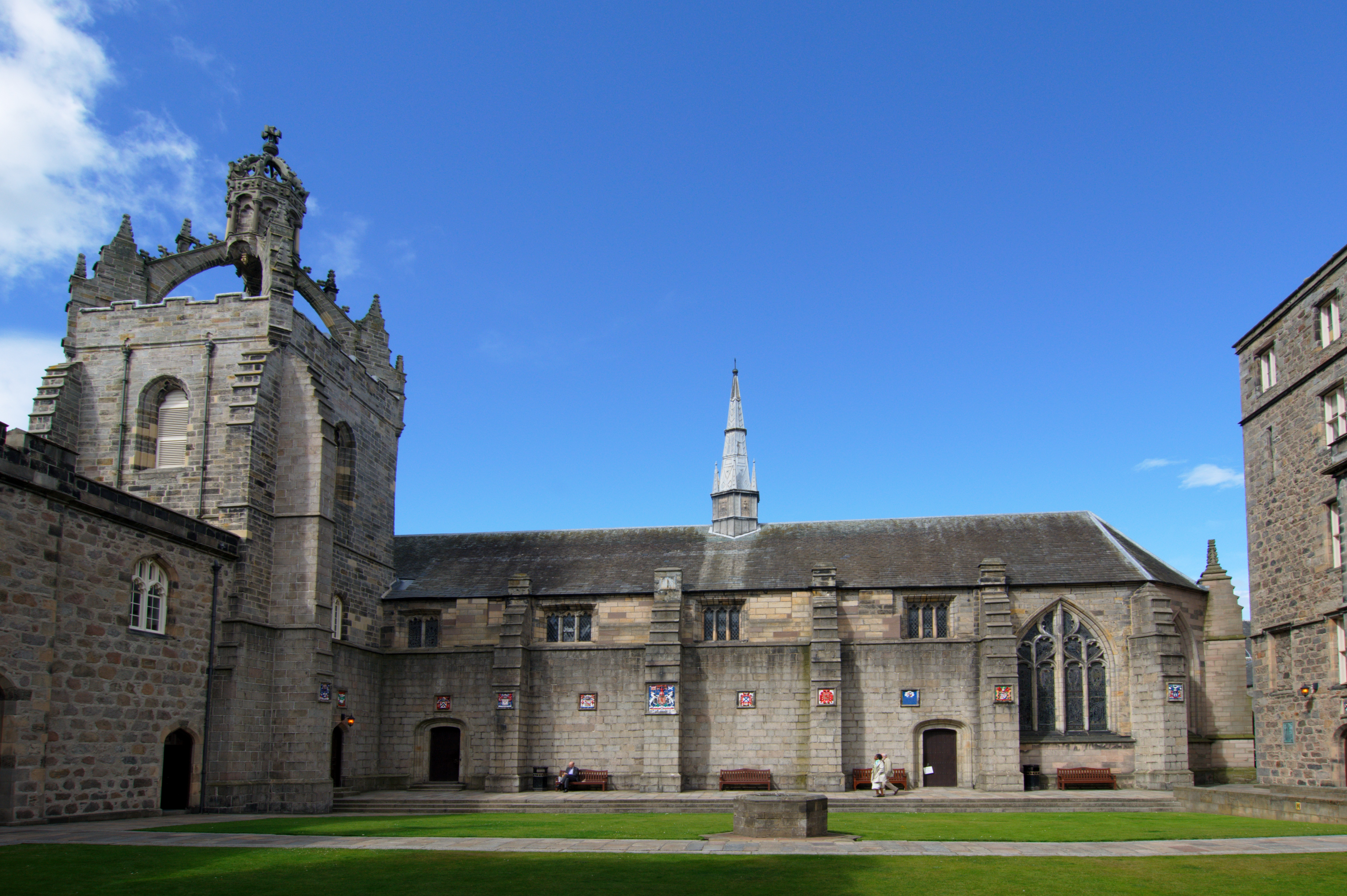
King's College quad

King's College was the first university in Aberdeen, the third in Scotland and the fifth in the British Isles. In 1495, William Elphinstone, the relatively newly appointed Bishop of Aberdeen, petitioned Pope Alexander VI on behalf of King James IV to create the facility to cure the ignorance he had witnessed within his parish and in the north generally. The papal bull Primo Erectio Universitatis was issued by Pope Alexander VI on 19 February 1495 (10 February 1494 O.S.), founding the university; a royal charter later that year recognised Aberdeen's status as equal to that of Scotland's two existing universities at Glasgow and St Andrews. As a former professor at the University of Paris, Elphinstone modelled the university on the continental European tradition. Hector Boece, a fellow professor at Paris, was awarded the status of first principal of the new institution.

It would not be until 1509, with the issuance of a charter by Elphinstone, that university life at King's truly began. Construction of the chapel began in 1498; it was consecrated in 1509 and dedicated to St Mary. By 1514, the university had some forty-two members, counting both staff and students.

Following the Reformation, King's College was purged of its Roman Catholic staff but remained largely resistant to change in its methods. George Keith, the fifth Earl Marischal, however was a moderniser within the college and supportive of the reforming ideas of Peter Ramus. In April 1593 Keith founded a second university in the city, Marischal College. Initially, Marischal offered the principal of King's College a role in selecting its academics, however this was refused by the authorities of King's, a move which was cited as the first blow in their future rivalry.

In common with Marischal, King's College supported the Jacobite cause, and following the defeat of the 1715 rising, both were largely purged of their academics and officials.

=== Principals of Note ===
- Alexander Arbuthnot (poet) 1569 to 1583
- Rev Dr David Rait from 1598 to 1632
- William Leslie one of the Aberdeen Doctors
- William Guild 1640 to 1651
- John Row 1652 to 1661
- Roderick MacLeod 1800 to 1815
- William Jack 1815 to 1854

== College buildings ==
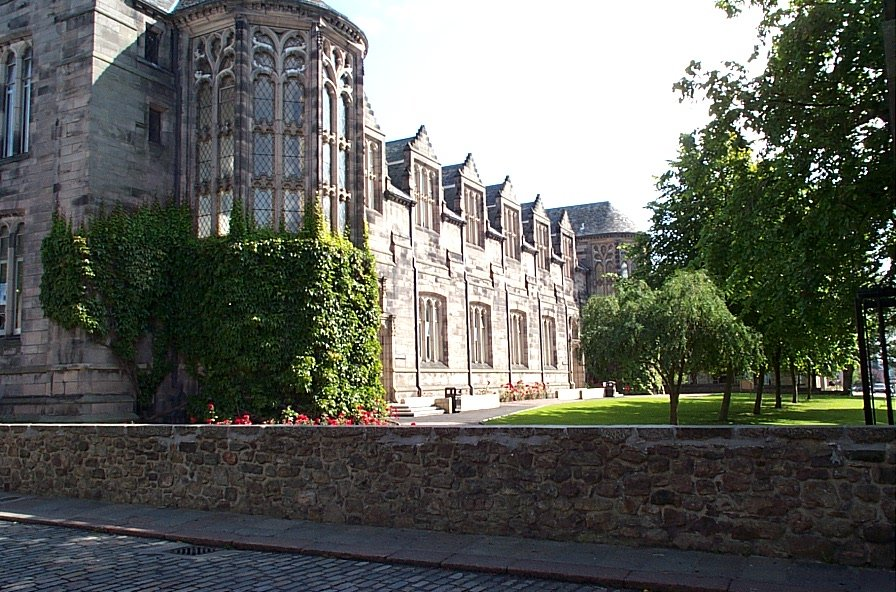
New Building, King's College

The building work on the main buildings of the college began in April 1500 on marshy land, supported by large oak beams. The chapel is topped with an imperial crown, i.e. a closed crown, which appears to make a claim to imperial status for the Scottish monarchy. The original was lost in a storm in 1633, and the present crown is a recreation. King's College chapel retains more medieval woodwork than any other Scottish church, including the choir stalls and screen.

The Cromwell Tower was a building built during the 1650s-60s during the period of the Commonwealth of England, Scotland and Ireland, although finished after Charles II had been reinstalled as King. It was used for accommodation and had an observatory in an ornate turret at its top.

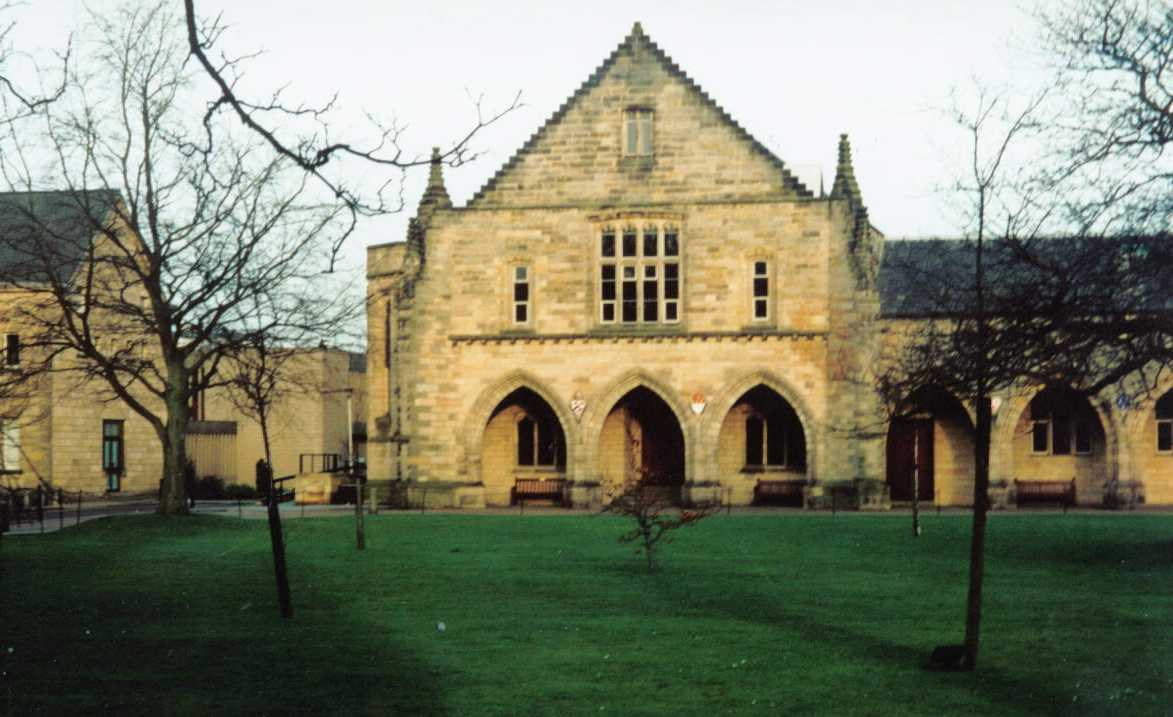
Elphinstone Hall

The 1930 construction of the Elphinstone Hall effectively created a two-quadrangle arrangement, connected to the original King's buildings. The Hall's front faces outwards, with its lawn effectively creating a central open space now bordered on the other sides by Old Aberdeen's High Street and the New Building ("New King's"), constructed in 1913.

King's College is now within the university's main Old Aberdeen campus and retains its original and historic quadrangle which houses a large conference centre and the university's chapel. Elphinstone Hall is used for functions, dining, and examinations. The rear of King's College is now used as a sports pavilion. Notably the old college buildings now provide a focal point to the wider university campus. While small in comparison with some of the newer constructions and areas, the building maintains a great deal of importance.

== King's College Chapel ==
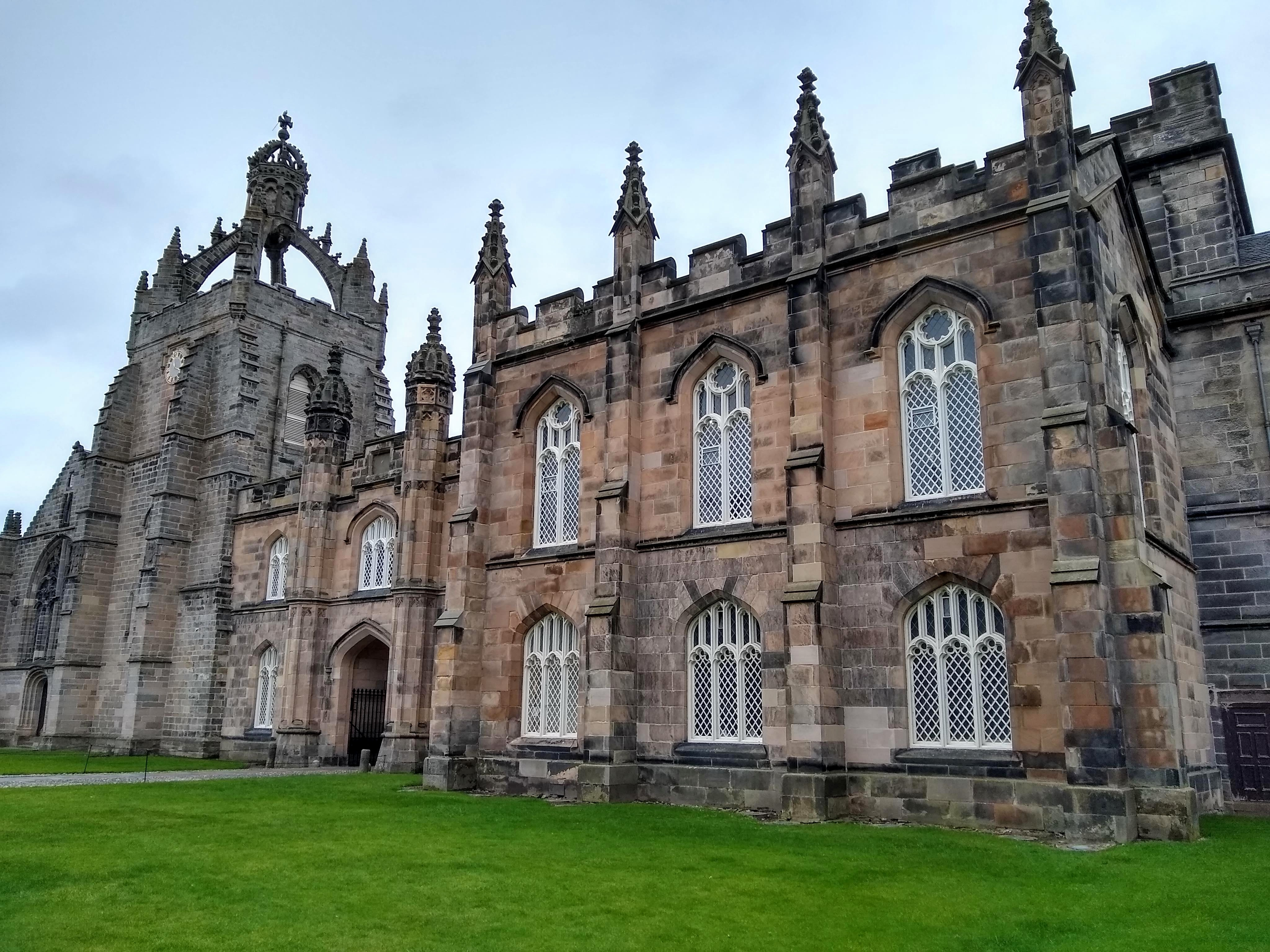
King's College Chapel

King's College Chapel is the main chapel used by the University of Aberdeen. Forming the north side of the original quadrangle of King's College, construction of the chapel began in 1498 and ended with the consecration of the building in 1509. The most notable architectural feature of the Chapel is its Crown Tower, which has become an icon of the university as a whole. The chapel is dedicated to the Trinity and the Blessed Virgin Mary in her Nativity, yet also commemorates a number of Scottish and British monarchs, as well as the patrons and founders of the university. The name particularly recalls the College's main patron, King James IV of Scotland.

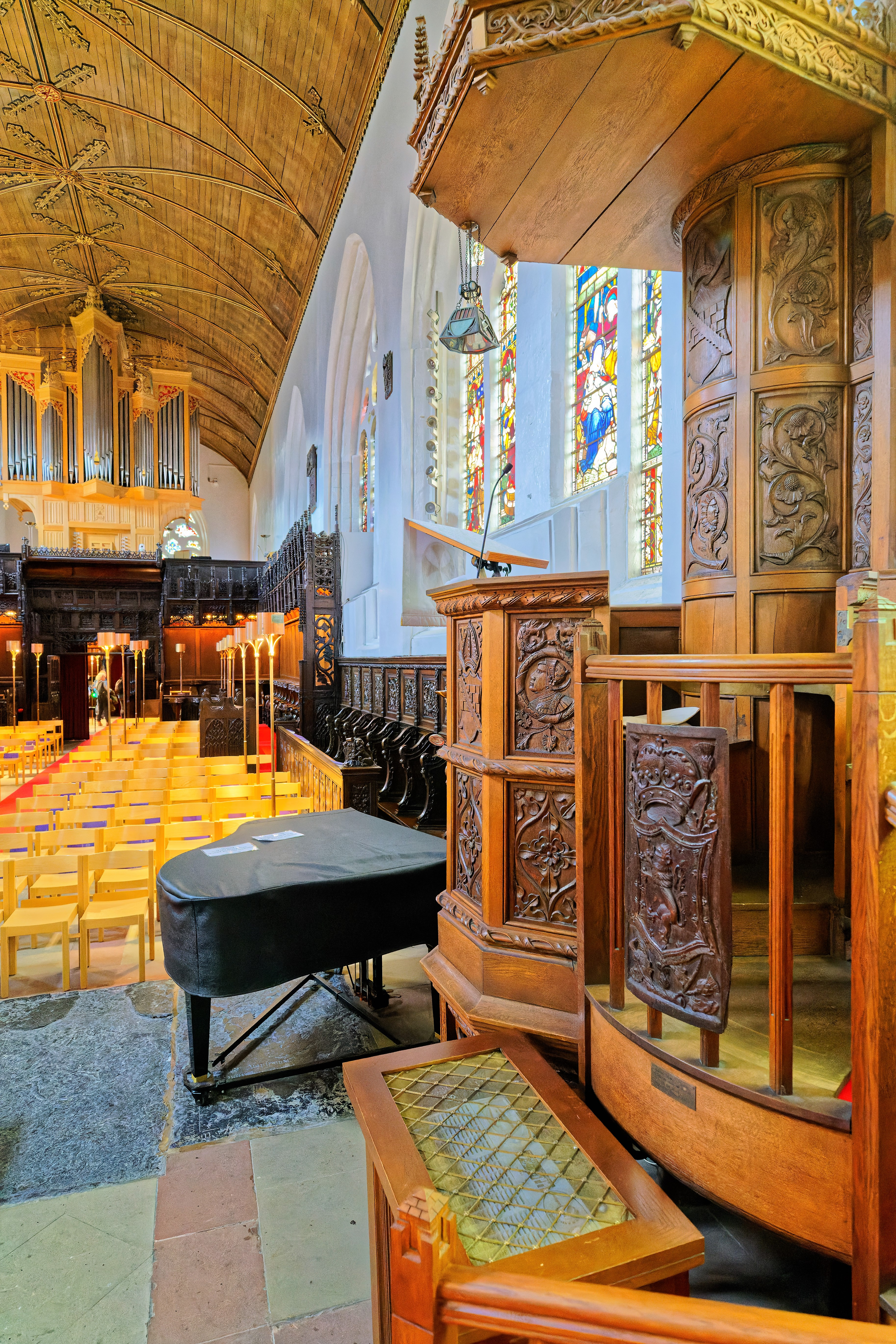
Interior

Particularly notable within the chapel are the choir stalls and rood screen, which date back to around 1509. These form the most complete mediaeval church interior in Scotland. Since 1928, the antechapel has been used as the university's war memorial: five hundred and twenty-four students of the university are commemorated on its walls, having fallen in the First and Second World Wars.

Bishop Elphinstone, the College's founder, and Hector Boece, its first Principal, were buried at the foot of the chancel, although a larger tomb to Elphinstone is located outside the college. However, a later renovation of the chapel found the Bishop's body to be missing, its ultimate fate unknown. The design of the chapel, as well as its date of construction, were designed to evoke Solomon's Temple.

== The King's College Centre ==
The King's College Conference Centre is a conference and events space within the King's College building, established in 1991 within the former university library, yet maintaining many of the original features of the buildings. The conference centre housed the Scottish Parliament between 28 and 30 May 2002 whilst the General Assembly of the Church of Scotland took over its usual annual residence at New College, Edinburgh (the assembly hall of which it had lent the Scottish Parliament during the time of the construction of the new parliament building in Holyrood). During this time, the parliament was addressed by The Queen as part of her Golden Jubilee tour of the United Kingdom.

== Modern campus ==
The university owns much of the land and buildings on the campus, but others are in private ownership as private houses, shops and businesses. Many of these serve the university community. There are also extensive lawns, trees and large displays of flowers. These green spaces are popular places to sit in summer for students and staff.

The original buildings and High Street form the heart of the modern campus and are still used for teaching, to house academic departments, and other university activities. During the 20th century, the university purchased land around these buildings and constructed new ones to enable expansion. These buildings generally reflect the prevailing architecture of their period.

The most recent building is the Science Teaching Hub. Completed in 2021 and first used for teaching in 2022, the building contains laboratories for subjects including biological sciences, chemistry, geosciences and medical sciences.
